= John Banville bibliography =

John Banville (born 8 December 1945) is an Irish novelist, short story writer, adapter of dramas and screenwriter. He has won the Booker Prize, the James Tait Black Memorial Prize, the Franz Kafka Prize, the Austrian State Prize for European Literature and the Prince of Asturias Award for Literature; has been elected a Fellow of the Royal Society of Literature; knighted by Italy; is one of the most acclaimed writers in the English language.

As well as his novels, short stories, plays and non-fiction, Banville has published book reviews and other articles, and written introductions for the neglected short stories of women such as Elizabeth Bowen and Edna O'Brien. A partial bibliography may be found here; it is particularly helpful for locating the original publisher of Banville's books and it also verifies the year of publication of each. However, discrepancies remain between that bibliography and this one on the drama adaptations and original screenplays — for example, that bibliography calls the 1994 screenplay "Seachange", while the IMDb calls a screenplay from the same year by the title "Seascape". The above bibliography does not include Banville's book reviews, nor does it include his articles for various newspapers and magazine publications. A sample of these may be found below.

== Articles ==
=== Book reviews ===
Year	Review article	Work(s) reviewed	Notes
1989	Banville, John (30 March 1989). "International tale". London Review of Books. Vol. 11, no. 7. p. 21.	Bellow, Saul (1989). A theft. Penguin.	
1992	Banville, John (14 May 1992). "Playing House". The New York Review of Books. Vol. 39, no. 9. pp. ?.	Frayn, Michael. A Landing on the Sun. Viking. Wilson, A. N. Daughters of Albion. Viking.	
1992	Banville, John (9 August 1992). "By Lava Possessed". The New York Times. p. ?.	Sontag, Susan (1992). The Volcano Lover. Farrar, Straus and Giroux. ISBN 978-0-374-28516-6.	
1992	Banville, John (13 August 1992). "The Last Word". The New York Review of Books. Vol. 39, no. 14. pp. ?.	Beckett, Samuel. Nohow On: Company, Ill Seen Ill Said, Worstward Ho. Calder.	This elicited an exchange with Everett C. Frost, which appeared in 39 (18).
1993	Banville, John (15 July 1993). "Living in the Shadows". The New York Review of Books. Vol. 40, no. 13. pp. ?.	Klíma, Ivan. Judge on Trial. Translated by A. G. Brain. Knopf.	
1994	Banville, John (9 June 1994). "A Real Funny Guy". The New York Review of Books. Vol. 41, no. 11. pp. ?.	Amis, Kinglsey. The Russian Girl. Viking.	
1994	Banville, John (30 October 1994). "Keeping his gin, not his chin, up". The Guardian or perhaps The Observer?. p. ?.	Hastings, Selina (1994). Evelyn Waugh: A Biography. Sinclair-Stevenson.	
1994	Banville, John (2 November 1994). "War without peace". The New York Review of Books. Vol. 41, no. 18. pp. 4–6.	Aksyonov, Vasily. Generations of winter. Translated by John Glad; Christopher Morris. Random House.	
1996	Banville, John (4 April 1996). "That's Life!". The New York Review of Books. Vol. 43, no. 6. pp. ?.	Swift, Graham. Last Orders. Knopf.	
1996	Banville, John (4 November 1996). "The Painful Comedy of Samuel Beckett". The New York Review of Books. Vol. 43, no. 18. pp. ?.	Knowlson, James. Damned to Fame: The Life of Samuel Beckett. Simon & Schuster. Cronin, Anthony. Samuel Beckett: The Last Modernist. HarperCollins. Gordon, Lois. The World of Samuel Beckett, 1906-1946. Yale University Press. Beckett, Samuel. S. E. Gontarski (ed.). The Complete Short Prose 1929–1989. Grove Press. Beckett, Samuel. Eleutheria. Translated by Michael Brodsky. Foxrock. Beckett, Samuel. Nohow On: Company, Ill Seen Ill Said, Worstward Ho. Grove Press.	
1997	Banville, John (20 February 1997). "Revelations". The New York Review of Books. Vol. 44, no. 3. pp. ?.	Munro, Alice. Selected Stories. Knopf. Trevor, William. After Rain. Viking.	Commentary on the short story as a literary form
1997	Banville, John (12 June 1997). "The European Irishman". The New York Review of Books. Vol. 44, no. 10. pp. ?.	Butler, Hubert. Independent Spirit. Farrar, Straus and Giroux.	
1999	Banville, John (14 January 1999). "The Dawn of the Gods". The New York Review of Books. Vol. 46, no. 1. pp. ?.	Calasso, Roberto. Ka: Stories of the Mind and Gods of India. Translated by Tim Parks. Knopf.	
1999	Banville, John (18 February 1999). "All Antennae". London Review of Books. Vol. 21, no. 4. pp. 19–20.	Cesarani, David (November 1998). Arthur Koestler: The Homeless Mind. Heinemann. ISBN 0-434-11305-0.	
1999	Banville, John (24 June 1999). "The Friend of Promise". The New York Review of Books. Vol. 46, no. 11. pp. ?.	Lewis, Jeremy (1997). Cyril Connolly: A Life. Jonathan Cape. ISBN 0-224-03710-2.	
2000	Banville, John (20 January 2000). "Endgame". The New York Review of Books. Vol. 47, no. 1. pp. ?.	Coetzee, J. M. Disgrace. Viking.	
2000	Banville, John (27 April 2000). "Landscape Artist". The New York Review of Books. Vol. 47, no. 7. pp. ?.	Magris, Claudio. Microcosms. Translated by Iain Halliday. Harvill.	
2001	Banville, John (4 August 2001). "Summon the Gods". The Irish Times. p. ?.	Calasso, Roberto (2001). Literature and the Gods. Translated by Tim Parks. Knopf.	A book based on the previous year's Weidenfeld Lectures delivered at Oxford
2003	Banville, John (10 April 2003). "By George". The New York Review of Books. Vol. 50, no. 6. pp. ?.	Saddlemyer, Ann. Becoming George: The Life of Mrs. W. B. Yeats. Oxford University Press.	
2004	Banville, John (1 May 2004). "Light but sound". The Guardian. p. ?.	Kundera, Milan (1984). The Unbearable Lightness of Being. Faber and Faber.	On the twentieth anniversary of its publication
2004	Banville, John (2 December 2004). "The Missing Link". The New York Review of Books. Vol. 51, no. 19. pp. ?.	Higgins, Aidan. Langrishe, Go Down. Dalkey Archive. Higgins, Aidan. A Bestiary. Dalkey Archive. Higgins, Aidan. Flotsam & Jetsam. Dalkey Archive.	On the occasion of the American publication of Langrishe, Go Down
2005	Banville, John (26 May 2005). "A Day in the Life". The New York Review of Books. Vol. 52, no. 9. pp. ?.	McEwan, Ian. Saturday. Nan A. Talese/Doubleday.	This elicited an exchange with McEwan defender John Sutherland, which appeared in 52 (11), and featured Banville's immortal line: "Summoned, one shuffles guiltily into the Department of Trivia".
2006	Banville, John (23 February 2006). "Homage to Philip Larkin". The New York Review of Books. Vol. 53, no. 3. pp. ?.	Larkin, Philip. Anthony Thwaite (ed.). Collected Poems (2003). Farrar, Straus and Giroux. Bradford, Richard (2005). First Boredom, Then Fear: The Life of Philip Larkin. Peter Owen/Dufour Editions. ISBN 0-7206-1147-4. Larkin, Philip. Anthony Thwaite (ed.). Collected Poems (1988). Farrar, Straus and Giroux. Motion, Andrew (1994). Philip Larkin: A Writer's Life. Faber. ISBN 0-571-17065-X. Larkin, Philip. Required Writing: Miscellaneous Pieces, 1955–1982. Faber. Larkin, Philip (1993). Anthony Thwaite (ed.). Selected Letters of Philip Larkin, 1940–1985. Faber. ISBN 0-571-17048-X.	
2006	Banville, John (25 March 2006). "Beckett on the couch". The Guardian. p. ?.	Knowlson, James; Knowlson, Elizabeth, eds. (2006). Beckett Remembering, Remembering Beckett. Bloomsbury.	
2006	Banville, John (29 April 2006). "Grave thoughts from a master". The Guardian. p. ?.	Roth, Philip (2006). Everyman. Jonathan Cape. ISBN 978-0-618-73516-7.	
2006	Banville, John (21 December 2006). "Letters from the Heights". The New York Review of Books. Vol. 53, no. 20. pp. ?.	Rilke, Rainer Maria; Salomé, Lou Andreas-. Rainer Maria Rilke and Lou Andreas-Salomé: The Correspondence. Translated by Edward Snow; Michael Winkler. Norton.	This elicited an exchange on translating Rilke with Richard Stern and John Friedmann, which appeared in 54 (5).
2007	Banville, John (28 June 2007). "The Family Pinfold". The New York Review of Books. Vol. 54, no. 11. pp. 20–21.	Waugh, Alexander. Fathers and Sons: The Autobiography of a Family. Nan A. Talese/Doubleday.	
2007	Banville, John (4 October 2007). "Z/R". London Review of Books. Vol. 29, no. 19. pp. 23–24.	Roth, Philip (October 2007). Exit Ghost. Jonathan Cape. ISBN 978-0-224-08173-3.	
2009	Banville, John (3 December 2009). "Emerson: 'A Few Inches from Calamity'". The New York Review of Books. Vol. 56, no. 19. pp. ?.	Richardson, Robert D. (2009). First We Read, Then We Write: Emerson on the Creative Process. University of Iowa Press. ISBN 978-1-58729-793-9.	
2010	Banville, John (8 April 2010). "Against the North Wall". The New York Review of Books. Vol. 57, no. 6. pp. ?.	DeLillo, Don. Point Omega. Scribner.	
2010	Banville, John (20 November 2010). "Saul Bellow: Letters - review". The Guardian. p. ?.		
2011	Banville, John (29 July 2011). "Orpheus: The Song of Life by Ann Wroe – review". The Guardian. p. ?.	Wroe, Ann (2011). Orpheus: The Song of Life. Jonathan Cape.	
2011	Banville, John (27 October 2011). "The Most Entertaining Philosopher". The New York Review of Books. Vol. 58, no. 16. pp. ?.	Robert D. Richardson (ed.). The Heart of William James. Harvard University Press.	
2011	Banville, John (28 October 2011). "A collection of short stories reveals Don DeLillo as a writer who arrived fully formed". Financial Times. pp. ?.	DeLillo, Don (2011). The Angel Esmeralda: Nine Stories. Scribner.	
2012	Banville, John (25 January 2012). "The Complete Poems by Philip Larkin, edited by Archie Burnett - review". The Guardian. p. ?.	Larkin, Philip (January 2012). Burnett, Archie (ed.). The Complete Poems by Philip Larkin. Faber. ISBN 978-0-571-24006-7.	
2012	Banville, John (22 March 2012). "Beckett: Storming for Beauty". The New York Review of Books. Vol. 59, no. 5. pp. ?.	George Craig; Martha Dow Fehsenfeld; Dan Gunn; Lois More Overbeck (eds.). The Letters of Samuel Beckett, Volume II: 1941–1956. Cambridge University Press.	
2012	Banville, John (21 June 2012). "Bizarre & Wonderful Strindberg". The New York Review of Books. Vol. 59, no. 11. pp. ?.	Prideaux, Sue. Strindberg: A Life. Yale University Press.	
2012	Banville, John (25 October 2012). "Rebel, Hero, Martyr". The New York Review of Books. Vol. 59, no. 16. pp. ?.	Vargas Llosa, Mario. The Dream of the Celt. Translated by Edith Grossman. Farrar, Straus and Giroux.	
2013	Banville, John (10 January 2013). "Study the Panther!". The New York Review of Books. Vol. 60, no. 1. pp. ?.	Rilke, Rainer Maria. Letters to a Young Poet. Translated by Mark Harman. Harvard University Press.	
2013	Banville, John (24 October 2013). "A Different Kafka". The New York Review of Books. Vol. 60, no. 16. pp. ?.	Stach, Reiner. Kafka: The Decisive Years. Translated by Shelley Frisch. Princeton University Press. Stach, Reiner. Kafka: The Years of Insight. Translated by Shelley Frisch. Princeton University Press. Friedländer, Saul. Franz Kafka: The Poet of Shame and Guilt. Yale University Press.	
2017	Banville, John (9 February 2012). "The Strange Genius of the Master". The New York Review of Books. Vol. 64, no. 2. pp. ?.	Eade, Philip. Evelyn Waugh: A Life Revisited. Henry Holt.	
2017	Banville, John (March 2017). "The Master by the Arno". Literary Review. No. 451. pp. ?.	James, Henry (1880–81). The Portrait of a Lady.	
2017	Banville, John (17 August 2017). "Ending at the Beginning". The New York Review of Books. Vol. 64, no. 13. pp. ?.	Stach, Reiner. Kafka: The Early Years. Translated by Shelley Frisch. Princeton University Press.	
2018	Banville, John (8 March 2018). "The Impossibility of Being Oscar". The New York Review of Books. Vol. 65, no. 4. pp. ?.	Frankel, Nicholas. Oscar Wilde: The Unrepentant Years. Harvard University Press.	
2019	Banville, John (March 7–20, 2019). "What made the Old Boys turn?". The New York Review of Books. 66 (4): 35–37.	Davenport-Hines, Richard. Enemies within: Communists, the Cambridge Spies and the making of modern Britain. HarperCollins.; Philipps, Roland. A spy named Orphan: the enigma of Donald Maclean. Norton.	
2019	Banville, John (26 September 2019). "Of Terrorists, Tourists, and Robert Frost". The New York Review of Books. Vol. 66, no. 14. pp. ?.	Roberto, Calasso (2019). The Unnamable Present. Translated by Richard Dixon. Farrar, Straus and Giroux.	

=== Other ===
Year	Review article	Subject	Notes
2015	Banville, John (7 March 2015). "In praise of Elizabeth Bowen: Celebrating Irish women writers". The Irish Times.	Elizabeth Bowen	—N/a
2016	Banville, John (15 October 2016). "John Banville's Dublin, a city lost – and found". The Guardian.	Memories; Dublin	—N/a
2019	Banville, John (24 October 2019). "A Master of Hidden Things". The New York Review of Books. Vol. 66, no. 16. pp. ?.	Elizabeth Bowen	—N/a

== Books ==
=== Novels ===
- Nightspawn. London: Secker & Warburg, 1971. ISBN 978-1852355593
- Birchwood. London: Secker & Warburg, 1973. ISBN 0-307-27912-X
- Revolutions Trilogy :

- Doctor Copernicus. London: Secker & Warburg, 1976. ISBN 0-679-73799-5
- Kepler. London: Secker & Warburg, 1981. ISBN 0-679-74370-7
- The Newton Letter. London: Secker & Warburg, 1982. ISBN 1-567-92096-9

- Mefisto. London: Secker & Warburg, 1986. ISBN 1-567-92847-1
- Frames Trilogy

- The Book of Evidence. London: Secker & Warburg, 1989. ISBN 0-436-03267-8
- Ghosts. London: Secker & Warburg, 1993. ISBN 0-436-19991-2
- Athena. London: Secker & Warburg, 1995. ISBN 2-221-09269-4

- The Untouchable. London: Picador, 1997. ISBN 0-679-76747-9
- Alexander and Cass Cleave Trilogy

- Eclipse. London: Picador, 2000. ISBN 0-330-33933-8
- Shroud. London: Picador, 2002. ISBN 978-0-330-48315-5
- Ancient Light. London: Viking Penguin, 2012. ISBN 978-0-670-92061-7

- The Sea. London: Picador, 2005. ISBN 0-330-48328-5
- The Infinities. London: Picador, 2009. ISBN 978-0330450249
- The Blue Guitar. London: Viking Penguin, 2015. ISBN 978-0241970010
- Mrs Osmond. London: Penguin, 2017. ISBN 978-0241260173
- The Singularities. London: Knopf, 2022. ISBN 978-0525655176

=== Short stories ===
- Long Lankin. London: Secker & Warburg, 1970; revised edition 1984.

=== For children ===
- The Ark. Oldcastle: Gallery, 1996 (Note: The Gallery Press published only 260 copies of this book for children, with illustrations by Conor Fallon, in support of The Ark Cultural Centre for Children. As a result, used copies of The Ark can retail online at great expense; for example Number 52, signed by Banville and Fallon, became available for £500.)

=== Non-fiction ===
- Prague Pictures: Portrait of a City. London: Bloomsbury, 2003
- Time Pieces: A Dublin Memoir. Dublin: Hachette Books, 2016

=== Pseudonymous works ===
- Quirke series
1. Christine Falls. London: Picador, 2006. Published as Benjamin Black. ISBN 978-0330445320
2. The Silver Swan. London: Picador, 2007. Published as Benjamin Black. ISBN 978-0805081534
3. Elegy for April. London: Mantle, 2010. Published as Benjamin Black. ISBN 978-1447263999
4. A Death in Summer. London: Mantle, 2011. Published as Benjamin Black. ISBN 978-0805090925
5. Vengeance. London: Mantle, 2012. Published as Benjamin Black. ISBN 978-1250024183
6. Holy Orders. London: Mantle, 2013. Published as Benjamin Black. ISBN 978-0805094404
7. Even the Dead. London: Viking, 2015. Published as Benjamin Black. ISBN 978-0241197356
8. April in Spain. London: Faber & Faber, 2021. Strafford & Quirke . Published as John Banville. ISBN 978-1335471406
9. The Lock-up. London: Faber & Faber, 2023. Strafford & Quirke . Published as John Banville. ISBN 978-0571370979
10. The Drowned. London: Faber & Faber, 2024. Toronto, Ontario, Canada: Hanover Square Press, 2024. Strafford & Quirke . Published as John Banville. ISBN 978-0571370832
- St John Strafford series
1. Snow. London: Faber & Faber, 2020. Published as John Banville. ISBN 978-1335230003
2. The Secret Guests. London: Penguin, 2020. Published as B. W. Black. ISBN 978-0241305317
- Other titles published as by Benjamin Black, or written for a similar readership:

- The Lemur. London: Picador, 2008 (previously serialised in The New York Times). Published as Benjamin Black. ISBN 978-0571399673
- The Black-Eyed Blonde. New York: Henry Holt, 2014 (a Philip Marlowe novel). Published as Benjamin Black. ISBN 978-0805098143
- Prague Nights. London: Penguin, 2017 (published in the U.S. as Wolf on a String). Published as Benjamin Black. ISBN 978-0241197387
- Venetian Vespers. Knopf. October 2025. Published as John Banville. ISBN 978-0593801161

== Plays ==
- The Broken Jug. Oldcastle: Gallery, 1995 (after Heinrich von Kleist's play of that name)
- Seachange. Unpublished (performed 1994 in the Focus Theatre, Dublin)
- Dublin 1742. Unpublished (performed 2002 in The Ark, Dublin; a play for those between the ages of nine and fourteen)
- God's Gift: A Version of Amphitryon by Heinrich von Kleist. Oldcastle: Gallery, 2000
- Love in the Wars. Oldcastle: Gallery, 2005 (adaptation of Heinrich von Kleist's Penthesilea)
- Todtnauberg. Radio play aired by the BBC in January 2006; later reissued as Conversation in the Mountains in 2008. about the conversations between Paul Celan and Martin Heidegger (and his relationship with Hannah Arendt) at Todtnauberg in the Black Forest in Germany.

== Screenwriting ==
- 1983 or 1984?: Reflections (adaptation of The Newton Letter for Court House Films/Channel Four 1983. 90 mins)
- 1994: Seascape
- 1999: The Last September (adaptation of the Elizabeth Bowen novel for Trimark Pictures)
- 2011: Albert Nobbs
- 2013: The Sea

== Introductions ==
Year	Book	Notes
2009	Stark, Richard (pseud. of Donald E. Westlake) (2009). The Score. University of Chicago Press. pp. i–x.	"The Parker Novels"
2009	Stark, Richard (pseud. of Donald E. Westlake) (2009). The Jugger. University of Chicago Press. pp. i–x.	"The Parker Novels"
2010	Stark, Richard (pseud. of Donald E. Westlake) (2010). The Mourner. University of Chicago Press. pp. i–x.	"The Parker Novels"
2013	O'Brien, Edna (2013). The Love Object: Selected Stories. Faber. pp. ix–xii.	—N/a
2019	Bowen, Elizabeth (2019). Collected Stories. Everyman.	"In his introduction to this new collected edition of her stories, John Banville argues that Elizabeth Bowen, best remembered for her novels such as The Last September, was 'the supreme genius of her time' in the short form".

== Other ==
Year	Book	Subject	Notes
April 2012	Fighting Words	His time working the night-shift on a newspaper	A hand-printed book of short stories, limited to 150 copies and featuring contributions from various writers
2014	McLean, Janet, ed. (14 October 2014). Lines of Vision: Irish Writers on Art. Thames & Hudson.	Caravaggio's 1602 painting The Taking of Christ	A book released to mark the 150th anniversary of the National Gallery of Ireland, featuring contributions from various writers
