= The Supreme Fictions of John Banville =

1999 literary criticism book by Joseph McMinn

- Author: Joseph McMinn
- Genre: Literary criticism
- Publisher: Manchester University Press
- Publication date: 1999
- Media type: Print
- Pages: x + 190
- ISBN: 0-7190-5397-8

The Supreme Fictions of John Banville is a 1999 book by Joseph McMinn, which follows on from his 1991 book John Banville: A Critical Study, and deals with the work of major turn of the century writer John Banville.

The material on Banville's works as far as the mid-1980s is much the same as in McMinn's earlier book, though with slight revisions.

The book treats for the first time Banville's novels of the 1990s and, to this effect, the chapter from the 1991 McMinn text on The Book of Evidence is revised and expanded, to precede new chapters on Banville's Ghosts, Athena and (in the form of a longer chapter) The Untouchable.

McMinn, according to John Kenny in The Irish Times, "has carefully rethought his original text stylistically and structurally, to the extent that certain paragraphs are reformed and some phrases and even single words are changed". Kenny regarded the book as suitable both for the academic and the general reader and reserved special praise for McMinn's "completely rewritten" introductory section, claiming that "these first few pages constitute, now, the single best summation of the Banville œuvre". The Guardian described The Supreme Fictions of John Banville as "a commentary on Banville's fiction in the context of contemporary critical theory".
