= John Banville: A Critical Study =

1991 book by Joseph McMinn

- Author: Joseph McMinn
- Series: Gill's Studies in Irish Literature
- Genre: Literary criticism
- Publisher: Gill & Macmillan
- Publication date: 1991
- Media type: Print
- Pages: 138
- ISBN: 0-7171-1803-7

John Banville: A Critical Study is a 1991 book by Joseph McMinn, which deals with the work of major turn of the century writer John Banville. It is part of Gill's Studies in Irish Literature series. McMinn claims to take a different approach to the "formalist" Rüdiger Imhof, who had until that time been the only other writer to treat of Banville's fiction (in his 1989 book John Banville: A Critical Introduction).

As the book was published in 1991, it deals only with Banville's works as far as the late-1980s. Almost two thirds of the book focus on the novels Doctor Copernicus, Kepler, The Newton Letter and Mefisto, while the remaining third focus on the short stories, the two early novels and the recently published work The Book of Evidence. Gerry Dukes, reviewing McMinn's book for Studies: An Irish Quarterly Review, described it as "not particularly distinguished... in that, while it promises much, it contrives to deliver very little of critical substance", though praised its accounts of Kepler and Doctor Copernicus as "sufficiently informative and elegant to induce regret that the others are mere dim sightings".

In The Supreme Fictions of John Banville, published in 1999, McMinn expanded upon this text to include Banville's works from the 1990s.
