= The Singularities =

2022 novel by John Banville

- First edition cover
- Author: John Banville
- Language: English
- Publisher: Alfred A. Knopf
- Publication date: October 25, 2022
- Media type: Print (hardcover, paperback)
- Pages: 320
- ISBN: 9780525655176

The Singularities is a novel by the Irish author John Banville, published in 2022 by Alfred A. Knopf. It is based on characters and themes from the author's earlier novels. Felix Mordaunt, sentenced to life for murder, has been released from prison. He goes to visit his childhood home, which is now occupied by Adam and Helen Godley, a middle aged couple. Adam's late father, Adam senior, was a famous academic. He is the author of the "Brahma theory", a hypothesis of space, time and multiple universes. Adam engages William Jaybey, an academic author, to write a biography of his father; Jaybey accepts the commission though he has little regard for Professor Godley's work.

== Plot summary ==
Felix Mordaunt has been released from prison on licence after serving 20 years for the murder of a young woman. He has changed his name from Freddie Montgomery, the villain of The Book of Evidence. He decides to visit his childhood home, a country house called Coolgrange. He committed the murder in the neighbouring house of Whitewater in the course of stealing a painting.

Coolgrange is now known as Arden House, and is occupied by a middle aged couple, Adam and Helen Godley. Adam's late father, also called Adam, was a distinguished academic. Prof. Godley was the deviser of the Brahma theory, a mathematical concept of space and time which predicted multiple universes. He published his theories in a paper entitled "On singularities and the fissuring of worldlines". The Godley family are central to Banville's earlier novel The Infinities.

Mordaunt calls at Arden House and tells Helen that he was born there. She is happy to receive him, and arranges for him to lodge in the cottage of her housekeeper, Ivy Blount. The novel continues with reminiscences by Ursula, the widow of Prof. Godley. She is visited by the spirit of Petra, her daughter who committed suicide.

The story now introduces William Jaybey (who first appeared in The Newton Letter). Jaybey is an academic who knew Prof. Godley at the fictional University of Arcady in California. Adam Godley junior has asked Jaybey to write his father's biography, and Jaybey is now installed in Arden House where he has access to the great man's papers. Jaybey however is sceptical of Godley's work. While exploring Arden House Jaybey comes across Ursula, who is still living there as a recluse.

Helen disliked her father-in-law who she describes as a lecher: she says he had a fling with a girl a quarter of his age, who eventually killed herself. Jaybey is infatuated with Helen; however he is dismayed to find out that Helen has had a sexual encounter with Mordaunt.

Mordaunt is visited by Anna Behrens (a character from The Book of Evidence), an old flame who lives in the nearby Whitewater House. She kept in touch with him while he was in prison. Anna makes the surprising request that she would like Mordaunt to kill her. Mordaunt finally decides to depart alone, taking some of the Godley papers which he intends to publish himself.

== Style ==
The Singularities is not a straightforward novel in which the plot unfolds in a logical order. Eoghan Smith says it as "a work that meditates in highly sophisticated ways on the nature of reality, existence, knowledge, art, love and death". Alex Clark describes it as "a wild masked ball rife with gossip about the books that have preceded it ... a playful interrogation of the peculiar and suggestive world he has been busily creating for the past half century." Tom Ball says that "there is more than a touch of surrealism".

Much of the time the style has a light touch: "a welcome sense of playfulness ... he is clearly having fun"; "He is also at his most mischievous". John Self says that it "is lively on the surface, but there's a current of sadness running beneath".

This novel has the mastery of expression described of his previous works (see "Style" in the main entry for Banville). John Self talks of "the usual sumptuous style ... a brilliant grasp of imagery". Troy Jollimore says "Such is the beauty of Banville's prose that every page of The Singularities is a perplexing and enigmatic delight". Allan Massie says he reads Banville "most of all for his uncanny ability to render mood and atmosphere into verbal pictures".

== Major themes ==
A major theme is memories and the past. Alex Clark observed: "Banville, as ever, is concerned with ghosts: traces left behind, lives we might have led". Characters from previous novels "pop up in the background or in memory. These characters haunt themselves, are in flight from crimes of the past.". "All his players find in the past an alternative world they can't help dwelling on".

Another main theme is the illusion of reality and the distortion of the truth. Troy Jollimore wrote: "There is a great deal of unreliable reportage and speculation." He asks whether the things that happen in the story are real or metaphorical, and talks of "a chaotic universe where nothing ... is necessarily fixed or secure". Leo Robson says "Banville has found a form that mobilizes his most cherished theme – the slipperiness of reality. A world that is at once unrecognisable but familiar". A subset of this theme is what Jon Day calls "scholarly skulduggery", i.e. cheating in the academic world: Jaybey regards both Prof. Godley and Prof. Axel Vander (the subjects of his biographies) as frauds.

At times the novel moves into an altered historical reality. The Dutch have taken New York and renamed it New Amsterdam, and cars run on seawater through cold fusion. "Banville has fun with this" says Alex Clark.

== Reception ==
Critics largely praised the novel. In a review for The Scotsman, Allan Massie lauded the writing, noting Banville's "jewelled sentences". Tom Ball of The Times described the book as "This beautifully written almost-whodunnit". Reviewers also praised Banville's insight into the human condition through the experiences of his characters: "Banville in following them (his characters) through these dizzyingly reflective moods and milieux, has constructed a compelling underworld to run alongside our own." Allan Massie described delight "in the perceptive flashes of understanding and misunderstanding, in the clarity of perception. He works very close to the experience of life beyond or behind the words".

Some critics perceived a lack of coherence to the story and a dependence on recycled characters. Jon Day observed: "Plot has felt increasingly like a tiresome obligation he must perform in the service of his unspooling words. The various storylines set up in The Singularities ... scarcely seem to matter. Instead they're the scaffolding from which the author can hang his sentences, which are alternately lush and dangerously overfertilised." Writing for The Daily Telegraph, John Self noted: "The book is so steeped in his past work that the ideal reader is probably the author."

Critiques of the book included John Self's view that "[Banville] is clearly having fun – but are we?". Jon Day echoed a similar sentiment: "It's clear that Banville is having a great deal of fun with all of this. What's less obvious is whether we are." Leo Robson concluded that "For all its virtuosity, The Singularities doesn't qualify as Banville's masterpiece or summa." Tom Ball felt that "After a while you can't help but wonder whether you ... might be the begrudged guest of someone who would rather be left to their own devices."
