= Mary Morrissy =

Irish novelist and short story writer (born 1957)

- Born: 25 January 1957 (age 69); Dublin, Ireland
- Education: Technological University Dublin
- Occupations: Novelist; short story writer

Mary Morrissy (born 25 January 1957) is an Irish novelist and short story writer. She writes on art, fiction, and history. Morrissy is an elected member of Aosdána, Ireland's academy of artists and writers.

== Life ==
Morrissy was born in Dublin. A graduate of Rathmines College and Technological University Dublin, she has taught creative writing in Ireland and the United States of America, notably in University College Dublin, Trinity College Dublin, University of Iowa, and University College Cork. Morrissy trained as a journalist and has worked as a reporter/feature writer/sub-editor on three of Ireland's national dailies. She is also a critic who has reviewed fiction for The Irish Times, The Sunday Business Post, and The Dublin Review of Books.

On the publication of her first collection of short stories, A Lazy Eye, (1993) Candice Rodd wrote in The Independent: "Morrissy is no glib psychoanalyst; more a cool but gifted pathologist under whose microscope tiny slivers of unremarkable human tissue are shown to be teeming with microbial life and mysterious, mutant energy." The New York Times described this collection as an "elegantly written and grimly perceptive collection of stories".

Morrissy was a fellow at the New York Public Library in 2005–6, where she researched the life of Sean O'Casey's Sister, Bella, which was subsequently published as The Rising of Bella Casey in 2013. Alfred Hickling reviewed the novel in The Guardian: "Morrissy reconstructs Bella's story with a telling eye for incongruous detail. An upright piano abandoned in the street during the Easter rising opens a portal to more affluent times; while her fortitude against poverty and the influence of feckless and abusive men sets a template for the heroines of her younger brother's plays: 'Characters already born and ready-made, roaming their foetid rooms in search of a writer'."

In 2008–9 Morrissy held the post of the Jenny McKean Moore Writer-in-Residence at George Washington University.

In 2015, Morrissy was appointed as lecturer in Creative Writing at University College Cork.

Morrissy published "an exploded novel"—a linked collection of short stories—in 2016. Reviewing the book in The Guardian, Claire Kilroy wrote: "Prosperity Drive is a book about sex and death. The protagonists – that 'roll call of the damaged and the lost' – encounter both but are unable to handle either. The compassion, immediacy, humour and delicacy with which Morrissy depicts their predicaments result in moments of profundity."

Morrissy published Penelope Unbound in 2023, a novel which imagined a different outcome to the life of James Joyce and his wife Nora Barnacle after their arrival in Trieste in 1904. Reviewing the book in The Guardian, John Banville wrote: "The result is a novel of great brilliance and inventiveness, a remarkably – and mysteriously – moving story of what might have been. It is a stylistic tour de force that Joyce himself would surely have admired: Nora’s voice is earthy, funny, by turns knockabout and melancholy, plain and lyrical, accepting and bitterly regretful."

Morrissy currently works as a writing coach, offering one-to-one creative mentoring, editing and appraisal services to writers.

== Awards ==
- 1984: Hennessy Literary Award
- 1995: Lannan Foundation Prize
- 2015: Elected a member of Aosdána

== Works ==
=== Novels ===
- Mother of Pearl, Jonathan Cape/Vintage/Scribner, 1996, ISBN 0-09-958251-1
- The Pretender, Jonathan Cape/Vintage, 2000, ISBN 0-09-928367-0
- The Rising of Bella Casey, Brandon, 2013, ISBN 978-1847175762
- Penelope Unbound, Banshee Press, 2023, ISBN 978-1838312688

=== Short stories ===
- A Lazy Eye, Jonathan Cape/Vintage/Scribner, 1993, ISBN 0-09-970141-3
- Prosperity Drive, Jonathan Cape, 2016, ISBN 978-0224102193
- Twenty-Twenty Vision, The Lilliput Press Ltd., 2025, ISBN 978-1843519164

=== Contributions ===
- New Irish Short Stories, ed. Joseph O'Connor, Faber & Faber, 2011, ISBN 0-571-25527-2
- Imagination in the Classroom: Teaching and Learning Creative Writing in Ireland, ed. Anne Fogarty, Four Courts, 2013, ISBN 978-1846824135
- Dubliners 100, ed. Thomas Morris, Tramp, 2014, ISBN 978-0992817015
- Surge, New Writing from Ireland, O'Brien, 2014, ISBN 978-1847176936
- All Over Ireland, ed. Deirdre Madden, Faber & Faber, 2015, ISBN 978-0571311033
- The Vibrant House: Irish Writing and Domestic Space, ed. Lucy McDiarmid, Four Courts, 2017, ISBN 978-1846826481
- The Danger and the Glory: Irish Authors on the Art of Writing, ed. Hedwig Schwall, Arlen House, 2019, ISBN 978-1851322060
- The Music of What Happens, ed. Tanya Ferrelly, New Island Books, 2020, ISBN 978-1848407763
- The Art of the Glimpse, ed. Sinéad Gleeson, Head of Zeus, 2020, ISBN 978-1788548809
