= Claire Kilroy =

Irish writer

Claire Kilroy (born 1973) is a contemporary Irish author. She was born, and currently resides, in Dublin, Ireland.

== Background ==
=== Early life ===
Born in Dublin in 1973, Claire Kilroy grew up in the scenic fishing village of Howth, north of the city, and was educated in the local primary school. Howth is central to two of her novels and she describes its beauty and character as fundamental to the person she became. Kilroy does not remember a time when she did not want to be an author. Her first story, written at age 7 or 8, was a ghost story centred on a child who one night decides to break into a haunted house. Once inside, the child is chased by figures wearing chains and white sheets. Kilroy gave the story to her mother who laughed hysterically; Kilroy later learned she had misspelt sheet, replacing "ee" with the letter "i", resulting in her mother's reaction.

=== Education ===
Kilroy attended Trinity College, Dublin, studying English, as an undergraduate. She went on to work as an assistant editor on the BBC television drama Ballykissangel, while writing the first draft of her novel All Summer. In 2000, she decided to return to Trinity College and earned her M. Phil. in Creative Writing. This choice ultimately led to her publishing deal with Faber & Faber.

=== Influences ===
Two authors Kilroy cites as influential to her work are John Banville and Vladimir Nabokov. After reading Lolita at age 16, she was inspired to write sentences as vividly as Nabokov. She counts Martin Amis, Andrew O'Hagan, and Michael Frayn among some of her favourite authors, while her favourite Irish novel is John Banville's Athena.

== Novels ==
=== All Summer ===
Kilroy's debut novel, All Summer, was published in May 2003 by Faber & Faber. In 2004, the novel won the Rooney Prize for Irish Literature. At the opening of the novel, the main character Anna Hunt has lost her memory. On the run from an unknown pursuer, all she knows is that she is connected to a stolen painting that is being restored in the National Gallery. A review from the Irish Independent states: "It's no accident that the stolen painting in the story is Girl in the Mirror, underlining the novel's exploration of outward appearance and inner identity. The novel, like a cracked mirror, reflects twisted, inverted and doubled images of the main characters, especially those involved in the crime."

=== Tenderwire ===
In 2006, Kilroy published her second novel, titled Tenderwire, again with Faber & Faber. The novel was shortlisted for the 2007 Hughes & Hughes Irish Novel of the Year Award as well as the Kerry Group Irish Fiction Award. The novel's protagonist, Eva, is a professional violinist who becomes obsessed with a violin of dubious origins. Although she manages to purchase it, as the novel goes on she becomes increasingly paranoid about the instrument and the people around her. Critically acclaimed, Kirkus Reviews claims, "The novel's flaws do not compromise its striking beauty."

=== All Names Have Been Changed ===
Kilroy published her third novel, All Names Have Been Changed in 2009. This book was the last of a series that loosely meditated on the arts – Painting, Music and Writing. The novel is set during the 1980s at Trinity College in Dublin, Kilroy's alma mater. It centres on five creative writing students and the turbulent relationships they have with their famous tutor. A review from The Independent stated: "This impressive novel shows Kilroy perfectly at home in the literary firmament that she describes". Unlike Kilroy's two previous novels, All Names Have Been Changed is narrated from a male perspective, a difference critics are quick to point out. When asked about the decision, she says that while uncomfortable, it was freeing once she developed the narrator's voice.

=== The Devil I Know ===
Kilroy's fourth novel, The Devil I Know (Faber & Faber, 2012) begins during a testimony told by the narrator, Tristram, at a tribunal in 2016 investigating the Celtic Tiger's dealings. It then jumps back in time as Tristram tells his story. In a review, Stevie Davies of The Guardian comments that while it does not show the effects of the economy's collapse on ordinary people, it is still "powerful and poignant." It has received praise from The New York Times, The Boston Globe, and The Independent, among other sources.

=== F for Phone ===
Kilroy contributed an essay to Winter Pages 1 https://winterpapers.com/volumes/volume-1 about her cognitive struggles post-childbirth.

=== Soldier Sailor ===
Kilroy's fifth novel, Soldier Sailor (Faber & Faber, 2023), was published after a significant gap from her fourth due to some of the challenges outlined in F for Phone. The novel takes the form of a first-person narrative by a young mother (Soldier) who is overwhelmed by the reality of parenting her son (Sailor). The Times described it as a "brilliant, angry, arresting new novel" and containing "the best 30 pages of fiction you'll read this year." The Observer called it a "tour de force" and "an astonishing high wire act". In 2024 it was shortlisted for the Women's Prize for Fiction.
