= Tom Rosenthal =

Tom Rosenthal may refer to:

- Tom Rosenthal (actor) (born 1988), British actor and comedian
- Tom Rosenthal (footballer) (born 1996), Israeli footballer
- Tom Rosenthal (musician) (born 1986), British musician
- Tom Rosenthal (publisher) (1935–2014), British publisher
