= John Banville: A Critical Introduction =

1989 book by Rüdiger Imhof

- Author: Rüdiger Imhof
- Subject: John Banville
- Genre: Literary criticism
- Publisher: Wolfhound Press
- Publication date: 1989
- Media type: Print
- Pages: 199
- ISBN: 0-86327-186-3

John Banville: A Critical Introduction is a 1989 book by Rüdiger Imhof, which is the first full-length appraisal of the work of major turn of the century writer John Banville.

Imhof's book has been characterised as "formalist" by Joseph McMinn, whose John Banville: A Critical Study appeared two years later.

Imhof's book was republished in 1997 following the arrival of The Untouchable.
