= Hélène Rytmann =

French revolutionary, sociologist

- Born: 15 October 1910; Paris, France
- Died: 16 November 1980 (aged 70); Paris, France
- Occupations: Revolutionary, sociologist

Hélène Rytmann (15 October 1910 – 16 November 1980) was a French revolutionary and sociologist. She was active as a communist militant in the French resistance to Nazism. A member of the French Communist Party, she was expelled for Trotskyism. The party also alleged she had engaged in summary executions of Nazi collaborators.

Rytmann was murdered by strangulation in 1980 by her husband Louis Althusser. Her murder attracted much attention from the French media and there were requests to sentence Althusser as an ordinary criminal, but he was instead declared unfit to stand trial by reason of insanity and committed to a psychiatric institution for three years.

== Early life ==
Rytmann was born in Paris in 1910 to a Jewish family of Russian and Lithuanian origin. According to Althusser, Rytmann was sexually abused as a child by her family doctor. At age 13, the doctor forced Rytmann to administer a lethal dose of morphine to her father who was suffering from terminal cancer; the following year, Rytmann was forced to administer another lethal dose to her terminally ill mother. However, this story could have been invented by Althusser, who admitted to incorporating "imagined memories" into his "traumabiography."

Her brother Joseph Rytmann owned several cinemas in Paris.

== Resistance activities ==
During the German occupation of France, Rytmann refused to wear the yellow star mandated by the Nazis and instead joined the French resistance. As a militant, she was a comrade of Jean Beaufret and was affiliated with the "Pericles" division of the French resistance. She joined the French Communist Party, but was later expelled for "Trotskyist deviation" and "crimes". It was alleged that she had participated in summary executions of former Nazi collaborators in Lyon. The same charges were made when she was expelled from the Mouvement de la Paix in 1950. These allegations remain unproven to this day. Hélène Rytmann is also sometimes known as Hélène Legotien or Hélène Legotien-Rytmann because her cover name during the French Resistance was "Legotien", a name she continued to use.

== Murder ==
On 16 November 1980, Rytmann was murdered by her husband by strangulation at their apartment at the École normale supérieure. Her husband crushed her larynx and killed her. The murder was never thoroughly investigated. In January 1981, Althusser was deemed unfit to serve trial under Article 64 of the French penal code, with Althusser claiming "diminished responsibility" due to mental illness.

Rytmann is buried in the Jewish section of Cimetière parisien de Bagneux in Paris.

== Legacy ==
John Banville's 2002 novel Shroud was partly inspired by the scandal of Rytmann's murder.

The Forward has cited Rytmann as an example of an historically important Jewish woman who had "changed France" and that it was "high time that Hélène Rytmann be remembered with dignity as an individual" for her role in the French Resistance.

== Bibliography ==
- Althusser, Louis; Althusser, Hélène; Corpet, Olivier. Lettres à Hélène : 1947–1980, Grasset, Paris, 2011.
