= Prosperity Drive =

Short story collection

- Author: Mary Morrissy
- Language: English
- Genre: Short story collection
- Publisher: Jonathan Cape (hardback) & Vintage (paperback)
- Publication date: 2016 (Jonathan Cape) & 2017 (Vintage)
- Pages: 277
- ISBN: 978-1-784-70057-7

Prosperity Drive is a 2016 short story collection by Irish author and journalist Mary Morrissy. The collection comprises 18 short stories ranging from 7 to 24 pages and revolves around several families, primarily the Elworthy family, who reside on the fictional urban Prosperity Drive in Dublin. Across the 18 stories and roughly forty years between the 1960s and the early 2000s, the intricate connections within and between the residential families are untangled through a non-linear mode of narration and multiple, mutually illuminating points of view.

Morrissy has cited James Joyce as an influence on her short stories.

== Stories ==
=== The Scream ===
The Alzheimer’s-riddled Edel Elworthy has taken a fall in her Prosperity Drive home. Edel speculates that her 37-year-old daughter Norah, who is her primary caretaker, is slow in coming to her rescue as payback for Edel’s indifference to her children when they were young.

Immobilized, Edel recounts an incident when she locked the temperamental young Norah into a cubbyhole beneath the stairs to punish her for misbehaving. Her husband Victor, who was gentler with their children, curled up with Norah in the cubbyhole. Edel found them with Norah on his lap in an embrace she considered “seductive.” The intimacy of the moment sparked a chilling suspicion in Edel, who kept close watch of them afterwards. The meaning of the embrace is left ambiguous.

Victor was diagnosed with cancer when Norah was ten. The younger daughter, Trish, was sent away on holiday to Courtown with Irene Devoy and her sons. Victor died soon after.

Norah finally finds Edel, whose memory starts to fail.

=== The Gender of Cars ===
Aged 11, a defiant Norah Elworthy bears witness to her mother selling her recently deceased father’s treasured black Austin A40. She reflects on Victor’s impact on her life and likens the process of watching the car’s decay to the progressive loss of her father. Norah keys the flank of the car, and the new owner drives off without noticing the damage.

At 17, Norah goes on her first date with 21-year-old bicycle mechanic Dave. Her romantic fantasies are crushed when he drives them to a Lovers' lane where he forces her to sexually pleasure him. Afterwards, Norah rejects Dave’s offer for a drink, and he drives her home. Once he drops her off in Prosperity Drive, Norah smashes his wing mirror with a spanner.

=== Lot's Wife ===
Gabriel, “Gabe”, Vance is a failed priest who coaches swimming classes to children at the YMCA. He is a paedophile who, back in Ireland, was discovered hiding in the girls’ changing rooms at a communal pool. As he has never abused a child, Gabe is convinced he is not a pervert.

Starting at the age of seven, back in the 1960s, Gabe was “groomed” for the clergy by his Uncle Pascal, a missionary priest in Sudan, who took Gabe under his wing.

The story is interspersed with paragraphs on aquatic fauna, such as polliwogs, minnows, and sharks. Gabe uses them as metaphors to categorize the girls that attend his swimming class by age groups.

Gabe associates Ireland with a sheep field where he was sexually assaulted as a child by a deranged outcast, Aggie, who framed the abuse as “swimming.” Afterwards, Aggie had warned him not to look behind himself, at her, by referencing Lot's wife.

=== Gracefully, Not Too Fast ===
As a child, Ruth Denieffe is a gifted singer. Driven to earn her affluent father’s pride, she takes vocal lessons with the renowned, blind musician Mr Jozsef Polgar, a Polish immigrant. Ruth desperately tries to please him, and he slights her when he introduces his star pupil Bridget Byrnes to their classes to practice duets. Bridget is superior to Ruth in talent and beauty, but Ruth perceives her as inferior due to her underclass status. Mr Polgar unites the girls’ lessons so that Bridget can profit from Ruth’s privileges.

While rehearsing for a junior duets’ competition, Ruth realizes that Bridget is illiterate. She leaves Bridget in the lurch when Mr Polgar urges her to sing unfamiliar lyrics. Mortified, Bridget flees from the room and drops her lessons. A year later, Mr Polgar cancels Ruth’s lessons.

Later in life, Ruth educates adults on how to teach reading and writing to illiterate grown-ups.

=== Diaspora ===
The story ping-pongs between the perspectives of the homeless Maurice, “Mo”, Dark and TERF-teacher Trish Elworthy, who suspect that they spotted each other at an airport in Malaga. They recollect growing up together in Prosperity Drive and falling in love. Trish’s mother Edel disapproved of the class difference between their families, especially due to the identity of Mo’s father, which his mother Neet had never disclosed, and Edel suspects to be African. Nurse Audrey Challoner interrupted their first tryst at the mortuary of St Jude’s Hospital, where Neet worked. Their relationship ended when their plan to run away together to Kilburn was destroyed by Trish jilting Mo at the terminal.

In Malaga, Trish ditches her flight back to Italy and approaches Mo.

=== Miss Ireland ===
The story chronicles the events leading up to the suicide of the 19-year-old maid of the Devoy family, Marguerite Quinn, nicknamed "Quinny".

Irene Devoy, mother of Rory, Owen, and Fergal, and a former Miss Ireland, takes an instant shine to the stunning Quinny, who is unreceptive to Irene’s advice. Tensions spike after Quinny melts into sobs over neighbourhood children sacrilegiously playing “Mass and Congregation.” Irene’s husband Liam tells her that Quinny came from a “home,” which Irene believes was an orphanage.

Toddler Owen adores Quinny. During the family’s annual vacation at a chalet in Courtown, Quinny is photographed on the beach dunes, holding baby Fergal. The image is turned into a postcard that Irene buys for Owen after Quinny’s death.

Back home, Quinny takes Owen on secret trips, such as one to Nelson's Pillar and calls him “her little boy”, to Irene’s dismay.

Quinny’s parents attend her funeral. Liam reveals that “the home” was a Mother and Baby Home, potentially a Magdalene laundry, and Quinny had to give her baby up.

As an adult, Owen becomes engaged to the Vietnamese immigrant Kim, whom he advertises as the prospective daughter Irene never had. Remembering Quinny, Irene dismisses the notion.

=== Claims and Rebates ===
Hugh Grove is the 39-year-old sleazy head of the “Claims” department of a major company, who makes it a side-quest to seduce his barely legal subordinates. Wallflower Norah Elworthy, 19, and the new face at the company, is his latest target. Hugh is a father and married to Elaine. Agitated by Hugh’s trysts, Elaine threatens to kick him out.

At a company Christmas party, Hugh’s wooing of Norah escalates during a romantic slow dance. Realizing that Norah reciprocates his desire, he backs off and returns home. In the new year, Hugh plants a pornography magazine with debauched depictions in Norah’s assigned folders. To his disappointment, Norah remains impassive and leaves through the magazine without causing a scene. She relocates to another department soon after.

12 years later, Norah bumps into Hugh at a bar. Shaken by a run-in with her soon-to-be ex-husband Louis, Norah confronts Hugh about the magazine, which had not shocked her as she had been desensitized by an exhibitionist when she was eleven. Norah propositions Hugh.

=== The Great Wall ===
Newlyweds Dr. Owen Devoy, a 31-year-old art historian, and Kim Nguyen, a 23-year-old pharmacy student, whose nickname “Murph” is derived from the comparable frequency between the Vietnamese surname “Nguyen” and the English “Murphy,” spend their honeymoon in Venice. After a passionate start, their trip rapidly sours when Owen fails to show empathy for Murph’s past as a refugee and one of the Vietnamese boat people who arrived in Ireland in 1979, and pressures her to go on a gondola ride.

Murph’s reluctance is due to trauma from the sea voyage and the Galang Refugee Camp in Indonesia. Both Murph and her sister Mai were sexually abused during legs of the journey.

A switch of point-of-view reveals Owen’s faded memories of Quinny, the now missing seaside postcard, and the first meeting of Kim and his mother during which he wondered if Irene would take in Kim as a daughter, as he believes she had hoped to do with Quinny.

=== Love Child ===
27-year-old Julia Fortune arrives at a Manhattan hotel for a three-night stay over Christmas, 1987. On the transatlantic flight, she meets Thaddeus “Ted” Gavin, who asks her to grab a drink with him after they land at JFK. Julia rejects him, and they part ways.

Heartbroken by the recent end of a three-year relationship, Julia intends to commit suicide.

Snippets of Julia’s sudden and unexpected childhood friendship with the new girl in Prosperity Drive, the US-American immigrant Hettie Gardner, are revealed intermittently. The doting Gardeners provided a refuge from Julia’s parents, who had little affection for her.

In New York, Julia introduces herself to fellow hotel guest Gloria as “Hettie” before tearfully revealing that a good friend of hers has died. She recounts Hettie’s untimely death 15 years prior in a bicycle accident, which exiled Julia from the bereaved Gardners’ home.

With Gloria, she mourns the death of her friend “Julia.” Later in the night, Julia burns her passport, deciding to end her life.

=== Twelve Steps ===
Ted Gavin is an aspiring author who lives in Arkansas and teaches college writing classes. On Thursdays, he frequents the bar Skipper, where he meets the alcoholic regular Paula Spears. Unbeknownst to her, Ted feeds her troubled life story into the semi-autobiographical novel he is writing to flesh out the character based on his mother.

After Paula misses one of their drinking sessions, a mystified Ted uses her story as a writing exercise in class. His students unmask that Paula is a real person, and Valerie, a devout Christian, insists that Paula needs an intervention. Ted angers her by calling her writing weak.

Soon after, Valerie and other students confront them at the Skipper and expose Ted. Furious, Paula tells Ted that she pities him and leaves with a triumphant Valerie.

Three months later, a miserable Ted has lost all respect from his students. He has not seen Paula once, who has allegedly joined a twelve-step program at a Christian rehab facility.

=== Drag ===
The story is composed in second-person narration. The identity and gender of the demure protagonist and their brusque and confident best friend George are obfuscated until the last pages. References to queerness riddle the story. Since childhood, the protagonist had emulated their overbearing mother, who dressed lavishly in drag for occasions that never came.

At a work party, the protagonist—a secretary of the arrogant foot surgeon Mr Stafford, who calls them His Girl Friday—contemplates the beginning of their 25-year friendship with George, a nickname for Georgina. After meeting in secretarial school, the unlikely pair holidayed in Rome where, upon flirting with two brothers at the Piazza Navona, the protagonist broke down in tears imagining what their late mother would think of this dalliance.

Pondering over her role at the party where she acts as the stand-in hostess for her boss’ sick wife, the protagonist reveals herself to be Paulina Larchet, dressed in drag to fit in as the affluent surgeon’s date.

=== Assisted Passage ===
Anita, the 18-year-old daughter of St Jude’s Hospital superintendent, immigrates to Australia on the ocean liner Australis. Her uncle Ambrose sponsors the trip and nicknames her "Neet".

Anita shares a cabin with three girls: Stasia Keans, Muriel Kendall, and Lil Kuller. Romances commence as soon as they depart. When they land in Aden, Yemen for a brief stay, Anita loses her way in the illustrious Crescent Hotel and ends up having sex with an employee, Mohammed. The journey recommences with Anita relishing the secrecy of the encounter while her cabinmates continue to harbour romantic fantasies.

One by one, the girls leave the Australis. By the time Ambrose picks up Neet at the Circular Quay in Sydney, she is pregnant.

=== Clods ===
Norah, now the head of an educational department, reunites with her soon to be ex-husband Louis for the countryside funeral of his mother, Mrs Plunkett. They commiserate about their mothers’ diseases. As Louis had relocated to the US, Norah once visited her mother-in-law in the hospital, although Mrs Plunkett had always been cold to her. Mrs Plunkett told her that with Louis gone overseas, neither of the two women “had” him.

They retire to the Plunkett’s family residence to drink and have sex in Mrs Plunkett’s bed. Passion fizzes out fast when Louis lapses into self-pity, and Norah departs at the break of dawn without a goodbye.

=== Boom ===
The story is laced with the onomatopoeia of Tim Shaw’s first words “Dee-da” that his father misheard as “Da-dee”. Tim’s childhood overlapped with The Troubles, and he witnessed his mother’s affair with a man named Denis that ended in 1974 when, after a fight between the lovers in the shoe store Bradleys send them into opposite directions of Nassau Street, Dublin. Shortly after, the third car bomb of the Dublin and Monaghan bombings detonated there. The story suggests that Denis was a victim of the explosion.

As an adult, Tim works as a sound engineer and is in a relationship with the stewardess Regina, “Reggie”, whom he sees sporadically. He was once in a relationship with failed singer Ruth Denieffe. After catching news of a bomb exploding in Paris, Tim struggles with the memories of The Troubles before recalling that Reggie is currently in Paris. When he calls her, he discovers, through the telltale cadence of ambulance sirens, that she is in Rome with another man.

At a family dinner, Tim’s parents reminisce on Tim’s first “Dee-da.”

=== Chinese Burns ===
Tending to her deteriorating mother, Norah suffers from caretaker burnout. She inflicts a Chinese burn on the nearly unresponsive Edel.

Norah reflects on her frustration over Trish’s absence. She blames their lifelong distance on their five-year age gap. Trish had often been left in the dark about family pain such as the stillbirth of the middle child, Patrick. This secret-keeping came to a head during a spat when a 14-year-old Trish tried to wheedle Norah into telling her about the Christmas party at which Hugh tried to seduce her. Annoyed by Trish applying a “Chinese burn” on her arm, Norah spitefully told her about their brother.

Norah fails to reach Trish, who is living in Italy. Desperate to capture her attention, Norah tells Trish’s roommate Claudia that Edel died. When an emotional Trish calls back, she confesses that she was in love with Norah’s ex-husband Louis. Blindsided, Norah hands the phone to Edel.

=== Body Language ===
Trish works as a teacher in Perugia, where she has been living for ten years. She is agitated by Norah’s frequent updates about their mother’s worsening condition and Norah’s accusatory undertone over Trish’s absence.

Three months after Norah’s last call, Trish travels home for their mother’s imminent death. On the airplane, she recounts falling in love with Louis during Norah’s and his gaudy engagement party on a boat.

The sisters hover at their mother’s hospital bed for a week. Charged silence prevails until a hallucinating Edel mumbles to her long-deceased husband Victor that she once killed a cow. Shocked, the sisters break into hysterical laughter and get ushered out by a reproachful nurse. They end up missing Edel’s death.

=== Sick, Dying, Dead and Buried ===
Audrey Challoner is a nearly 50-year-old nurse at St Jude’s where she treats cancer-stricken children. An avid reader, her private library stars Ted Gavin’s collection of short stories, “Diaspora.” Audrey credits her preference for short stories to an insufficient attention span.

Audrey recounts a summer when she was 19 and almost quit the profession after the passing of a five-year-old boy. In the aftermath, she watched Prosperity Drive’s children play a self-made game they christened “Sick, Dying, Dead and Buried.” Around the same time, the children, commanded by ringleader Norah Elworthy, organized a “Bring-and-Buy sale” for the “starving children” of Biafra.

Barry Denieffe, Ruth Denieffe’s brother, recalls the sale that was commandeered by the headstrong Norah at his AA-meetings decades later and reminisces about the death of the then 11-year-old Finn Motherwell.

A dying Victor is overcome with longing for more time with his daughters, especially Norah.

Irene Devoy is wheedled into contributing to the charity sale by Norah, who has staged Mo Dark as a Biafran orphan. Irene pilfers Owen’s treasured postcard of Quinny and slips it into a magazine that she donates with other knick-knacks.

Audrey bought the magazine and credits the postcard of the unknown mother and baby with giving her the strength not to leave St Jude’s.

=== While You Wait ===
Edel Forristal, a young woman from Mountmellick, meets and boldly asks out the older Victor Elworthy, a linotype operator for The Irish Press, while she is working at Roches Stores where he makes use of their “While You Wait” service.

Edel takes Victor to the countryside to meet her disapproving family. Victor’s saving grace is his Ford Zodiac with which he carts the family members around. To the dismay of Edel’s mother, Victor tries to teach Edel how to drive. During one such lesson, Edel collides with a Friesian cow. Instead of letting Edel call for help to take the fatally-injured animal out of its misery, Victor hectors her into driving on. They hide the battered car overnight and never speak of the incident again.

== Development ==
In an interview with Loredana Salis, Morrissy reflected on the creative process behind Prosperity Drive. Her motivation to craft a collection of short stories that can function as standalone pieces but converge to an interlinked text stemmed from a drive to see “how you can push the boundaries of the short story form” by stretching its typical form and attempting to mimic key characteristics of novels. Numerous of Prosperity Drive’s short stories have featured in other publications, including Arrows in Flight (Scribner/Townhouse), Bridges: A Global Anthology of Short Stories (Temenos), and New Irish Short Stories (Faber).

Morrissy’s editor at Jonathan Cape called the resulting “scattering” of stories from the centre outward (reflective, as Morrissy says, of a diaspora) an “exploded novel.” Prosperity Drive partly resembles a fix-up novel.

== Style / Themes ==
Memories, the pervasiveness of death, alcoholism, secrets, (taboo) sexual desires, and abuse permeate the life stories of Prosperity Drive. Morrissy has stated that she is keen on exploring dynamics that are “transgressive, particularly […] sexually transgressive” in her tamer and tabooer stories.

Prosperity Drive reworks multiple historical events, such as the1974 Dublin and Monaghan bombings, Irish humanitarian aid for Biafra, and the Vietnamese boat people who immigrated to Ireland. The collection is imbued with the underlying influence of the Celtic Tiger and Irish emigration to the US and the European mainland, as well as immigration to Ireland, especially by Slavic peoples.

Morrissy taps into a spectrum of literary techniques and narrative styles, shifting between points of view. Memories are braided into the narratives in free indirect speech or stylized via concrete demarcations such as indentations and italicizations.

The mosaic of stories repetitively recontextualizes keepsakes, such as Owen’s postcard of Quinny, depicting how a single token acquires distinct meaning for its various owners.

Morrissy credits her precise, unflowery prose to the ruthless editing process she acquired and honed while working as a journalist and her years critiquing her pupils’ writing.

== Reception ==
Upon publication, Prosperity Drive amassed favourable reviews. Critics primarily cited Morrissy’s astute observations of bleak ordinary life and the facets of human behaviour as driving forces behind Prosperity Drive’s moving impact. In a 2016 review for the Guardian, Claire Kilroy commended Morrissy’s seamless navigation of temps perdu as a triumph of the collection and compared Prosperity Drive to Dubliners.

Éilís Ní Dhuibhne hailed Morrissy as “a true heir to Chekhov and the great writers” and praised the momentum that Morrissy derives from prioritizing “minor incidents” over “sensational events.”

Anne Cunningham, for the Irish Independent, likened Prosperity Drive’s prose to that of John Banville and Alice Munro.
