= Quirke (TV series) =

British-Irish crime drama television series

- Genre: Crime drama
- Written by: Andrew Davies; Conor McPherson
- Directed by: John Alexander; Diarmuid Lawrence; Jim O'Hanlon
- Composer: Rob Lane
- Countries of origin: United Kingdom; Ireland
- Original language: English
- No. of series: 1
- No. of episodes: 3

Production
- Executive producers: Jessica Pope; John McColgan; Ed Guiney; Joan Egan
- Producer: Lisa Osborne
- Production location: Dublin
- Cinematography: Alan Almond; Tony Miller; Ruairi O'Brien
- Running time: 90 minutes
- Production companies: BBC Drama Production; Element Pictures; Tyrone Productions

Original release
- Network: RTÉ One
- Release: 16 February – 2 March 2014
- Network: BBC One
- Release: 25 May – 8 June 2014

Quirke is a crime drama television series that was first broadcast on BBC One and RTÉ One in 2014. The three-part series is based on the Quirke novels by John Banville, writing under the pseudonym Benjamin Black, and was adapted by Andrew Davies and Conor McPherson.

== Regular cast ==
- Gabriel Byrne as Quirke
- Nick Dunning as Malachi Griffin
- Aisling Franciosi as Phoebe Griffin
- Michael Gambon as Judge Garret Griffin
- Geraldine Somerville as Sarah Griffin
- Stanley Townsend as Inspector Hackett
- Brian Gleeson as Sinclair

== Complete main cast ==
Character	Christine Falls	The Silver Swan	Elegy For April
Quirke	Gabriel Byrne	Gabriel Byrne	Gabriel Byrne
Malachy Griffin	Nick Dunning	Nick Dunning	Nick Dunning
Phoebe Griffin	Aisling Franciosi	Aisling Franciosi	Aisling Franciosi
Jdg. Garret Griffin	Michael Gambon	Michael Gambon	Michael Gambon
Insp. Hackett	Stanley Townsend	Stanley Townsend	Stanley Townsend
Sinclair	Brian Gleeson	Brian Gleeson	Brian Gleeson
Sarah Griffin	Geraldine Somerville	Geraldine Somerville	
Deirdre Hunt	Anne Gill	Charlie Murphy	
Rose Crawford	Sara Stewart		Sara Stewart
Sister Stephanus	Lesa Thurman		
McCoy	Diarmaid Murtagh		
Brendan Boyle	Peter Coonan		
Davy	Frank O'Sullivan		
Fr. Hawkins	Garrett Lombard		
Brenda Rutledge	Janet Moran		
Dolly Moran	Bríd Brennan		
Costigan	Pat Laffan		
Josh Crawford	Donald Sumpter		
Delia	Aoibhinn McGinnity		
Sister Dominic	Deirdre Donnelly		
Claire Stafford	Catherine Steadman		
Maisie	Jane McGrath		
Andy Stafford	Shane Taylor		
Garda Dermot		Sam McGovern	Gerard Adlum
Maggie		Áine Ní Mhuirí	
Billy Hunt		Branwell Donaghey	
Hakim Kreutz		Aaron Neil	
Mrs. Cuffe-Wilkes		Donna Dent	
Leslie White		Lee Ingleby	
John Millican		David Murray	
Jimmy Minor			Colin Morgan
Bill Latimer			Ian McElhinney
Patrick Ojukwu			Obi Abili
Margaret			Bernadette McKenna
Mrs. Leetch			Barbara Adair
Isabel Galloway			Flora Montgomery
Oscar Latimer			Aidan McArdle
Celia Latimer			Dearbhla Molloy
Fr. Anselm			Denis Conway

== Production ==
Quirke was commissioned by Danny Cohen and Ben Stephenson. The executive producers are Jessica Pope for the BBC, Ed Guiney for Element Pictures and Joan Egan for Tyrone Productions and Lisa Osborne as producer. A £389,388 production loan from the Irish Film Board was provided for the series. The series was filmed in Dublin, from 19 November 2012 to 8 March 2013. Filming locations include Baggot Street, Camden Street and the main set at Clancy Barracks.

RTÉ One began broadcasting the series before BBC One, debuting on 16 February 2014. The series has been sold to five broadcasters and will air in Germany (Degeto), Croatia (HRT), Denmark (Danmarks Radio), Iceland (RÚV) and Slovenia (RTV). The series was also broadcast on BBC UKTV in New Zealand in March 2014 and on NERIT in Greece in January 2015. The series began broadcasting in the US (PBS) on 3 April 2015, and on Knowledge Network in Canada in August 2015.

== Episode list ==
No.	Title	Directed by	Written by	Original release date
1	"Christine Falls"	John Alexander	Andrew Davies	16 February 2014 (RTÉ One); 25 May 2014 (BBC One)
Guest starring: Denis Conway, Peter Coonan, Michael Gambon, Brian Gleeson, Jane McGrath, Diarmaid Murtagh, Peter O'Byrne, Frank O'Sullivan, Geraldine Somerville, Catherine Steadman, Sara Stewart, Shane Taylor and Lesa Thurman
2	"The Silver Swan"	Diarmuid Lawrence	Andrew Davies	23 February 2014 (RTÉ One); 1 June 2014 (BBC One)
Guest starring: Branwell Donaghey, Sam McGovern, Charlie Murphy and Aaron Neil
3	"Elegy for April"	Jim O'Hanlon	Conor McPherson	2 March 2014 (RTÉ One); 8 June 2014 (BBC One)
Guest starring: Colin Morgan, Chris Newman, Flora Montgomery, Neana Nimotobi and Noni Stapleton

== Home media ==
The DVD edition of Quirke was released in the UK on 9 June 2014.
