= Miriam Hodgson =

British editor of children's books

- Born: Miriam Ann Rosenthal; 10 December 1938; Rusholme, Manchester, England
- Died: 14 November 2005 (aged 66); St George's Hospital, Tooting, London
- Education: Perse School for Girls
- Alma mater: St Anne's College, Oxford
- Occupation: Editor of children's books
- Spouse: Julian Russell Hodgson
- Children: 1
- Parent(s): Erwin Isak Jacob Rosenthal; Elisabeth Charlotte Rosenthal, née Marx
- Relatives: Tom Rosenthal (brother)

Miriam Ann Hodgson (née Rosenthal, 10 December 1938 – 14 November 2005) was a British editor of children's books. In their obituary, The Guardian called her "one of the most successful children's books editors of the last 20 years, and one of the best loved".

== Early life ==
Hodgson was born on 10 December 1938 at Denison House, Denison Road, Rusholme, Manchester, as the only daughter of Erwin Isak Jacob Rosenthal (1904–1991), a Hebrew scholar and orientalist, and his wife Elisabeth Charlotte Rosenthal, née Marx (1907–1996). Her brother was the publisher Tom Rosenthal. She was educated at the Perse School for Girls in Cambridge followed by St Anne's College, Oxford where she earned a degree in modern history in 1960.

== Career ==
She started her career at the publishers Ernest Benn (which later became Associated Book Publishers) as an editor of adult books, and it was where she met her husband, Julian Russell Hodgson, then head of the education department.

After the birth of her only child, she returned to work part-time as a children's books editor and in 1986 became editorial director of publishing at Methuen Children's Books.

Hodgson edited the work of "many of the best children's writers of her time," including Jamila Gavin, Michelle Magorian, Anne Fine, Michael Morpurgo, Caroline Pitcher, Carlo Gebler, Theresa Breslin, Bel Mooney, and Jenny Nimmo.

Hodgson compiled anthologies for teenagers of stories, mostly from authors she edited, including Heartache (1991), Mother's Day (1992), Mixed Feelings (1997), and Sisters (1998).

== Awards ==
In 1999 she was awarded Editor of the Year at the British Book Awards, and in 2003 she won the Eleanor Farjeon Award from the Children's Book Circle "for outstanding services to children's literature."

== Personal life ==
On 28 November 1969, she married her publishing colleague Julian Russell Hodgson, head of the education department at Ernest Benn, son of the Rev. John Hodgson, at St Pancras Register Office. They had one daughter named Elinor.

== Later life ==
Hodgson died of ovarian cancer at St George's Hospital in Tooting, London on 14 November 2005.
