= The Sea (novel) =

2005 novel by John Banville

- The Sea book cover
- Author: John Banville
- Language: English
- Genre: Novel
- Publisher: Picador
- Publication date: 3 June 2005
- Publication place: Ireland
- Media type: Print (Hardcover & Paperback)
- Pages: 200 pp (hardcover)
- ISBN: 0-330-48328-5
- OCLC: 60419387

The Sea is a 2005 novel by Irish writer John Banville. It was the recipient of the 2005 Booker Prize.

== Plot ==
The story is told by Max Morden, a self-aware, retired art historian attempting to reconcile himself to the deaths of those he loved as a child and as an adult.

The novel is written as a reflective journal; the setting always in flux, wholly dependent upon the topic or theme Max feels inclined to write about. Despite the constant fluctuations, Max returns to three settings: his childhood memories of the Graces—a wealthy middle-class family living in a rented cottage home, the "Cedars"—during the summer holidays; the months leading up to the death of his wife, Anna; and his present stay at the Cedars cottage home in Ballyless—where he has retreated since Anna's death. These three settings are heavily diced and jumbled together for the novel's entire duration.

Max's final days with Anna were awkward; Max does not know how to act with his soon-to-be-dead wife. Scenes of Anna's dying days are more full of commentary than with actual details, as are most of the novel's settings. It's through these commentaries that we learn of Max's choice to return to the cottage of his childhood memories (after Anna's death), confirming that a room would be available for residence during a visit with his adult daughter, Claire.

We learn of the Cedars' current house-maid, Miss Vavasour, and her other tenant: a retired army colonel, often described as a background character (even during his important role in the denouement). The colonel is also seen, at the beginning of Max's stay, to have a crush on Miss Vavasour; Max suspects Miss Vavasour had entertained the colonel's slight infatuation prior to Max's own arrival.

Despite the actual present day setting of the novel (everything is written by Max, after Anna's death, while he stays in the Cedars' house), the underlying motivation to Max's redaction of memories, the single setting which ties the novel together, are Max's childhood memories. With Max's unreliable, unorganised and omitted iteration of events, we gradually learn the names of the Graces: Chloe, the wild daughter; Myles, the mute brother; Connie, the mother; Carlo, the father; and finally the twins' nursemaid, Rose. After brief encounters, and fruitless moments of curiosity, Max becomes infatuated with Connie Grace upon first sight; seeing her lounging at the beach launches him to acquaint Chloe and Myles in, what Max stipulates to have been a conscious effort to get inside the Cedars, hence, closer to Mrs. Grace. He succeeds. Later, Max recounts being invited on a picnic—for what reasons or what specific time during the summer is never explicitly stated—where Max, in awe, catches an unkempt glance at her pelvic area. This day of "illicit invitation" climaxes when Max is pulled to the ground, and snuggled closely with Connie and Rose in a game of hide-and-seek.

The latter half of his summer memories (the relation of Max's memories in the second part of the novel), however, revolve around Max's awkward relationship with Chloe: a girl with a disabled personality and blunt demeanor whom Max describes as one who "[does] not play, on her own or otherwise". Chloe is shown as a volatile character: flagrantly kissing Max in a Cinema, rough-housing with her brother Myles, and what was hinted as hypersexuality earlier, is quite possibly confirmed as hypersexuality in the book's final moments.

We soon learn that Chloe and Myles like to tease Rose, who is young and timid enough to feel bullied. Max, another day, climbs a tree in the yard of the Cedars' house, and soon spots Rose crying not too far from him. Mrs. Grace soon emerges, comforting Rose. Max overhears (rather, Max remembers overhearing) key words from their conversation: "love him" and "Mr. Grace". Assuming this to mean Rose and Mr. Grace are having an affair, he tells Chloe and Myles. The ending of the book entwines the exact moment of Anna's death with Chloe and Myles drowning in the sea itself as Max and Rose look on. Max, done with his childhood memories, offers a final memory of a near-death episode while he was inebriated. The colonel does not physically save Max, rather finds him knocked unconscious by a rock (from a drunken stumble). His daughter scolds him at the hospital, assumingly being told he nearly killed himself, and tells him to come home with her. It is revealed at this point that Miss Vavasour is Rose herself and she was in love with Mrs. Grace. Max finishes with a redaction of himself standing in the sea after Anna's death (an allegory is made between crashing waves and tumultuous periods of his life). We are to assume that he will leave the Cedars' home to be cared for by his daughter, Claire.

== Development ==
Banville described the book as "a direct return to my childhood, to when I was ten or so. The book is set in a fictionalized Rosslare, the seaside village where we went every summer as children. Looking back now it seems idyllic, though I'm sure ninety-five percent of the experience was absolute, grinding boredom". The book also began in the third person—"Shroud was the latest in a series of novels of mine in the first person, all of them about men in trouble. I knew I had to find a new direction. So I started to write The Sea in the third person. It was going to be very short, seventy pages or so, and solely about childhood holidays at the seaside—very bare. I worked on it for about eighteen months, but I couldn't get it to work. And then, out of nowhere, the first-person narrative voice made itself heard again." The Sea was completed in September 2004.

== Reception ==
=== Critical reception ===
The poet Michael Longley expressed admiration for The Sea, and described Banville as "a wonderful writer". During an interview conducted several years after the death of his friend Seamus Heaney, Longley recalled: "I remember Seamus saying when The Sea came out, he said to me, 'Isn't it wonderful to be part of a culture that produces prose as good as that?' I told Banville what Heaney had said. Do you know what Banville said to me? 'Did he really say that? Did he?!'" Longley munched upon a biscuit, and added: "We're all like schoolboys, really".

== Awards and nominations ==
The novel won the Booker Prize for 2005. The selection of The Sea for the Booker Prize was a satisfying victory for Banville, as his novel The Book of Evidence was shortlisted in 1989 but lost to The Remains of the Day by Kazuo Ishiguro. Ishiguro was again on the shortlist in 2005 with his novel Never Let Me Go. In fact, it was reported in The Times that they had whittled the shortlist down to those two novels and it was only the chair John Sutherland's casting vote that decided the winner. The choice of Banville as winner of the award was not seen as a populist choice, causing Banville to ponder: "If they give me the bloody prize, why can't they say nice things about me?" Banville's surprise win was described by Boyd Tonkin as "possibly the most perverse decision in the history of the award", though others defended the choice, citing the lyrical, stylistic prose as making the book worthy of the award.

In his acceptance speech Banville expressed his pleasure at a work of art winning the prize, a statement that led to him being accused of arrogance. He later explained, "Whether The Sea is a successful work of art is not for me to say, but a work of art is what I set out to make. The kind of novels that I write very rarely win the Man Booker Prize [as it was then referred to], which in general promotes good, middlebrow fiction."

Rick Gekoski, one of the Booker judges who argued for The Sea, later wrote in its defence: "'It is a work of art, in the tradition of high modernism, and I'll bet it will still be read and admired in 75 years".

== Adaptations ==
A film adaptation has been shot, with Banville having penned the script. It is directed by Stephen Brown and stars Ciarán Hinds (Max Morden), Rufus Sewell (Carlo Grace), Charlotte Rampling (Miss Vavasour), and Natascha McElhone (Connie Grace). It is produced by Luc Roeg and scored by Andrew Hewitt, with cinematography by John Conroy.
