= Reflections (1984 film) =

1984 film directed by Kevin Billington

Reflections is a 1984 British drama film directed by Kevin Billington and starring Gabriel Byrne, Donal McCann and Fionnula Flanagan. The film is an adaptation for the British broadcaster Channel 4 of the 1982 novel The Newton Letter by John Banville, who also wrote the screenplay.

The budget was £502,000.

== Plot ==
The film follows the adventures of an aspiring biographer of Isaac Newton who rents a rural retreat in the south of Ireland to write an in-depth treatment of an obscure and disturbing letter Newton sent in 1693 to John Locke. He becomes involved with two women: Ottilie Garinger and her aunt, Charlotte. The presence of Charlotte's husband, Edward Lawless, creates a romantic triangle-plus-one.

== Cast ==
- Gabriel Byrne as William Masters
- Donal McCann as Edward Lawless
- Fionnula Flanagan as Mrs. Charlotte Lawless
- Harriet Walter as Ottilie Garinger
- Gerard Cummins as Michael Lawless
- Niall Toibin as Mr. Prunty
- Peadar Lamb as Doctor
- Des Nealon as Tom Mittler
- Margaret Wade as Bunny Mittler
- Larry O'Driscoll as Rat Man
- Noel O'Flaherty as Rat Man
