= Erwin Rosenthal =

- Born: 18 September 1904; Heilbronn, German Empire
- Died: 1991 (aged 86–87); England
- Education: University of Heidelberg; University of Berlin
- Occupations: Hebrew scholar and orientalist
- Spouse(s): Elisabeth Charlotte Rosenthal, née Marx
- Children: Tom Rosenthal; Miriam Hodgson

Erwin Isak Jacob Rosenthal (18 September 1904 – 1991), was a German-born British Hebrew scholar and orientalist.

== Early life ==
Erwin Isak Jacob Rosenthal was born in Heilbronn, Germany, on 18 September 1904 into a Jewish family. He was educated at the University of Heidelberg, and the University of Berlin where he studied History, Arabic, and Aramaic, and published his dissertation in 1932, and then with Leo Baeck, Hanokh Albeck, and Ismar Elbogen.

== Career ==
In 1933, Rosenthal and his wife left Nazi Germany and moved to London, where he was appointed as a part-time lecturer in Hebrew and North Semitic Epigraphy at University College London, then Manchester, and later Cambridge.

Rosenthal became a Fellow of Pembroke College and a Reader in Oriental Studies at the University of Cambridge.

== Selected publications ==
- Political Thought in Medieval Islam (1958)
- Judaism and Islam (Thomas Yoseloff, London, 1961)
- Islam in the Modern National State (1965)

== Personal life ==
He married Elisabeth Charlotte Marx (1907–1996), and they had two children, Tom Rosenthal a publisher, and Miriam Hodgson, an editor of children's books.
