= Rick Gekoski =

Writer, broadcaster & rare book dealer

Richard Abraham Gekoski (born August 25, 1944) is an American-born British writer, broadcaster, rare book dealer and a former member of the English Department at Warwick University.

== Early life and education ==
Gekoski was raised in Alexandria, Virginia, where his father, Bernard, worked as an attorney for the Rural Electrification Authority, and his mother Edith was a social worker. The family moved to Huntington, Long Island in 1954. He graduated from Huntington High School in 1962, and received his B.A. summa cum laude from the University of Pennsylvania in 1966, where he served as the chairman of the newly formed Student Committee on Undergraduate Education. He was elected to Phi Beta Kappa in 1965. In 1966, he was awarded a Danforth Scholarship, a Woodrow Wilson Fellowship, and a Thouron Award. He subsequently received a B.Phil. (1968) and D.Phil. (1972) in English at Oxford University, where he attended Merton College, Oxford, and won a tennis blue.

== Academic career ==
In 1971 Gekoski joined the English Department at Warwick University, where he was joint convener of the B.A. degree in philosophy and literature. He was promoted to senior lecturer in 1980, and served for two terms as chair of the Faculty of Arts. He resigned from the department in 1984 to open a business as a rare book dealer.

== Rare books ==
The Guardian put Gekoski's book-selling activities succinctly: “Gekoski likes to be around a better class of book than the rest of us, and by skill, luck and chutzpah has managed to.” He has founded two private presses, the Sixth Chamber Press and (with Tom Rosenthal) the Bridgewater Press, which issue limited editions by well-known writers. He is widely regarded as one of the leading dealers in the world, and is a member of the Antiquarian Booksellers' Association (ABA) and International League of Antiquarian Booksellers (ILAB).

== Writer ==
Gekoski has published a number of memoirs and non-fiction books: Staying Up (about football), Tolkien’s Gown and Guarded by Dragons (about book dealing), Outside of a Dog (about reading), which was short-listed for the PEN/Ackerley Prize, and Lost, Stolen or Shredded (about art).

Irish writer Colm Tóibín has called their author “a supreme example of a natural and skilled story teller”, and Tatler described him as the Bill Bryson of the book world.

In 2017 he published his first novel, Darke, which was shortlisted for the McKitterick Prize and the Authors' Club Best First Novel Award. It was followed in 2019 by A Long Island Story. In 2020 he published Darke Matter, which was followed in 2022 by After Darke, the final book of the James Darke trilogy. The Times called him "a late-flowering genius of a novelist."

He was a regular contributor to the Guardian on-line book section through his column "Finger on the Page" which covered topics from the world of books, including reading, writing, teaching and book-selling.

== Broadcaster ==
Gekoski regularly appeared on radio as a guest commentator on topics relating to rare books and the book trade. He has written and produced three series of Rare Books, Rare People for BBC Radio 4 – called “one of the gems of Radio 4” by critic Gillian Reynolds – which he followed with two series of Lost, Stolen, or Shredded: The History of Some Missing Works of Art, also for Radio 4.

== Personal life ==
In 2005, Gekoski was a Booker Prize judge, and a strong advocate for John Banville's The Sea, which proved a contentious winner. He was chair of judges for the 2011 Man Booker International Prize, which was awarded to Philip Roth.

He divides his time between writing, book dealing, broadcasting, and occasional lecturing. He has taught creative non-fiction for the Arvon Foundation, and sat on its development board. He is a former trustee and member of the board of English PEN, and was elected an honorary vice-president of that body in 2014 for his work organizing and curating an auction of annotated first editions by famous writers, held at Sotheby's in May 2013. Entitled "First Editions, Second Thoughts", the auction raised £438,000 to further the work of English Pen. Highlights included annotated first editions by Julian Barnes, Quentin Blake, Kazuo Ishiguro, J. K. Rowling, Colm Tóibín and Jeanette Winterson, among others.

Gekoski and his wife Belinda Kitchin live in a seventeenth-century house in Salisbury. He has two children from a previous marriage. In 2008 Gekoski became a British citizen.

== Books ==
- Joseph Conrad. The Moral World of the Novelist. Paul Elek and Barnes and Noble, 1978.
- William Golding: A Bibliography. With P. A. Grogan. – André Deutsch, 1994.
- Staying Up: A Fan Behind the Scenes in the Premiership. – Little Brown, 1998.
- Tolkien's Gown and Other Stories of Great Authors and Rare Books. – Constable and Robinson, 2004. Published in the US as Nabokov's Butterfly, Carroll and Graf, 2004.
- Outside of a Dog. A Bibliomemoir. – Constable and Robinson, 2009.
- Lost, Stolen or Shredded: Stories of Missing Works of Art and Literature. – Profile Books, 2013.
- Darke. A novel. Canongate Books, 2017.
- A Long Island Story. Canongate Books, 2018.
- Darke Matter. Constable Books, 2020.
- Guarded by Dragons: Encounters with Rare Books and Rare People, Constable Books, 2021.
- After Darke, Constable Books, 2022.
