= Joseph Rytmann =

French cinema operator

- Born: 26 January 1903; Barysaw, Russian Empire
- Died: 12 December 1983 (aged 80); Créteil, France
- Occupation: Cinema operator

Joseph Rytmann was a French cinema operator who owned several cinemas in Paris during the 20th century. Rytmann was known as the "Emperor of Montparnasse".

== Early life ==
Rytmann was born in 1903 in Barysaw, Russian Empire (now Belarus) to a Jewish family. He was the brother of the sociologist and revolutionary Hélène Rytmann.

== Career ==
In 1933, Rytmann assumed ownership of the Théâtre de Montrouge cinema (which late became Mistral) on Avenue du Général-Leclerc in Paris. In 1938, he created the Miramar cinema in Montparnasse, which is now known as the Gaumont Parnasse.

Rytmann's cinemas were plundered during the Nazi occupation of France. Rytmann fled Vichy France for the Zone libre. He survived World War II, afterwards fighting in court to successfully regain ownership of his cinemas. He then opened additional cinemas in Paris, including the Bretagne and the Montparnos.

Rytmann played a prisoner in the 1973 Claude Lelouch film Happy New Year (1973).

Rytmann's daughter Benjamine Radwanski-Rytmann took over the management of the Rytmann cinemas between 1984 and 2010. At that time, the cinemas were sold to Pathé-Gaumont, with the exception of the Bretagne cinema. She later sold the Bretagne cinema in 2021.

L'Harmattan published a book about the life of Joseph Rytmann in 2021, with a preface written by Claude Lelouch.

== See also ==
- Cinema of France
