= Eclipse (Banville novel) =

2000 novel by John Banville

- Cover of first edition
- Author: John Banville
- Language: English
- Genre: Novel
- Publisher: Picador
- Publication date: 2000-09-22
- Publication place: Ireland
- Media type: Print (Hardcover and Paperback)
- Pages: 208 pp (hardcover)
- ISBN: 0-330-33933-8
- OCLC: 247400045

Eclipse is a 2000 novel by John Banville. Its dense lyrical style and unorthodox structure have prompted some to describe it as more prose poem than novel. Along with Shroud and Ancient Light, it comprises a trilogy concerning actor Alexander Cleave and his estranged daughter Cass.

== Plot and themes ==
As the novel begins, protagonist Alexander Cleave, a 50-year-old, disillusioned actor, retreats to his empty childhood home for an indefinite period of introspection, leaving his wife Lydia behind. He seeks to uncover, as he says, "the blastomere of myself, the coiled hot core of all I was and might be" from years of accreted guises. Banville is concerned in this novel with "the elusive and unstable nature of identity." Cleave's ruminations, which take up the majority of the novel, engage with issues of the nature of selfhood and personal identity, familial life and responsibilities, and the unreliability of memory.

The book also addresses epistemological themes. Cleave's solitude is interrupted by what he provisionally believes to be ghosts, "sightings, brief, diaphanous, gleamingly translucent, like a series of photographs blown up to life-size and for a moment made wanly animate." Later he discovers furtive squatters in his house. He also receives portents of the fate of his estranged daughter, Cass, the meaning of which he does not apprehend until the story's conclusion. Of this, Alex Clark writes in The Guardian, ″Ghosts, it appears, can exist in the future as well as the past; whether or not we choose to respond to their beckoning is another matter.″

== Reception ==
A review of the book in The New York Times stated: "Like Nabokov, Banville captures the vivid aesthetic pleasures of quotidian reality in the most satisfying ways....At such moments, his dream of dislocation and transport becomes ours. This is watchfulness as the first step toward engagement, and so back into life." Robert MacFarlane is equally enthusiastic, writing: "The book is ornately written, heartless in an honest fashion, profoundly interrogative of ideas of identity and, above all, spectacularly beautiful. It is, in ways that so many contemporary novels are not, a work of art".
