= The Newton Letter =

1982 novella by John Banville

- First edition (publ. Secker & Warburg)
- Author: John Banville
- Language: English
- Publication date: 1982

The Newton Letter is a 1982 novella by John Banville. Drawing comparisons with Ford Madox Ford's The Good Soldier and John Hawkes's The Blood Oranges for their use of the unreliable narrator, The Newton Letter was described in The New York Times as Banville's "most impressive work to date". Colm Tóibín has stated that the book, among others by Banville, ought to have won the Booker Prize

It was first published in 1982 by Secker & Warburg, and in the United States in 1987 by David R. Godine. It was published as a paperback by Panther Books in 1984, then again in 1999 by Picador. Kevin Billington directed in 1984 a film adaptation for the British broadcaster Channel 4, Reflections with Gabriel Byrne, Harriet Walter and Fionnula Flanagan.

The book opens with: "Words fail me." It follows the adventures of an aspiring biographer of Isaac Newton who rents a rural retreat in the south of Ireland to write an in-depth treatment of an obscure and disturbing letter Newton sent in 1693 to John Locke. He becomes involved with two women: Ottilie Garinger and her aunt, Charlotte. The presence of Charlotte's husband, Edward Lawless, creates a romantic triangle-plus-one. The story is loosely based on Johann Wolfgang von Goethe's 1809 novel Elective Affinities, from which it takes its main characters Charlotte, Ottilie and Edward.

The Newton Letter is the third of Banville's "scientific tetralogy" (preceded by Doctor Copernicus and Kepler, followed by Mefisto, a reworking of the Faust theme). The writer has suggested that those who wish to sample his work begin with this work ("It's pretty well all there. And it's short.")
