= Athena (novel) =

1995 novel by John Banville

First edition (publ. Secker & Warburg) Cover artist George Frederic Watts, The Minotaur, 1885

Athena is a 1995 novel by the Irish author John Banville, the third in a series that started with The Book of Evidence and continued with Ghosts. These three form the "Frames" trilogy, linked by the theme of paintings.

The novel is centred around Morrow, a self-styled art expert. He is asked by a businessman called Morden to authenticate a number of paintings which are old and supposedly valuable. Morrow becomes romantically involved with a woman he simply calls A. who appears to have stepped out of his canvasses. The police become involved and Morden and A. abruptly disappear. Morrow is left grief stricken.

The story is punctuated by several appraisals of paintings by fictitious artists.

Reviewers compared it favourably with the writing of John Fowles, William Gass, John Hawkes and Vladimir Nabokov.

== Plot summary ==
Morrow is the central character and narrator of the story, which is set in Ireland. He makes several references to his troubled past: that he has been in prison, that "life means life", that he "knew a man who killed a woman", and that he has changed his name. The suggestion is that he is Freddie Montgomery, the villain of The Book of Evidence.

In this story he falls in with a shady businessman called Morden. Morrow is apparently some sort of art expert. Morden has a secret stash of paintings which he says are old masters, and asks Morrow to check whether they are genuine. The police have been watching Morden, led by Chief Inspector Hackett (who also appears in Banville's Quirke series). Morrow worries that if the paintings are genuine he could go to jail for dealing with them. The police bring in their own art expert, who declares that the paintings are all fakes; Morden then claims that he simply had copies made for his own use.

The second main theme of the book is Morrow's infatuation with a younger woman who he simply calls A. - "my alpha, my omega". They have a torrid affair. A. is the dominant partner in the relationship, and is an exhibitionist and a masochist.

Another character in the story is an elderly relative of Morrow's called Aunt Corky. There is a vivid and humorous description of this lady, not unlike the style of Charles Dickens. For reasons which are not clear, Morrow takes her away from the residential care home where she lives and brings her to his inadequate flat, where she eventually dies.

Shortly after the arrival of the police, Morden and A. suddenly disappear. It is revealed that A. is Morden's sister, and another unsavoury character The Da is their father.

A. leaves Morrow a note asking him to write, but leaves no address. Morrow now talks at length of his grief and feelings of loss. The book has been described as "the ultimate break-up novel".

It is finally revealed that one of the eight paintings was in fact genuine, and the other seven fakes were done to disguise the real one.
