= Mrs Osmond =

Irish novel

Mrs Osmond is a novel by the Irish author John Banville, published in 2017. It is based on the 1881 novel The Portrait of a Lady by the American-British author Henry James. The Henry James novel describes how a young American heiress Isabel Archer marries Gilbert Osmond, a widower. It emerges that Osmond married her for her money, a scheme brought about by Osmond’s mistress Serena Merle. The marriage is an unhappy one, and Isabel is faced with various alternatives; however, the outcome of the story is ambiguous. In Banville's retelling of the story, Isabel is able to use her wealth to resolve the situation mostly to her satisfaction.

== Plot summary ==
Isabel Osmond, formerly Isabel Archer, is an American woman in her late 20s. She has married Gilbert Osmond, also an American, a widower older than her. They live in Rome with Pansy, Osmond’s teenage daughter from his first marriage. Isabel has an aunt, Lydia Touchett and a cousin, Ralph Touchett who live in England; they are a wealthy family and reside in a country house known as Gardencourt. The other main character in the story is Serena Merle, also American, who is a long-standing friend of Isabel and the Touchetts.

Isabel travels to Gardencourt to be with Ralph who is dying. She then travels to London to visit two friends to seek their advice about her future. Isabel reveals that her marriage is under great strain. She had inherited a substantial fortune from the Touchetts, and it now appears that Osmond only married her for her money. Both Osmond and Serena Merle have lived in Italy for several years, and it was Merle who introduced Osmond to Isabel. Isabel remarks on the “easy mutual intimacy" between her husband and Merle. She tells her friend that she now “intends to use her fortune to buy her freedom”.

She relates how Osmond had banished his daughter Pansy to a convent because of a relationship he disapproved of: he had wanted her to marry an aristocrat. Osmond blamed Isabel for interfering in this match.

Isabel now travels to Paris, en route to Rome. In Paris she unexpectedly meets Serena Merle. Merle says she has sold her house in Florence and is moving back to America; however, Isabel persuades her to go back to Italy where “she will provide for her”.

Isabel gradually realises the full extent of the treachery of Merle and her husband. Some of this she learns from Amy the Countess Gemini, Osmond’s sister, and some from her maid Staines, who had known Merle’s maid. Osmond had met Merle in Naples while Osmond was married to his first wife and Merle was estranged from her husband. An affair developed and Merle fell pregnant. Osmond’s wife was in poor health yet he took her to live in a town where fever was rife, and she succumbed to the disease. After her death and the birth of Merle’s child, Osmond returned to Florence claiming the child to be that of his late wife. Pansy is therefore Osmond and Merle’s child.

Isabel now meets Osmond to confront him and to state her terms. She says “I want my freedom from you, and Pansy’s too”: she wants to remove Pansy from the malign influence of her parents. Isabel is the sole owner of the home she and Osmond occupy in Rome, the Palazzo Roccanera. However, she transfers the ownership of the property to Serena Merle, with the proviso that Osmond can still live there. Her sister-in-law comments “You have devised a hell for them to torment each other in!”

Isabel now finally leaves Rome and travels to London. There she meets her sister-in-law and Pansy. However Pansy is cool towards her and it is clear that her wish for them to live together will not happen.

== Reception ==
Mrs Osmond attracted critical acclaim both for its intrinsic literary style and also for being true to the character of the Henry James original. Eileen Battersby in The Irish Times said “James did not write a sequel. Irish writer John Banville has – and has done so with wit, daring, vivid description and a sense of fun.” Edmond White in The Guardian wrote “At times it has the glacial pace of the original, endless psychological dithering punctuated by brilliant flashes of melodrama. Even stylistically it is a perfect fit … the metaphors are devoted to extremely vivid, even over-the-top, language.” In The Guardian Tim Adams said “His book is not only an impressive recreation of James’s atmospheres and pacing, but also full of minor cliff hangers and page-turning suspenses that keep you guessing”. Jeffrey Eugenides in The New York Times said “For eight pages, he enters the mind of Gilbert Osmond … this shift of perspective lets the reader view the original story anew. Banville’s ability to channel James’s style and prose rhythms is astonishing.” Lucy Scholes in The Independent wrote “Banville … adds layers of intricacy to James’s work; each of Banville’s characters satisfyingly convincing in their new guises. Banville conscientiously provides all the details first-time readers need to know to understand the story.”

A minority of critics were less positive: Joseph Bottum in The Washington Free Beacon said "The book is oddly paced - dilatory and meandering in its descriptions and slow scene setting, then suddenly furious in driving toward a conclusion."
