= The Infinities =

2009 novel by John Banville

- First edition cover
- Author: John Banville
- Language: English
- Genre: Novel, Alternate History
- Publisher: Picador
- Publication date: 4 September 2009
- Publication place: Ireland
- Media type: Print (Hardback)
- Pages: 256 pp
- ISBN: 978-0-330-45024-9
- OCLC: 373479667
- Preceded by: The Sea

John Banville talks about The Infinities on Bookbits radio

The Infinities is a 2009 novel by John Banville.

== Plot introduction ==
The book involves a reunion of the Godley family as the family patriarch, Adam, lies in a coma on his deathbed. The book takes place in an alternative reality with the world powered by cold fusion and steam trains are still in use. His family, consisting of Adam his son (and Adam's wife Helen), his daughter Petra and his wife Ursula are present at this reunion. The story is narrated by the god Hermes, who dictates how the story will unfold along with his father Zeus and his mother Maia.

== History ==
Banville intended The Infinities as a faithful adaptation of the play Amphitryon by the German playwright Heinrich von Kleist. The novel did not turn out quite like this though - "I kept the Skeleton, but fiction always goes in its own direction."

== Reception ==
"In the 1980s, Banville challenged his readers to imagine a Nabokov novel based on the life of a Gödel or an Einstein," wrote Irish literary critic Val Nolan in The Sunday Business Post. "The Infinities is finally that book. Old Adam's lineage runs through Oppenheimer, Hilbert, Brahe, Kepler, and hence to Banville's so-called Revolutions Trilogy of science novels."
