= Tom Rosenthal (publisher) =

British publisher (1935–2014)

- Born: Thomas Gabriel Rosenthal; 16 July 1935; London, England
- Died: 3 January 2014 (aged 78)
- Education: The Perse School; Pembroke College, Cambridge
- Occupation: Publisher
- Spouse: Ann Warnford-Davis (née Shire)
- Children: 2 sons
- Parent(s): Erwin Isak Jacob Rosenthal; Elisabeth Charlotte Rosenthal, née Marx
- Relatives: Miriam Hodgson (sister)

Thomas Gabriel Rosenthal (16 July 1935 – 3 January 2014) was a British publisher and art critic.

== Early life ==
Thomas Gabriel Rosenthal was born on 16 July 1935 in London, the son of Erwin Isak Jacob Rosenthal (1904–1991), a Hebrew scholar and orientalist, and his wife, Elisabeth Charlotte Rosenthal, née Marx (1907–1996), both refugees from Nazi Germany. His sister was the children's books editor Miriam Hodgson.

He was educated at The Perse School in Cambridge, followed by Pembroke College, Cambridge, where he earned a degree in history and English.

== Career ==
Rosenthal joined the publishing company Thames & Hudson in 1959. He was head of Secker & Warburg from 1971 to 1984 and later Andre Deutsch Publishers.

In 1997, he founded the Bridgewater Press with his friend the rare book dealer Rick Gekoski, producing limited editions usually in editions of 138 copies.

He was chairman of the Institute of Contemporary Arts.

== Personal life ==
Rosenthal was married to Ann Warnford-Davis (née Shire), a literary agent, and had two sons, Adam, a surgeon specialising in gynaecological oncology, and Daniel, an author.
