= Ancient Light =

Novel by John Banville

- Cover of first edition
- Author: John Banville
- Language: English
- Publisher: Viking Penguin
- Publication date: 2012-07-05
- Publication place: Ireland
- Media type: Print (Hardcover)
- Pages: 245 pp (hardcover)
- ISBN: 978-0-670-92061-7

Ancient Light is a 2012 novel by John Banville. First published on 7 July 2012, the novel concludes a trilogy concerning Alexander Cleave and his daughter, Cass. Eclipse (2000) and Shroud (2002) were Ancient Light's literary predecessors in the Banville canon.

Banville dedicated Ancient Light to the literary editor Caroline Walsh, whose recent sudden death had left him devastated.

== Plot and themes ==
Ancient Light is narrated by Alexander Cleave, a 60-something year-old retired actor, and takes place 10 years after the death of his daughter Cass in Eclipse. Cleave begins to record his memories of a first, unlikely affair he had at age 15 with Mrs Gray, a married woman 20 years his senior. "Billy Gray was my best friend and I fell in love with his mother." The book moves between memories of this affair and his current state of grief he shares with his wife Lydia, touching on themes of family, love, grief, and the reliability of memory. His solitude is interrupted by an offer to play the lead in a film entitled The Invention of the Past. The film is to be based on the life of literary theorist Axel Vander, the man with Cass when she killed herself in Italy. On the set Cleave bonds with Dawn Devonport, an emotionally fragile young ingenue mourning the death of her father. As Cleave continues to narrate his past relationship with Mrs Gray to its inevitable conclusion, the father-daughter relationship grows between him and Dawn.

== Reception ==
Critical reception for Ancient Light was primarily positive, with a reviewer for UK newspaper The Independent calling it a "luminous, breathtaking work."

Critics for The Guardian also reviewed Ancient Light, with Tim Adams praising Banville's themes and "cleverness", while Alex Clark praised the dual narrative as "disorienting". UK newspaper The Daily Telegraph gave the book three out of five stars, writing that it is "notably, though for the most part seamlessly, light-fingered – strings of Yeses from Ulysses, bits of Eliot, a hazel wood from Yeats, a lovely quote from Leopardi". The Harvard Crimson stated that '[t]he major weakness of "Ancient Light," however, lies is not in its moments of gimmickry but in its vagueness'.

The writer Colm Tóibín named Ancient Light as one of his books of the year.

Ancient Light won in the Novel category at the 2012 Irish Book Awards.

== Artwork ==
The cover photograph of a man and a woman dancing in a kitchen was taken by Elliott Erwitt and is titled "Spain, Valencia, 1952, Robert and Mary Frank". Andrew Winer also used the photograph for the book cover of The Marriage Artist (2010, Henry Holt & Company) and Mark Knopfler used it for the album The Ragpicker's Dream.
