= April in Spain =

2021 novel by John Banville

- First edition cover (hardcover)
- Author: John Banville
- Language: English
- Genre: Fiction
- Publication date: October 5, 2021
- Media type: Print (Hardcover, Paperback)
- Pages: 320
- ISBN: 9781335471406
- Preceded by: Snow
- Followed by: The Lock-Up

April in Spain is a novel by Irishman John Banville, first published in October 2021 by Hanover Square Press. The novel, a mystery, takes place in the 1960s. Pathologist Quirke and his wife travel from Ireland to holiday in Spain. While vacationing, Quirke recognizes a woman as someone presumed murdered in Ireland, but whose body was never found. He sets off an investigation to uncover the woman's identity with the help of his daughter. The book received generally favorable reviews.

== Background ==
The novel is the 8th entry in the Inspector Quirke Series. Banville published the book under his own name, after using the pen name Benjamin Black for earlier entries in the series. April in Spain also features Detective Inspector St John Strafford, a prominent character in other of Banville's novels, and it reprises characters from Elegy for April (2010).

== Contents ==
Pathologist Quirke travels with his wife, Evelyn, to San Sebastián, Spain. He struggles with boredom on the vacation, but becomes intrigued when he faintly recognizes a woman. The woman, who goes by Angela Lawson, works as a doctor, and Quirke meets her while receiving treatment for an injury to his hand. Quirke believes Lawson is really April Latimer, a woman presumed murdered in Ireland. April belonged to a politically active family troubled by internal sexual abuse. April's brother claimed to have killed her before taking his own life, though the police never recovered her body.

Quirke enlists the help of his daughter, Phoebe, to help identify whether Lawson really is April. Phoebe contacts April's uncle, William Latimer, to share these suspicions. Latimer, a powerful minister in the government, is uncomfortable with the news. She also tells Detective Chief Superintendent Hackett that she plans to go to Spain to investigate. Hackett insists that Inspector St John Strafford accompany her. After a confrontation in Spain, April admits her true identity to Phoebe.

Latimer, upset at the reappearance of his niece, arranges for a contract killer, Terry, to dispatch April. Terry is a troubled orphan who has already murdered several people. He finds April in the hospital, but she escapes, throwing acid in his face. Terry tracks her to Quirke's hotel, where he attempts to shoot her. Strafford manages to kill Terry, but not before Terry fatally shoots Evelyn. In Ireland, Latimer is called to account for his part in orchestrating the attack. He had arranged April's disappearance to avoid scandal and to prevent her from sharing her knowledge that he was supplying weapons to militants.

== Reception ==
The novel received mostly positive reviews for the intrigue of the plot and the development of the characters. In a review for The Wall Street Journal, Tom Nolan wrote that "the prose is rich with similes and the plot shocks with its violence". Doug Battersby of Financial Times described the work as an "impeccably executed novel, incisive in its dissections of characters' psychologies". He reserved some criticism for the novel's predictability. Writing for The Scotsman, Allan Massie praised the writing and the exploration of various themes, noting that the work is a "social and political novel too, concerned with the arrogance of power and pervasive moral corruption".
