= Ghosts (Banville novel) =

1993 novel by John Banville

- First edition
- Author: John Banville
- Language: English
- Publisher: Secker and Warburg
- Publication date: 1993
- Publication place: Ireland
- Media type: Print (Hardcover & Paperback)
- Pages: 224
- ISBN: 0-436-19991-2
- Preceded by: The Book of Evidence
- Followed by: Athena

Ghosts is a 1993 novel by John Banville. It was his first novel since 1989's The Book of Evidence, which was shortlisted for the Booker Prize. The second in what Banville described as a "triptych", to make "an investigation of the way in which the imagination works." This novel features many of the same characters and relates to events of the previous novel.

== Plot summary ==
The novel is somewhat unconventional and non-linear in its construction. It begins with a group of travellers disembarking on a small island in the Irish Sea after their ship runs aground. There they stumble upon a house inhabited by Professor Kreutznaer, his assistant Licht, and an unnamed character who figures centrally in the novel and who is referred to only as "Little God." It is later revealed that Little God can be identified with Freddie Montgomery, the narrator of The Book of Evidence. The first part of the novel describes the travellers and the interactions between them. Much of the latter half of the book focuses on Montgomery's account of his experiences after having been released from prison, his reflections on the crime (the murder of a young woman) he committed, and his continuing struggle with the ghosts of his past and the nature of his perceptions.

Kreutznaer's relationship to a painting entitled The Golden World by a fictional Dutch artist named Vaublin plays a central role in the novel. The fictional painting is based to a large extent on The Embarkation for Cythera by Watteau. The narrator mentions "Cythera" several times and, to a certain degree, the characters are modelled on those in the painting. It is revealed that Kreutznaer and one of the travellers—a man named Felix—are acquainted with one another, and that Felix had been involved in art forgery. The novel ends with the travellers re-embarking and leaving the island, with many of the central issues and tensions left unresolved.

== Reception ==
Wendy Lesser in The New York Times described the novel as "violently obsessed with art", and an example of Banville's interest in "humankind's strange mixture of passions for the beautiful and the violent, especially in combination," similar to that of the film director Peter Greenaway. She notes that it recalls Shakespeare's play, The Tempest, beginning with a group of travellers cast up on an island together and meeting its inhabitants. Montgomery, known as "little god", sees himself as master of the cast, like Prospero. But Lesser notes the book is not about plot but about language, and she found it more satisfying and well done than The Book of Evidence.

Banville described this as the second novel in a "triptych", saying he wanted to focus and reveal characters in language, as figures in a triptych are revealed in paint.
