= Shroud (Banville novel) =

2002 novel

- Author: John Banville
- Publisher: Picador
- Publication date: 2002
- ISBN: 978-0-330-48315-5
- Preceded by: Eclipse (2000)
- Followed by: Ancient Light (2012)

Shroud is a 2002 novel by John Banville. It is the second book in the Alexander and Cass Cleave Trilogy, which also contains the novels Eclipse (2000) and Ancient Light (2012).

== Plot summary ==
Axel Vander, famous man of letters and recently widowed, travels to Turin to meet a young woman called Cass Cleave. Cleave is a literary researcher who has discovered two secrets about Vander's early years in Antwerp. The first is that, in the years prior to World War Two, Vander contributed some antisemitic articles to a right-wing newspaper, and secondly, that he is not Axel Vander at all. He is Vander's childhood friend; he appropriated Vander's name and identity after the man disappeared and was presumed dead. Cleave is obsessed with him and is also suffering from a psychotic mental illness.

After they meet in Turin, a claustrophobic relationship develops between them. Ultimately this leads to Cleave's tragic death.

== Background ==
The novel is partly inspired by two scandals concerning eminent academics that occurred in the 1980s: the posthumous discovery of antisemitic texts written during World War II by Yale school literary critic Paul de Man, who had an influential postwar career in the United States; and the murder by Louis Althusser of his wife Hélène Legotien. Althusser was a well-known Marxist philosopher.

== Style ==
Banville has said that this is one of his favourite novels—"a dark, hard, cruel book", one in which he came closest to achieving what he set out to write at the start of the writing process. He also noted that "Everybody hated Shroud—even, I think, the people who admired it. It was favourably reviewed, but it was not and is not a book a reader could readily love. Shroud is my monstrous child whom I cherish but who horrifies others."

Shroud has been described as one of his most emotionally intense novels. Alex Clark in The Guardian talks of "its immense, self-supporting power. Shroud certainly demonstrates (Banville's) ability to generate extreme tension and utterly uncanny atmospheres." Vander is arrogant and self-absorbed, and treats Cass Cleave with contempt. "Vander in old age is simultaneously demonic, monstrous and clownish". "For Vander, all of life has been a denial of his authentic self—in short, a performance".

== Reception ==
Upon release, Shroud received starred reviews from Publishers Weekly and Kirkus Reviews.

Colm Tóibín has stated that the book ought to have won Banville the Booker Prize.
