= Kepler (novel) =

1981 historical novel by John Banville

First edition (publ. Secker & Warburg) Cover art: Albrecht Dürer, Knight, Death and the Devil, 1513)

Kepler is a novel by John Banville, first published in 1981.

In Kepler, Banville recreates Prague, despite never having been there when he wrote it. A historical novel, Kepler won the 1981 Guardian Fiction Prize.
