= Doctor Copernicus =

1976 novel by John Banville

- First UK edition (publ. Secker & Warburg)
- Author: John Banville
- Language: English
- Publication date: 1976

Doctor Copernicus is a novel by John Banville, first published in 1976. "A richly textured tale" about Nicolaus Copernicus, it won that year's James Tait Black Memorial Prize.

Doctor Copernicus contains four sections. The first two focus on the subject's life until about the age of 36. In the third, Copernicus's aide Rheticus narrates how he convinced Copernicus to publish De revolutionibus orbium coelestium. The fourth focuses on the great scientist's death.

Thirty years after it first appeared, Brian McIlroy praised Doctor Copernicus for its "great intellectual ambition." Linda Hutcheon, in A Poetics of Postmodernism, wrote that it is a "historiographic metafiction."
