= Quirke (series) =

Irish crime novels

The Quirke series of crime novels, written by Irish novelist John Banville, centres on the titular character, a pathologist in 1950s Dublin. The first seven volumes in the series (published 2007–2016) appeared under the pen name Benjamin Black: subsequent volumes have appeared under Banville's own name.

The series is published by Henry Holt & Co. in the US. The first novel, Christine Falls, was first released by Picador in the UK in 2006; it was published in the US a year later.

Banville has stated that he drew from his experiences when he first moved to Dublin to inform the Quirke series:

Quirke lives in the apartment in Dublin which I inherited from my aunt and he moves around in that area where I was when I first moved to Dublin. He's better off than we were in those days, but yes, it's soaked in my recollections. It is more connected to the circumstances of my life than my Banville books.

The eighth and ninth novels in the series, April in Spain and The Lock-Up, feature investigator St. John Strafford, a "Big House" Protestant, who is also a character in other Banville works, including Snow (2020) and The Secret Guests (2022). These titles have appeared under the byline Stafford & Quirke.

== Television adaptation ==
A three-part miniseries based on the novels stars Gabriel Byrne as Quirke. The series first aired on RTÉ One in Ireland in early 2014, and later that year on BBC One in the UK.

== Books ==
1. Christine Falls (2007)
2. The Silver Swan (2008)
3. Elegy for April (2010)
4. A Death in Summer (2011)
5. Vengeance (2012)
6. Holy Orders (2013)
7. Even the Dead (2016)
8. April in Spain (2021)
9. The Lock-Up (2023)
10. The Drowned (2024)
