= The Untouchable (novel) =

1997 novel by John Banville

First edition cover

The Untouchable is a 1997 novel by John Banville. The book is written as a roman à clef, presented from the point of view of the art historian, double agent and homosexual Victor Maskell—a character based largely on Cambridge spy Anthony Blunt and in part on Irish poet Louis MacNeice.

== Details ==
The Untouchable is both comical and poignant in its delineation of the importance of double agents in the Cold War—Maskell's revelations to the Russians largely involve information of little importance or facts that appear shortly afterwards in national newspapers. The secrecy around Blunt's homosexual personal life is depicted as a balance to his role as a spy, and when homosexuality is legalised he loses a great deal of his enjoyment of his double life.

Like Blunt, Maskell is connected to the royal family and the book carries portraits of King George VI and Queen Elizabeth, and less directly of Elizabeth II (usually referred to as 'Mrs W.'). Maskell indicates that he suspects the presence of a concealed or perhaps sublimated homosexuality in the life and personality of George VI. Blunt himself was a cousin of Elizabeth Bowes-Lyon (Queen Elizabeth, later 'the Queen Mother'), and this is something that as 'Maskell' he refers to several times in the novel. Maskell undertakes a secret mission to occupied Germany to rescue some documents which could prove embarrassing to the British royal family as they indicate the extent of King Edward VIII's (later the Duke of Windsor) contact with the Nazis. He goes on to become keeper of the royal family's art collection, as did Blunt.

Blunt was actually educated at Marlborough College, where he joined the college's secret 'Society of Amici' in which he was a contemporary of Louis MacNeice (whose unfinished autobiography The Strings are False contains numerous references to Blunt). Like Maskell, he later read mathematics at university, becoming a Fellow of his college, and a member of the Cambridge Apostles, a secret society which at that time was largely Marxist, formed from members of the University of Cambridge.

Banville himself said that the motivation to write the book came from seeing Blunt smile to himself when not aware of being on camera, just before giving a press conference following the announcement to the House of Commons (by prime minister Margaret Thatcher) of his role as the 'fourth man' in the Burgess-Maclean-Philby spying ring. The small secret smile, said Banville in an interview on BBC Radio 4's Today programme, was the smile of a man who had been interrogated by the British secret services and dealt with a Soviet minder for years, and who knew he had nothing to fear from a roomful of journalists.

The book was added to The New York Times Notable Books list and the Library Journal Best Books list for 1997. Colm Tóibín has stated that the book ought to have won Banville the Booker Prize. The 1997 award went instead to Arundhati Roy for her debut novel The God Of Small Things.

== See also ==
- 1997 in literature
