= John Banville =

Irish author (born 1945)

John Banville FRSL
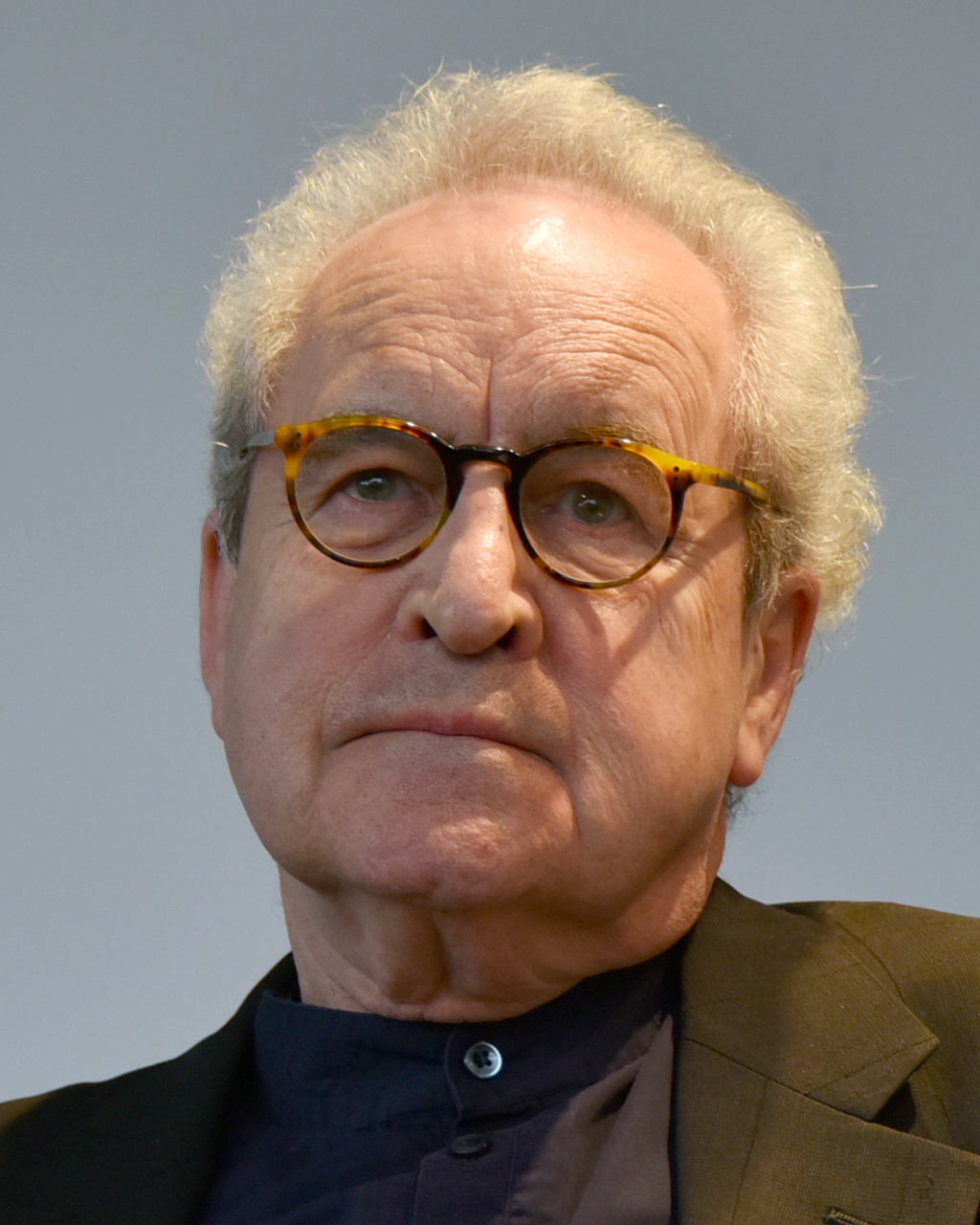
- Banville in 2019
- Born: 8 December 1945 (age 80); Wexford, Ireland
- Education: St Peter's College, Wexford
- Occupations: Novelist; Screenwriter
- Spouse: Janet Dunham (m. 1969; died 2021)
- Partner: Patricia Quinn
- Children: 4
- Writing career
- Pen name: Benjamin Black; B. W. Black
- Language: English (Hiberno-English)
- Years active: 1970s—present
- Subjects: Acting, mathematics, mythology, painting, science
- Notable works: Doctor Copernicus; Kepler; The Newton Letter; The Book of Evidence; Ghosts; Athena; The Untouchable; Eclipse; Shroud; The Sea; The Infinities; Ancient Light
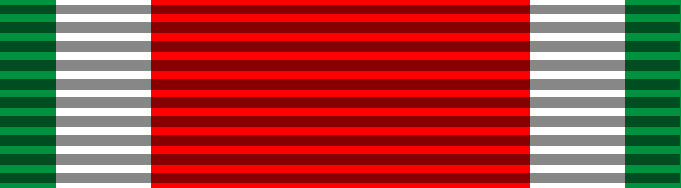
- Notable awards: James Tait Black Memorial Prize; 1976; Booker Prize; 2005; Franz Kafka Prize; 2011; Austrian State Prize for European Literature; 2013; Prince of Asturias Award for Literature; 2014 Ordine della Stella d'Italia; 2017

William John Banville (born 8 December 1945) is an Irish novelist, adapter of dramas, and screenwriter. A former member of Aosdána, he voluntarily relinquished the financial stipend in 2001 to another, more impoverished, writer.

Banville has been publishing books since 1970, when a short story collection appeared, with his first novels emerging soon after. His "Revolutions Trilogy", published between 1976 and 1982, comprises works named after renowned scientists: Doctor Copernicus, Kepler and The Newton Letter. His next work, Mefisto, had a mathematical theme, and, in combination with the three books from the "Revolutions Trilogy," is the fourth book from the "Scientific Tetralogy." Banville's 1989 novel The Book of Evidence began the "Frames Trilogy," dealing with the work of art; it was completed by Ghosts and Athena during the 1990s. This early fiction was the subject of numerous academic studies in the late 20th-century, including Rüdiger Imhof's John Banville: A Critical Introduction (1989), Joseph McMinn's John Banville: A Critical Study (1991) and The Supreme Fictions of John Banville (1999).

Doctor Copernicus won him the 1976 James Tait Black Memorial Prize, and he also won the 2003 International Nonino Prize. His thirteenth novel — The Sea — won the Booker Prize in 2005, and with it came wider international recognition for Banville among the reading public. Subsequently, he was elected a Fellow of the Royal Society of Literature in 2007, and recognised with a selection of European accolades, among which were the 2011 Franz Kafka Prize from Czechia, the 2013 Austrian State Prize for European Literature and the 2014 Prince of Asturias Award for Literature from Spain. Italy made Banville a Cavaliere (knight) of the Ordine della Stella d'Italia in 2017. Born and raised in the town of Wexford in the southeast of Ireland, and living in Howth, Dublin, he has been mentioned as a contender for the Nobel Prize in Literature.

Banville had a 30-year career working in the Irish newspaper industry, and served as literary editor of The Irish Times between 1988 and 1999. As Benjamin Black, he took to publishing crime novels in later life, mostly based in 1950s Dublin and featuring an Irish pathologist character named Quirke. An alternative history novel, The Secret Guests, was published under the name B. W. Black in 2020.

== Early life ==
William John Banville was born to Agnes (née Doran) and Martin Banville, a garage clerk, in Wexford, Ireland. The youngest of three siblings, his older brother Vincent is also a novelist, writing under the name Vincent Lawrence as well as his own. Their sister, Anne Veronica "Vonnie" Banville-Evans, wrote a children's novel and a memoir of growing up in Wexford.

Banville was educated at CBS Primary, Wexford — a Christian Brothers school — and at St Peter's College, Wexford. Though he intended to become a painter and an architect, Banville did not attend university. The decision was influenced by a desire to escape from his family; however, Banville would later describe it as a "great mistake" to have missed "four years of getting drunk and falling in love", Yet — in contrast to what he had missed — Banville stated that college would have been of little benefit to him, and he doubted whether he then "would have had the nerve" to carry out some of his earlier writings, if he had been "beaten into submission by my lecturers". Earlier — while in his teens — Banville stole a collection of Dylan Thomas's poetry from Wexford County Library.

After school, Banville worked as a clerk at Aer Lingus, which allowed him to travel at deeply discounted rates. He took advantage of such rates, travelling to Greece and Italy. Banville began working as a sub-editor at The Irish Press in 1969, and — subsequently — worked as a sub-editor at The Irish Times. He was appointed literary editor of The Irish Times in 1988, a position he held until 1999.

== Personal life ==
In 1969, Banville married the American textile artist Janet Dunham, whom he met in San Francisco the previous year while she was a student at the University of California, Berkeley. The couple had two sons together. Their marriage broke down after Banville had an affair with a neighbour, Patricia Quinn, who subsequently became director of the Arts Council of Ireland. Banville had two daughters with Quinn, born around 1990 and 1997. Despite separating, Banville and Dunham never divorced; according to Banville, they remained "on good terms." Dunham died at Blackrock Clinic on 22 November 2021, after which Banville claimed to have been overcome by "brain fog" that left him unable to write for six grief-stricken months. In a 2024 interview, he expressed regret over his relationship history, saying: "I caused Janet such anguish. I have caused Patricia Quinn such anguish. I wasn't good with my children. I was not a good parent. I am not a good person. I am selfish. But I have to have responsibility."

== Writing ==
Banville writes in the Hiberno-English dialect, and dreads the loss of this ability if he were to follow the example of other Irish writers and move abroad. He has said that he is "trying to blend poetry and fiction into some new form".

Banville published his first book — a collection of short stories titled Long Lankin — in 1970. His first published novel —Nightspawn — he disowned, describing it as "crotchety, posturing, absurdly pretentious".

As an unknown writer in the 1980s, he toured Dublin's bookshops—"and we had a lot of bookshops back then"—around the time of the publication of his novel Kepler "and there wasn't a single one of any of my books anywhere". Yet — he noted in 2012 — "I didn't feel badly about it because I was writing the kinds of books I wanted to write. And I had no one but myself to blame if I wasn't making money, that wasn't anybody's fault. Nobody was obliged to buy my books".

Banville has written three trilogies: the first (Revolutions Trilogy) focused on great men of science, and consisted of Doctor Copernicus (1976), Kepler (1981), and The Newton Letter (1982). He said he became interested in Kepler and other men of science after reading Arthur Koestler's book The Sleepwalkers. He realised that — like himself — scientists were attempting to impose order in their work. The second trilogy — referred to collectively as the Frames Trilogy — consists of The Book of Evidence (1989), with several of its characters also featuring in Ghosts (1993); Athena (1995) is the third to feature an unreliable narrator and explore the power of works of art. Banville's third trilogy was published from 2000 onwards. Consisting of Eclipse, Shroud and Ancient Light, all concern the characters of Alexander and Cass Cleave.

Banville has compared writing to the life of an athlete: "It's asking an awful lot of one's self. Every day you have to do your absolute best—it's a bit like being a sportsman. You have to perform at the absolute top of your game, six, seven, eight hours a day—that's very, very wearing". His typical writing day begins with a drive from home in Dublin to his office by the river. He writes from 9am until lunch. He then dines on bread, cheese and tea, and resumes his work until 6pm, at which time he returns home. He writes upon two desks positioned at right angles to each other, one facing a wall and the other facing a window through which he has no view and never cleans.

Since 1990, Banville has been a regular contributor to The New York Review of Books. In a July 2008 interview with Juan José Delaney in the Argentine newspaper La Nación, Banville was asked if his books had been translated into Irish. He replied that nobody would do so, and that he was often referred to — pejoratively — as a West Brit. He advises against young writers approaching him for advice: "I remind them as gently as I can, that they are on their own, with no help available anywhere".

Banville is highly scathing of each of his books: "I hate them all ... I loathe them. They're all a standing embarrassment." Instead of dwelling on the past he prefers to continually look forward, "You have to crank yourself up every morning and think about all the awful stuff you did yesterday, and how you can compensate for that by doing better today." He does not read reviews of his work as he already knows—"better than any reviewer"—the places in which its faults lie.

He wrote fondly of John McGahern, who lost his job amid condemnation by his workplace and the Catholic Church for becoming intimately involved with a foreign woman. While on a book tour of the United States in March 2006, Banville received a telephone call: "I have bad news, I'm afraid. John Banville is dead." However, Banville was aware that McGahern had been unwell and, having performed the necessary checks to ensure that he was still alive, concluded that it was McGahern who was dead instead. And it was. Banville wrote an account of Caravaggio's 1602 painting The Taking of Christ for the book Lines of Vision, released in 2014 to mark the 150th anniversary of the National Gallery of Ireland.

He contributed to Sons+Fathers, a book published in 2015 to provide funds for the Irish Hospice Foundation's efforts to give care to terminally ill patients within their own homes.

=== Crime fiction ===
Beginning with Christine Falls, which was published in 2006, Banville embarked on a crime fiction spree under the pen name of Benjamin Black. Writing his Benjamin Black stuff much more quickly and with less care than the composition of his literary novels, he appreciates his work as Black as a craft, while as Banville he is an artist. He has described crime writing as "cheap fiction". According to Banville, he writes his crime and mystery stuff on a computer, each one taking three to four months. He writes his other novels with a fountain pen, with each taking from two to five years.

Sometimes, in the middle of the afternoon if I'm feeling a little bit sleepy, Black will sort of lean in over Banville's shoulder and start writing. Or Banville will lean over Black's shoulder and say, "Oh that's an interesting sentence, let's play with that." I can see sometimes, revising the work, the points at which one crept in or the two sides seeped into each other.

The eponymous character in the Quirke series is a pathologist based in 1950s Dublin. The first three books, Christine Falls (2006), The Silver Swan (2007), and Elegy for April (2011) were made into a drama series, Quirke which — after being shown in Ireland — aired on British television. Subsequent books in this series were: A Death in Summer (2011), Vengeance (2012), Holy Orders (2013), Even the Dead (2016), April in Spain (2021), The Lock-Up (2023) and The Drowned (2024). The last three of those appeared under Banville's own name. A related book — this one also published under Banville's name — is Snow (2020). This featured a character named Detective Inspector St John Strafford, who appeared in subsequent books April in Spain and The Lock-Up.

Also published under the name Benjamin Black are crime books The Lemur (2008), The Black-Eyed Blonde (a Philip Marlowe novel, 2014), and Prague Nights (2017).

The Secret Guests (2020) is a work of alternative history crime, based on a scenario in which the young British princesses, Elizabeth and Margaret, are evacuated to County Tipperary in 1940 to escape the London Blitz and a possible German invasion of Britain. Again featuring St John Strafford, this book was published under the name B. W. Black.

== Style ==
Critics regard Banville as a master stylist of English, his writing perfectly crafted and dazzling. Called "the heir to Proust, via Nabokov", he is known for his dark humour and sharp wit.

Michael Ross called Banville "perhaps the only living writer capable of advancing fiction beyond the point reached by Beckett". Reviewing The Sea in the Irish Independent, Gerry Dukes called Banville a "lord of language".

=== Literary influences ===
John Banville talks about The Infinities on Bookbits radio

Banville said in an interview with The Paris Review that he liked Nabokov's style, but, he continued: "I always thought there was something odd about it that I couldn't quite put my finger on. Then I read an interview in which he admitted he was tone deaf." Banville has written adaptations of three of Heinrich von Kleist's plays (including Amphitryon), and used the myth of Amphitryon as a basis for his novel The Infinities.

Banville has said that, as a boy, he imitated James Joyce: "After I'd read The Dubliners, and was struck at the way Joyce wrote about real life, I immediately started writing bad imitations of The Dubliners." A profile of Banville in The Guardian said he agreed that "all Irish writers are followers of either Joyce or Beckett—and he places himself in the Beckett camp." But in a 2012 interview with Noah Charney, Banville cited W. B. Yeats and Henry James as the two main influences on his work. Responding to a suggestion that Fyodor Dostoevsky and Albert Camus were worthy comparisons, Banville said: "Dostoyevsky is such a bad writer it is hard to take him seriously... Ditto Camus".

== Views ==
Banville considers himself "incurably terrified of air travel", fearing "the plane going down amid the terrible shrieking of engines and passengers".

=== Women ===
Banville has often spoken of, and written of, his admiration for women.

He is in favour of women's rights and has welcomed the gradual freedom that has come about in his native land during his lifetime, over the course of which Ireland changed from a country dominated by Roman Catholic ideology, where women were trapped in the home with little career opportunities and subject to restrictions on the availability of contraception, to a country where the position of women became more valued and where one woman could succeed another woman as the country's President, a role previously the exclusive preserve of men. On women in his own writing, Banville told Niamh Horan of the Sunday Independent in 2012: "I don't make a distinction between men and women. To me they are just people". Horan herself noted Banville's "special flair for writing about women and delving into the female psyche".

Banville contributed the introduction to the fifty-year retrospective of Edna O'Brien's work, The Love Object: Selected Stories, calling her "one of the most sophisticated writers now at work" and saying it was "hard to think of any contemporary writer who could match her combination of immediacy and sympathetic recall". He noted how "striking" is the figuring of O'Brien's characters and acknowledged that they all "are in some way damaged by the world, and specifically by the world of men". Banville concluded by calling O'Brien "simply one of the finest writers of our time".

Banville wrote the screenplay for an adaptation of Elizabeth Bowen's novel The Last September. Bowen's work was largely neglected at the time; Vintage published new editions of each of Bowen's novels and Hermione Lee's biography of her to coincide with its release. Banville later wrote the introduction to her Collected Stories.

Close to the literary editor Caroline Walsh, Banville spoke of his devastation upon learning of her death. He dedicated Ancient Light to her. Likewise, Banville was close to Eileen Battersby, at whose funeral he was moved to tears whilst reciting a poem in her memory.

=== Crime and punishment ===
Speaking to Niamh Horan in 2012, Banville related his thoughts on hurt and responsibility: "To hurt other people is the worst thing you can do. To be hurt oneself is bad enough, but hurting other people is unforgivable... Unforgivable. Literally unforgivable. I think that one has to take responsibility for one's life and one has to take responsibility for one's bad deeds as well as one's good deeds. One has to, as I say, be responsible... Failure in art, or failure in making a living, or a success—none of them compares, everything pales beside hurting other people, because, you know, we are here for such a short time and basic life itself is so hard one has a duty to try to be decent to other people".

=== Relationship with animals ===
Ben, a labrador, lived until the age of 11 before succumbing to cancer at Christmas 1980. Decades later Banville still regarded Ben as "a lost friend, and every few months he ambles into one of my dreams, snuffling and sighing and obviously wondering why there are no more walks. This may sound sentimental, but it does not feel that way".

On 21 August 2017, the RTÉ Radio 1 weekday afternoon show Liveline was discussing a report on Trinity College Dublin's use of 100,000 animals to conduct scientific research over the previous four years when a listener pointed out that Banville had previously raised the matter but been ignored. Banville personally telephoned Liveline to call the practice "absolutely disgraceful" and told the tale of how he had come upon some women protesting:

I was passing by the front gates of Trinity one day and there was a group of mostly young women protesting and I was interested... I spoke to them and they said that vivisection experiments were being carried out in the college. This was a great surprise to me and a great shock, so I wrote a letter of protest to The Irish Times. Some lady professor from Trinity wrote back essentially saying Mr Banville should stick to his books and leave us scientists to our valuable work. After that my late friend, [Lord Gahan,?] wrote another letter to The Times and he suggested well, if vivisection is not harmful and painful to animals, why don't the experimenters themselves volunteer to undergo the experiments? ...I claim no expertise but I'm told that vivisection is of no consequence, that you don't really need it... I think if, as the vivisectionists assure us, the animals don't suffer, then why don't they volunteer themselves? It would be much better to have a human being to experiment on than an animal... [At this point the presenter questioned whether he really meant this]. I'm absolutely serious! ...why don't they conduct experiments on each other? ...We certainly should not be inflicting needless pain on innocent animals... If there's no pain, no distress... ask for human volunteers. Pay them money.

Asked if he received any other support for his stance in the letter he sent to The Irish Times, he replied:

No... I became entirely dispirited and I thought, "Just shut up, John. Stay out of it because I'm not going to do any good." If I had done any good I would have kept it on. I mean, I got John Coetzee, you know, the famous novelist, J. M. Coetzee, I got him to write a letter to The Irish Times. I asked a lot of people. Oddly, I asked uh, uh, well I won't say who it was, but I asked an international anti-vivisection person, well no, an international animal rights person, to contribute, but he said that he wasn't actually against vivisection, which seems to me a very peculiar stance to take.

This for Banville was a rare intervention of its kind, revealing to the public a different side—as he acknowledged when the presenter asked him if he had a history of objecting to activities such as blood sport:

I don't use my public voice to make protests. It was just on this one occasion it seemed that something could be done. The only effect it has had, as far as I can see, is that the following year there were about twice as many experiments. So much for the intellectual raising his voice in protest.

== Awards and honours ==
Year	Prize	Work	Ref(s)
1973	Allied Irish Banks' Prize	Birchwood	
- Arts Council Macaulay Fellowship
1975	American Ireland Fund Literary Award	Doctor Copernicus	
1976	James Tait Black Memorial Prize	
1981	Guardian Fiction Prize	Kepler	
- Allied Irish Bank Fiction Prize
American-Irish Foundation Award	Birchwood	
1984	Elected to the Irish arts association, Aosdána	
1989	Guinness Peat Aviation Award	The Book of Evidence	
- Booker Prize, shortlist
1991	Premio Ennio Flaiano	
1997	Lannan Literary Award for Fiction	The Untouchable	
2001	Voluntarily resigned from Aosdána to make way for another artist	
2003	Premio Nonino	
2005	Booker Prize	The Sea	
2006	Irish Book Awards Novel of the Year	
- British Book Awards Author of the Year, shortlist
2007	Royal Society of Literature Fellowship	
- Prix Madeleine Zepter
- Foreign Honorary Member of the American Academy of Arts and Sciences
2010	Irish Book Awards, Irish Book of the Decade, shortlist	The Sea	
2011	Franz Kafka Prize	
2012	Irish Book Awards, Novel category	Ancient Light	
2013	Irish PEN Award	
- Austrian State Prize for European Literature
- Irish Book Awards (Bob Hughes Lifetime Achievement Award)
2014	Prince of Asturias Award for Literature	
2017	RBA Prize for Crime Writing	Snow [??]	
- American Academy of Achievement's Golden Plate Award
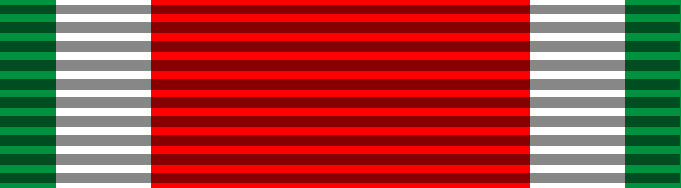
- Ordine della Stella d'Italia

=== Booker Prize ===
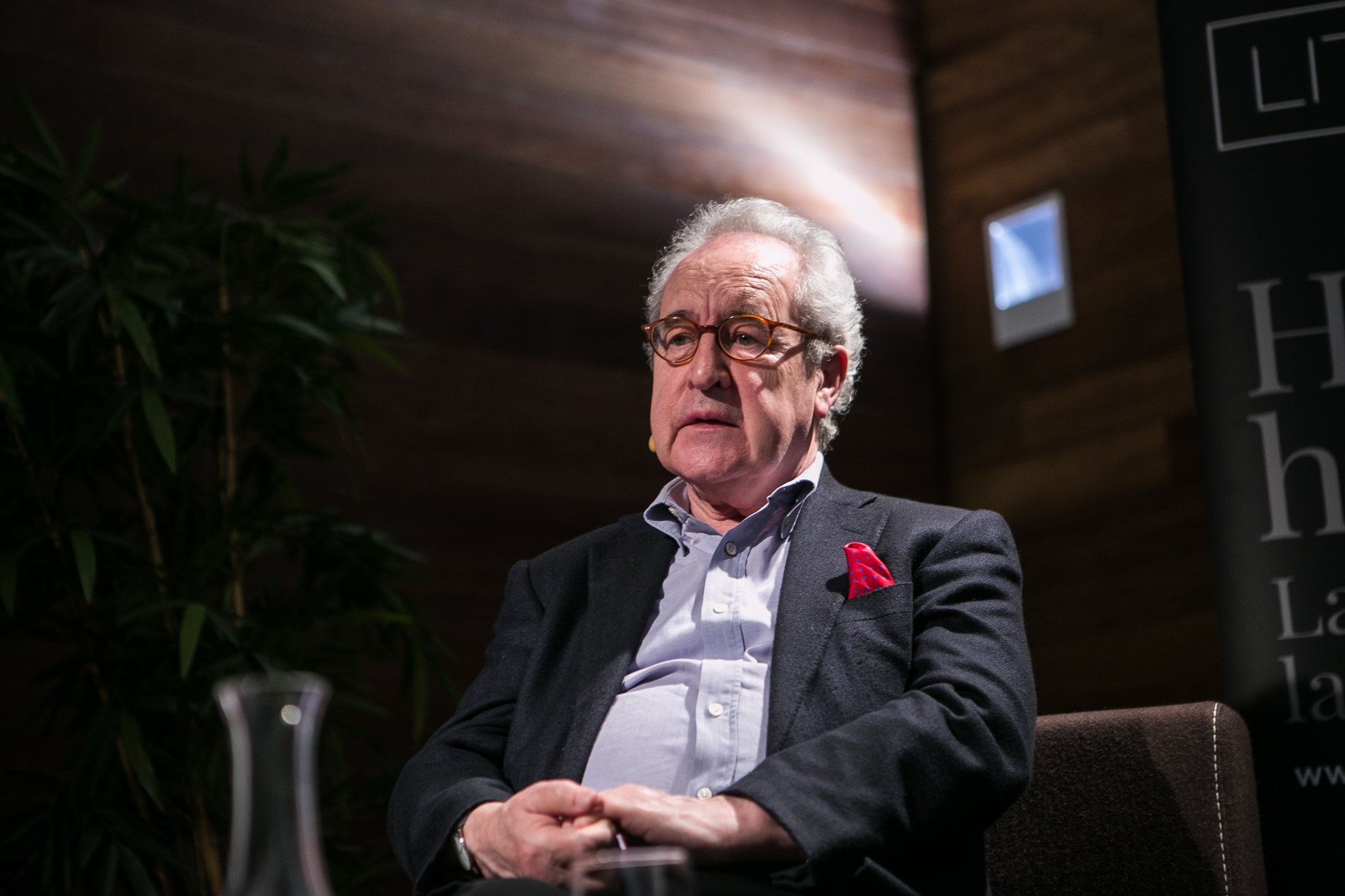
Banville in Spain in 2017

Banville wrote a letter in 1981 to The Guardian suggesting that the Booker Prize, for which he was "runner-up to the shortlist of contenders", be given to him so that he could use the money to buy every copy of the longlisted books in Ireland and donate them to libraries, "thus ensuring that the books not only are bought but also read – surely a unique occurrence".

When his novel The Book of Evidence was shortlisted for the 1989 Booker Prize, Banville said a friend he called "a gentleman of the turf" instructed him "to bet on the other five shortlistees, saying it was a sure thing, since if I won the prize I would have the prize-money, and if I lost one of the others would win ... But the thing baffled me and I never placed the bets. I doubt I'll be visiting Ladbrokes any time soon".

Banville was not shortlisted for the Booker Prize again until 2005, when his novel The Sea was selected. The Sea was in contention alongside novels by Julian Barnes, Sebastian Barry, Kazuo Ishiguro, Ali Smith and Zadie Smith. The chairman of the judges was John Sutherland. Earlier that year Sutherland had written approvingly of Ian McEwan's novel Saturday. Banville had dismissed the work in The New York Review of Books and expressed his dismay that McEwan was increasingly showing "a disturbing tendency toward mellowness". Anne Haverty later called Banville's critique of Saturday "devastatingly effective". Sutherland sent a letter (signed "Lord Northcliffe Professor Emeritus") in response to Banville's review, in which he took Banville to task over his misreading of a game of squash in the novel. Banville issued a written reply with the opening line: "Summoned, one shuffles guiltily into the Department of Trivia", before begging Sutherland's pardon for his "sluggish comprehension" after managing to make his way through "all seventeen pages" of the game. He later admitted that, upon reading Sutherland's letter, he thought he could "kiss the Booker goodbye".

At the award ceremony, BBC Two's Kirsty Wark quizzed Financial Times arts editor Jan Dalley, the Independent on Sunday literary editor Suzi Feay and The Observer literary editor Robert McCrum. Banville, Barry and Ali Smith were dismissed outright and much of the discussion focused on Barnes, Ishiguro and Zadie Smith. In the end, the judges' vote was split between Banville and Ishiguro, with Rick Gekoski one of those favouring Banville. It fell to Sutherland to cast the winning vote; he did so in favour of Banville. Banville later recognised he had "not been the most popular person in London literary circles over the past half-year. And I think it was very large of Sutherland to cast the winning vote in my favour".

When the prize rules later changed to allow entries by American writers, Banville welcomed the idea, but he later expressed regret over the decision: "The prize was unique in its original form, but has lost that uniqueness. It is now just another prize among prizes. I am convinced the administrators should take the bold step of conceding the change was wrong, and revert".

=== Kafka Prize ===
In 2011, Banville received the Franz Kafka Prize. Marcel Reich-Ranicki and John Calder were members of the jury. Banville said he had been "wrestling with Kafka since I was an adolescent", said the bronze statuette trophy "will glare at me from the mantelpiece" and called the award "one of the ones one really wants to get. It's an old style prize and as an old codger it's perfect for me".

=== Nobel Prize in Literature hoax ===
On the day that the 2019 and 2018 Nobel Prize in Literature were to be announced, the Swedish Academy's number appeared on Banville's telephone. A man purporting to be Permanent Secretary of the Swedish Academy Mats Malm told him he had won and even read out the customary citation and asked whether he would prefer to be designated the 2018 or 2019 laureate. Banville was attending a physiotherapy appointment at the time and was lying face down on a couch when the call came, but had retained a mobile telephone nearby should he be contacted to give his view on an Irish winner. He informed his daughter; she called her father back while watching the live announcement at midday to tell him his name had not been mentioned. Banville telephoned everyone he had spoken to in the intervening period to tell them: "Don’t buy the champagne, stop throwing your hats in the air".

After the announcement, a voicemail to Banville from the man posing as Malm claimed the Swedish Academy had withdrawn his prize due to a disagreement. Banville felt sorry for the man purporting to be Malm: "He certainly sounded upset, he was a very good actor". But he then compared the speaker with a YouTube recording of the real Malm, at which point he realised that the speaker's voice was deeper than Malm's, and Malm had a better grasp of English.

Banville called upon the Swedish Academy to investigate the incident "because I don't think the hoax was aimed at me, I think it was aimed at damaging the Academy or one or two members of the Academy". He called himself "collateral damage". When informed of the incident, Malm said: "It sounds like a bad joke". Academy member Per Wästberg also thought it sounded like a joke. Banville later said of the experience: "I have the distinct impression that I wasn't the target of this really. I think he assumed that I would believe him and that I would make a big fuss in the newspapers and say this is another dispute within the jury. I think that's what he expected me to do, because that would embarrass the Academy. Specifically, he was talking about some woman on it who was deeply into gender studies. So I suspect it was her that was the target. It wasn't done for fun. It has the hallmarks of a man with a grudge. Not a grudge against me." Banville gave the Swedish Academy the recording to aid its investigation.

The Sunday Independent called Banville "as dignified and eloquent as ever in the face of a disappointment that made headlines around the world". He told The Observer: "There is some comedy in it and potential material: 'The man who nearly won the Nobel prize'". Irish media called the trick played on Banville "cruel" while English media called it "deceitful". He received numerous sympathetic emails and telephone calls and support from fellow writers.

== Works ==
Main works

- Long Lankin. London: Secker & Warburg, 1970; revised edition 1984
- Nightspawn. London: Secker & Warburg, 1971. ISBN 978-1852355593
- Birchwood. London: Secker & Warburg, 1973. ISBN 0-307-27912-X
- Revolutions Trilogy:
  - Doctor Copernicus. London: Secker & Warburg, 1976. ISBN 0-679-73799-5
  - Kepler. London: Secker & Warburg, 1981. ISBN 0-679-74370-7
  - The Newton Letter. London: Secker & Warburg, 1982. ISBN 1-567-92096-9
- Mefisto. London: Secker & Warburg, 1986. ISBN 1-567-92847-1
- Frames Trilogy
  - The Book of Evidence. London: Secker & Warburg, 1989. ISBN 0-436-03267-8
  - Ghosts. London: Secker & Warburg, 1993. ISBN 0-436-19991-2
  - Athena. London: Secker & Warburg, 1995. ISBN 2-221-09269-4
- The Untouchable. London: Picador, 1997. ISBN 0-679-76747-9
- Cleave Trilogy
  - Eclipse. London: Picador, 2000. ISBN 0-330-33933-8
  - Shroud. London: Picador, 2002. ISBN 978-0-330-48315-5
  - Ancient Light. London: Viking Penguin, 2012. ISBN 978-0-670-92061-7
- The Sea. London: Picador, 2005. ISBN 0-330-48328-5
- The Infinities. London: Picador, 2009. ISBN 978-0330450249
- The Blue Guitar. London: Viking Penguin, 2015. ISBN 978-0241970010
- Mrs Osmond. London: Penguin, 2017. ISBN 978-0241260173
- The Singularities. London: Knopf, 2022. ISBN 978-0525655176
- Quirke series
1. Christine Falls. London: Picador, 2006. Published as Benjamin Black. ISBN 978-0330445320
2. The Silver Swan. London: Picador, 2007. Published as Benjamin Black. ISBN 978-0805081534
3. Elegy for April. London: Mantle, 2010. Published as Benjamin Black. ISBN 978-1447263999
4. A Death in Summer. London: Mantle, 2011. Published as Benjamin Black. ISBN 978-0805090925
5. Vengeance. London: Mantle, 2012. Published as Benjamin Black. ISBN 978-1250024183
6. Holy Orders. London: Mantle, 2013. Published as Benjamin Black. ISBN 978-0805094404
7. Even the Dead. London: Viking, 2015. Published as Benjamin Black. ISBN 978-0241197356
8. April in Spain. London: Faber & Faber, 2021. Strafford & Quirke . Published as John Banville. ISBN 978-1335471406
9. The Lock-up. London: Faber & Faber, 2023. Strafford & Quirke . Published as John Banville. ISBN 978-0571370979
10. The Drowned. London: Faber & Faber, 2024. Toronto, Ontario, Canada: Hanover Square Press, 2024. Strafford & Quirke . Published as John Banville. ISBN 978-0571370832
- St John Strafford series
1. Snow. London: Faber & Faber, 2020. Published as John Banville. ISBN 978-1335230003
2. The Secret Guests. London: Penguin, 2020. Published as B. W. Black. ISBN 978-0241305317

Other works

- The Lemur. London: Picador, 2008. Published as Benjamin Black. ISBN 978-0571399673
- The Black-Eyed Blonde. New York: Henry Holt, 2014 (a Philip Marlowe novel). Published as Benjamin Black. ISBN 978-0805098143
- Prague Nights. London: Penguin, 2017. (published in the U.S. as Wolf on a String). Published as Benjamin Black. ISBN 978-0241197387
- Venetian Vespers. Knopf. October 2025. Published as John Banville. ISBN 978-0593801161

== See also ==
- Roman à clef
