= The Book of Evidence =

1989 novel by John Banville

- Cover of the first edition
- Author: John Banville
- Language: English
- Publisher: Secker & Warburg
- Publication date: 1989
- Publication place: Ireland
- Media type: Print (Hardcover & Paperback)
- Pages: 224 pp (hardcover)
- ISBN: 0-436-03267-8
- OCLC: 45363983
- Dewey Decimal: 823/.914 21
- LC Class: PR6052.A57 B36 2001
- Followed by: Ghosts

The Book of Evidence is a 1989 novel by John Banville. Many of the characters in The Book of Evidence appear in the 1993 sequel Ghosts.

The book is narrated by Freddie Montgomery, a 38-year-old scientist who murders a servant girl during an attempt to steal a painting from a neighbour. Freddie is an aimless drifter, and though he is a perceptive observer of himself and his surroundings, he is largely amoral.

== Plot ==
Freddie Montgomery is the unreliable narrator who tells his life story and recounts the events leading up to his arrest for the murder of a servant girl in one of Ireland's "big houses". A cultured but louche Anglo-Irish scientist who has been living abroad for many years, Freddie returns to his ancestral home seeking money after falling foul of a gangster in the Mediterranean. Shocked to discover that his mother has sold the family's collection of paintings, Freddie attempts to recover them. This leads to a tragic series of events culminating in Freddie's killing of a maid while stealing a painting. On the run, he hides out in the house of Charlie, an old family friend and a man of some influence, before being arrested and interrogated. The novel ends as Freddie sits in jail and has the first feelings of remorse for the girl's death while casting doubt on the truth of what he has recounted.

Throughout his loquacious account, the narrator sporadically inserts complex and obscure words before admitting in one of the later chapters to having a dictionary beside him in his cell from which he is extracting these gems that embellish his prose.

== Background ==
The central events of the murder and subsequent flight are based on the 1982 case of Malcolm Edward MacArthur, who killed a young nurse in Dublin during the course of stealing her car. MacArthur, a well-known eccentric in the city's social circles, took refuge (as a guest) at the home of Patrick Connolly, then the Irish Attorney General, where he was ultimately arrested. A serious effort was made to prevent the relationship between Connolly and MacArthur from becoming public. Taoiseach Charles Haughey described the incidents and MacArthur's taking shelter at Connolly's as "a bizarre happening, an unprecedented situation, a grotesque situation, an almost unbelievable mischance". The acronym GUBU (grotesque, unbelievable, bizarre and unprecedented) was coined by Conor Cruise O'Brien and later applied to reflect the entirety of Haughey's March–December 1982 government, a government marred by constant turmoil.

In December 2012, Banville was being interviewed by Fintan O'Toole at an evening dedicated to the essayist Hubert Butler in Trinity College Dublin. MacArthur, recently released from prison, was in the audience. Banville left as soon as the interview was done; MacArthur attended the drinks reception.

== Reception ==
In reviewing the book, Publishers Weekly compared Banville's writing to that of Albert Camus and Fyodor Dostoevsky. The writing style continues Banville's attempt to give his prose "the kind of denseness and thickness that poetry has".

Banville confirmed the influence of The Stranger, of Notes From Underground, and also of Lolita. Because he feared that the novel would be judged "hackneyed", he said he tried to make Freddie as original as possible "through style". "I mean, it is a hackneyed old story, but there is Freddie's voice and Freddie's style".

== Awards ==
The Book of Evidence won the Guinness Peat Aviation Literary Award in 1989 and was shortlisted for the Booker Prize.

The awarding of the GPA Award was mired by controversy. Graham Greene was part of the jury, though the award organisers did not notice that he had included a clause in his contract that allowed him to overrule the decision of the other jury members. Consequently, when the jury chose The Book of Evidence as the winner, Greene chose to ignore this and picked The Broken Commandment by Vincent McDonnell as the winner. Eventually, through the intervention of Tony Ryan, a compromise was reached whereby Banville was awarded the £50,000 main prize while Guinness Peat Aviation provided an additional sum of £25,000 to be awarded to Vincent McDonnell, as a specially created GPA First Fiction Award. Banville later described the incident as "grubby" and said that Greene had behaved quite badly in the awarding of the prize.

Colm Tóibín has stated that the book ought to have won Banville the Booker Prize.
