= Love Again (2003 film) =

2003 film directed by Susanna White

- Written by: Richard Cottan
- Directed by: Susanna White
- Starring: Hugh Bonneville; Tara Fitzgerald; Amanda Root; Lorraine Ashbourne; Eileen Atkins
- Country of origin: United Kingdom
- Original language: English

Production
- Producer: Susan B. Flanagan; Simon Heath
- Cinematography: Mike Eley
- Editor: Jason Krasucki
- Running time: 75 minutes
- Production company: BBC

Original release
- Network: BBC2
- Release: 26 July 2003

Love Again is a 2003 British television drama film directed by Susanna White, starring Hugh Bonneville, Tara Fitzgerald, Amanda Root, Lorraine Ashbourne and Eileen Atkins. It is about the poet Philip Larkin, his life as a librarian at the University of Hull from 1955 to 1985, and his relationships with three women and his mother. It premiered on BBC2 on 26 July 2003.

The Irish Independent wrote that "if this were fiction, there'd be no point and very little drama", but with Larkin as the main character, the film becomes "both enthralling and illuminating".

== Cast ==
- Hugh Bonneville as Philip Larkin
- Tara Fitzgerald as Monica Jones
- Amanda Root as Maeve Brennan
- Lorraine Ashbourne as Betty Mackereth
- Eileen Atkins as Eva Larkin
- Sarah Smart as Jean Hartley
- Ben Miles as George Hartley
- Brian Pettifer as Arthur Wood
- David Sibley as Interview Chairman
- Kevin Moore as Radio Interviewer
- Julia Munrow as The Queen
