= The North Ship =

Collection of poems by Philip Larkin

- First edition
- Author: Philip Larkin
- Language: English
- Genre: Poetry
- Publisher: Fortune Press
- Publication place: United Kingdom
- English publication date: 1945
- Followed by: The Less Deceived

The North Ship is the debut collection of poems by Philip Larkin (1922–1985), published in 1945 by Reginald A. Caton's Fortune Press. Caton did not pay his writers and expected them to buy a certain number of copies themselves. A similar arrangement had been used in 1934 by Dylan Thomas for his first collection.

Some of the poems were composed while Larkin was an undergraduate at the University of Oxford, but the bulk were written in the period 1943 to 1944 when he was running the public library in Wellington, Shropshire, and writing his second novel A Girl in Winter.

The volume was published again, in 1966, by Faber and Faber Limited. In the 1945 version there are 31 items, numbered with Roman numerals. The last of these, "The North Ship" is a set of five poems tracking a ship's northward progress. Of the 30 single poems, only seven have titles. In the 1966 reissue an extra poem, "Waiting for breakfast, while she brushed her hair" was added at the end. This edition is still in print.

The North Ship constitutes the first part of the 2003 edition of Larkin's Collected Poems.

== Content ==
The book contains 32 poems:

- Ellipsis (...) indicates first line of an untitled poem

Sequence	Poem title or first line	
I	All catches alight...	
II	This was your place of birth, this daytime palace...	
III	The moon is full tonight...	
IV	Dawn	
V	Conscript	
VI	Kick up the fire, and let the flames break loose...	
VII	The horns of the morning...	
VIII	Winter	
IX	Climbing the hill within the deafening wind...	
X	Within the dream you said...	
XI	Night-Music	
XII	Like the train's beat...	
XIII	I put my mouth...	
XIV	Nursery Tale	
XV	The Dancer	
XVI	The bottle is drunk out by one...	
XVII	To write one song, I said...	
XVIII	If grief could burn out...	
XIX	Ugly Sister	
XX	I see a girl dragged by the wrists...	
XXI	I dreamed of an out-thrust arm of land...	
XXII	One man walking a deserted platform...	
XXIII	If hands could free you, heart...	
XXIV	Love, we must part now: do not let it be...	
XXV	Morning has spread again...	
XXVI	This is the first thing...	
XXVII	Heaviest of flowers, the head...	
XXVIII	Is it for now or for always...	
XXIX	Pour away that youth...	
XXX	So through that unripe day you bore your head...	
XXXI	The North Ship	Legend; Songs 65° N 70° N Fortunetelling; 75° N Blizzard; Above 80° N
XXXII	Waiting for breakfast, while she brushed her hair...	

== See also ==
- List of poems by Philip Larkin – a complete list of all the known poems, both published and unpublished, and their date of composition
