= Jean Hartley =

English autobiographer and publisher

- Born: Jean Holland; 27 April 1933; Hull, Yorkshire, England
- Died: 18 July 2011 (aged 78); Hull, Yorkshire, England
- Education: University of Hull
- Occupations: Autobiographer; Publisher
- Years active: 1950s–2010
- Spouse: George Hartley (m. 1953–1974)
- Children: 2

Jean Hartley (née Holland; 27 April 1933 – 18 July 2011) was an English autobiographer and publisher. She and her husband George Hartley co-founded the publication company Marvell Press in 1954, which published volumes of poetry. They also founded the record company Listen Records. After Hartley separated from her husband and left Marvell Press, she earned degrees in English Literature and Victorian Studies from the University of Hull in the early 1970s. She taught English at her former secondary school and lectured at the Hull College of Further Education. In 1995, Hartley was made vice-chairman of the Philip Larkin Society to promote the life and works of her friend and poet Philip Larkin. She was on the steering committee of the Larkin 25 committee in 2010. The Hull History Centre holds a collection of items on Hartley's life and career.

== Early life ==
Hartley was born at Ivy Terrace, Constable Street, Hull, Yorkshire on 27 April 1933, to a poor working-class family. Her father was the iron foundry labourer William Manclin Holland and her mother was the domestic service worker Olive Holland, née Simpson. Hartley was raised in Hull's fishing community on Hessle Road, where she did library errands for her mother. She was evacuated to a nearby Lincolnshire village during the Second World War and billeted with the local major; she felt unhappy because of "haughty upper-class voices and the one-eyed major and his tall, be-jodhpured sons strutted about carrying riding-crops, but the maid was kind.

At age 14, Hartley was awarded a scholarship to go to Thoresby High School in Hull, studying "commercial" as one of three courses offered to her. After Hartley was compelled to find work, she dropped out of her education after one year to become a shorthand typist at a nominal wage with a small accountancy firm, ignoring advice from her mother to "settle down". She found extra inspiration from classes of the Workers' Educational Association of Richard Hoggart, describing herself in her teenage years as "insufferable working-class would-be intellectual: “What's that you're reading Jean?” “It's T S Eliot's The Waste Land, but you wouldn't understand it." Hartley was sent to a home for unmarried mothers after she gave birth to her first child in late 1951 when she was aged 17. Upon her return to Hull, she courted the art student George Hartley, whom she married on 24 August 1953. She had a daughter with him.

== Career ==
After purchasing some literary magazines, Hartley's husband decided to establish a Hull-based quarterly review poetry magazine called Listen, with the name coming from Hartley after Poetry Hull was rejected for sounding " too provincial". She was made the magazine's co-editor and business manager, which gained national readership and featured contributions from The Movement poets such as Philip Larkin in its second edition. Determined to publish poetry volumes, Hartley and her husband began Marvell Press in 1954, partly named after the poet Andrew Marvell, and because "it would be a bloody marvel if we managed to publish a book." Larkin, whom she became lifelong friends with, was invited to be their first author and the book, The Less Deceived, was published in November 1958. Due to the company lacking the necessary finances, subscriptions were advertised to pay for publication expenses.

Hartley went on to publish volumes on the works of Anthony Thwaite, Donald Davie and W. D. Snodgrass, and ventured into sound recording with the publication of The Less Deceived in 1959 and The Whitsun Weddings six years later (the book appeared under the imprint label Faber and Faber in 1964). In 1965, Hartley was impatient over how Larkin's poems were read by over-elocuted actors on the BBC Third Programme that she and her husband formed the record company Listen Records.

The marriage between her and her husband so strained that by mid-1968, they separated, taking the two children with her; they were divorced in 1974. Hartley left Marvell Press the same year, to enroll on a course in English Literature at the University of Hull; Larkin set-up a grant scheme for her to live on, and wrote a reference for her entry into the university. She graduated with a Bachelor of Arts degree in 1971. Soon after graduation, Hartley was accepted to read a Bachelor of Philosophy course in Victorian Studies. She graduated in 1972, and took up a job teaching English at the renamed Amy Johnson School. From 1974 to 1991, Hartley lectured at the Hull College of Further Education.

== Later life and death ==
She published her autobiography, Philip Larkin, the Marvell Press, and Me, in 1989, and wrote the BBC Radio 4 programme The Wayward Girls that was broadcast on 4 November 1992, which discusses single parenthood in Hull during the 1950s. Hartley promoted the poet's Frank Redpath and the poetry magazine editor Ted Tarling artistic ambitions. She was annoyed at the misportrayal of Larkin in the 1993 Andrew Motion biography Philip Larkin: a Writer's Life. She completed the topographical guide Philip Larkin's Hull and East Yorkshire in 1995, and was made vice-chairman of the Philip Larkin Society in the same year, editing the society's journal About Larkin. In 2002, Hartley was a key figure in encouraging Maeve Brennan to author the book The Philip Larkin I Knew.

Eight years later, David Pattinson wrote the play Wrong Beginnings about her life. Hartley was on the steering committee of the Larkin 25 programme in 2010, which celebrated the life and works of Larkin on the 25th anniversary of his death with various celebrations in Hull. This included substantial planning to the Larkin Trail taking in the places where Larkin lived and worked. She enjoyed pottery and graphic art, with her work exhibited in Hull and at Beningbrough Hall. She was a socialist and agnostic. In January 2011, Hartley received an honorary Doctor of Letters degree by the University of Hull. She was cared at home by her daughters and granddaughter in her final years, and died on 18 July 2011, from heart failure at Victoria Avenue, Hull. Following a humanist ceremony, Hartley was buried in Hull Western Cemetery.

== Legacy ==
The Hull History Centre hold a collection of papers relating to the life and works of Hartley from 1954 to 2011. They include her manuscripts, personal letters and correspondence to her friends, poets and Marvell Press, and items relating to her career.
