= Winifred Dawson =

English librarian and biographer

Winifred Dawson (born Winifred Arnott; 5 February 1929 — 22 August 2014) was an English librarian, biographer and close friend of Philip Larkin.

== Biography ==
Winifred Dawson was born in Stourbridge, Worcestershire, and spent her early life in North East England. Her parents were Samuel Clauson Arnott, an electrical engineer, and Bertha Arnott. At the start of the Second World War she was evacuated to Lisburn in Northern Ireland, where she lived with her father's relations until the German bombing of Belfast, when she was evacuated to a Huguenot castle on the coast of the Irish Sea.

She studied English at Queen's University Belfast, graduating in 1949. She worked as a cataloguer in Queen's Great Library, and completed postgraduate studies at Birkbeck College in London.

In 1954, she married Geoffrey Bradshaw, who worked for the Ministry of Defence in London, and the couple had three children. Their marriage ended in divorce in 1976. Dawson remarried in 1981 to Grant Dawson.

In 2014, she self-published the biography The Porter's Daughter, the life of Amy Audrey Locke. She came across the story of historian Amy Audrey Locke whilst working as a librarian at St Swithun's school in Winchester.

She was a committed member of the Larkin Society and enjoyed travel, hill walking, and singing in choirs.

Dawson died in 2014 from a stroke, aged 85.

=== Friendship with Philip Larkin ===
Dawson was a close friend of the poet Philip Larkin. The relationship between them has been described as a 'romantic friendship'. They met at Queen's University Belfast in the 1950s, where Dawson worked as a library assistant and Larkin as a librarian.

Dawson was the inspiration and subject of several of Philip Larkin's poems, including Lines on a Young Lady's Photograph Album; Latest Face; Maiden Name; He Hears That His Beloved Has Become Engaged; and Long Roots Moor Summer to Our Side of Earth.

Dawson read one of Larkin's poems at the unveiling of the Larkin plaque at King's Cross station in London. She had friendships with other women connected to Larkin, including Maeve Brennan, Jean Hartley, and Larkin's former fiancée Ruth Siverns.

In the Selected Letters of Philip Larkin, 26 are to Dawson, many of which date from her time studying for a postgraduate diploma in librarianship in London. Philip Larkin's letters to Dawson are held at the Bodleian Library, University of Oxford. Dawson's letters to Larkin, along with a photograph album that inspired Larkin's poem Lines on a Young Lady's Photograph Album, are held at Hull History Centre.
