= Collected Poems (Larkin) =

Poetry book by Philip Larkin

- First edition (1988)
- Author: Philip Larkin
- Language: English
- Genre: Poetry
- Publisher: Faber and Faber
- Publication date: 1988, 2003
- Publication place: United Kingdom
- Pages: 330 / 240
- ISBN: 978-0-571-21654-3
- OCLC: 51804524

Collected Poems is the title of a posthumous collection of Philip Larkin's poetry edited by Anthony Thwaite and published by Faber and Faber. He released two notably different editions in 1988 and 2003, the first of which also includes previously unpublished work. Both editions include the contents of Larkin's collections The North Ship, The Less Deceived, The Whitsun Weddings and High Windows, plus other material.

== Original edition (1988) ==
For the 1988 edition, editor Anthony Thwaite included all of Philip Larkin's published poetry as well as unpublished and incomplete work. Thwaite divided the book into two sections: what he considered the mature (post war) poetry, 1946 - 1983, and juvenilia, 1938 - 1945. Larkin's three most popular and celebrated collections (The Less Deceived, The Whitsun Weddings, and High Windows) fall in the first part of the book, but account for just 85 poems, with 87 poems uncollected (or appearing only in the privately printed XX Poems) of which 61 were previously unpublished, a handful of which were clearly unfinished. This section also included Larkin's own unpublished second collection In the Grip of Light).

Controversially Larkin's first collection 'The North Ship' (32 poems) fell in the latter section along with other poems the author wrote at University, or indeed school, a total of 38 uncollected pieces, 22 unpublished from 1938 to 1945. The published material here appearing in both public publications (The Listener, Poetry from Oxford in Wartime) and privately circulated college and university magazines. The collected poems then doubled the stock of Larkin poems in print, publishing a third for the very first time.

Thwaite organized the poems in chronological order, as is often the case in a 'complete poems' collection. Meaning that poems from Larkin's four collections, his uncollected poems, and his unpublished work are interspersed throughout according to their date of composition. The site of original publication or collection was noted at the foot of each poem, and an appendix listed the contents and order of Larkin's intended original collections, published, unpublished and private, but the perceived loss of identity of these beloved collections and their running orders was criticised by Larkin fans, with some critics considering the arrangement eccentric and overly academic. The book was published in hardback in the UK by Faber and the Marvell Press and in the US by Farrar, Straus and Giroux; paperback editions, with some corrections and revisions were published in 1990. All running to several printings.

== Shortened Collected Poems (2003) ==
In 2003, Thwaite prepared a new edition with a different arrangement. He also corrected typos and added back published poem titles which Larkin had later reconsidered. It does not contain the vast volume of unpublished and incomplete work included in the 1988 edition, and orders the published poems in Larkin's preferred arrangement according to his four published collections, omitting entirely his unpublished 1947 collection. Additionally, it includes two appendices containing most of the other poems Larkin published but did not include in his four main collections.

== Appendices ==
The 2003 edition includes Larkin's uncollected poems in two appendices. The first appendix contains poems published in magazines and journals before 1972, but not subsequently collected by Larkin. The contents of the privately printed XX Poems (1951) are deemed to be in this category.

Appendix I: Uncollected Poems 1940–1972

[Ellipsis (...) indicates first line of an untitled poem]

- Ultimatum
- Story
- A Writer
- May Weather
- Observation
- Disintegration
- Mythological Introduction
- A Stone Church Damaged by a Bomb
- Femmes Damnées
- Plymouth
- Portrait
- The Dedicated
- Modesties
- Fiction and the Reading Public
- Oils (originally the first part of "Two Portraits of Sex")
- Who called love conquering...
- Since the majority of me...
- Arrival
- Tops
- Success Story
- Continuing to Live
- Pigeons
- Breadfruit
- Love
- When the Russian tanks roll westward...
- How
- Heads in the Women's Ward

Appendix II: Uncollected Poems 1974–1984

The second appendix contains those poems published after High Windows, Larkin's final volume.

- The Life with a Hole in it
- Bridge for the Living
- Aubade
- 1952-1977
- New eyes each year...
- The Mower
- Dear CHARLES, My Muse, asleep or dead...
- By day, a lifted study-storehouse...
- Party Politics

== See also ==
- List of poems by Philip Larkin
