= Church going =

Church going may refer to:

- Church attendance
- "Church Going", a poem by Philip Larkin, from his 1955 collectionThe Less Deceived
- Church Going (film), a 2007 film by Ashley Inglis and Russell Inglis, supported by the UK Film Council Completion Fund
