= Selected Letters of Philip Larkin, 1940–1985 =

1992 correspondence collection

- First edition
- Author: Philip Larkin, edited by Anthony Thwaite
- Genre: Correspondence
- Publisher: Faber and Faber, London
- Publication date: 1 January 1992
- Publication place: England
- Media type: Print (Hardback)
- Pages: 791 pages
- ISBN: 0-571-17048-X

The Selected Letters of Philip Larkin, 1940–1985 is a volume of Philip Larkin's personal correspondence, compiled by Anthony Thwaite, one of Larkin's literary executors, and published in 1992 by Faber and Faber, seven years after Larkin's death. It was followed a year later by Philip Larkin: A Writer's Life, Larkin's official biography, written by Andrew Motion, Larkin's other literary executor.

A further volume, of Larkin's correspondence with Monica Jones, was published in 2010.

== List of recipients included in the selection ==
- Kingsley Amis
- John Betjeman
- Robert Conquest
- Colin Gunner
- Monica Jones
- Eva Larkin
- Charles Monteith
- Bruce Montgomery
- Barbara Pym

== See also ==
- The Letters of Kingsley Amis
