= High Windows (poem) =

Poem by Philip Larkin

High Windows is the title poem from Philip Larkin´s 1974 collection of the same name. In the poem, high windows are mentioned after a funeral has been evoked. The poem ends

Rather than words comes the thought of high windows;
The sun-comprehending glass,
And beyond it, the deep blue air, that shows
Nothing, and is nowhere, and is endless.

The location of the windows is not indicated, but for some readers church windows are implied. On the other hand, the poet is widely believed to have been inspired by what he saw from the windows of his flat at 32 Pearson Park, Hull.

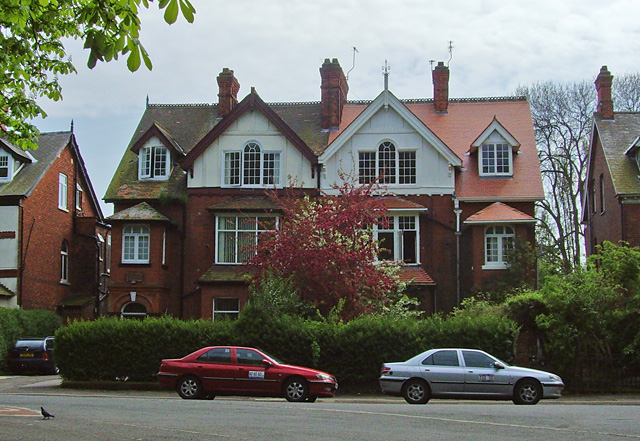
The poet Philip Larkin lived in the top flat of No. 32 (on the right)

The narrator of the poem sees a young couple, a vision of “paradise” which takes the form of a relationship where sex does not incur the risk of pregnancy.

The poem was written in the 1960s when he was living in the top flat at No. 32, his home for 18 years from 1956. Pearson Park is featured in a Philip Larkin Trail, which frames sites in Hull connected to the poet. The building, which retains its late-19th-century appearance, has been granted grade II listed status in part for its literary connection.
