= Larkin at Sixty =

1982 anthology of Philip Larkin

- First edition
- Editor: Anthony Thwaite
- Author: Philip Larkin
- Publisher: Faber and Faber
- Publication date: 1982

Larkin at Sixty (1982) is a collection of original essays and poems published to celebrate the sixtieth birthday of the English poet Philip Larkin. It was edited and introduced by Anthony Thwaite and published by Larkin's publishers, Faber and Faber. A poetic dramatisation of the launch of the book was written by Russell Davies.

== Contents ==
Thwaite's introduction reveals that there were originally to be twenty-three contributors, but four ("An American, a Russian, a Pakistani and a woman") dropped out for various reasons. As well as the introduction, the book contains the following:

- Noel Hughes (a school-friend of Larkin): The Young Mr Larkin
- Kingsley Amis: Oxford and After
- Robert Conquest: A Proper Sport
- Charles Monteith (of Faber and Faber): Publishing Larkin
- B. C. Bloomfield (Larkin's bibliographer): Larkin the Librarian
- Douglas Dunn: Memoirs of the Brynmor Jones Library
- Harry Chambers (a Larkin fan): Meeting Philip Larkin
- Andrew Motion: On the Plain of Holderness
- Alan Bennett: Instead of a Present
- Donald Mitchell: Larkin's Music
- John Gross: The Anthologist (on The Oxford Book of Twentieth Century English Verse)
- George Hartley (publisher of The Less Deceived): Nothing To Be Said
- Clive James: On His Wit
- Alan Brownjohn: Novels into Poems
- Christopher Ricks: Like Something Almost Being Said
- Seamus Heaney: The Main of Light
- Peter Porter: Going to Parties (a poem)
- John Betjeman: Archibald (a poem)
- Gavin Ewart: An Old Larkinian (a poem)
- Notes on contributors
