= Larkin 25 =

Arts festival in England

Larkin 25 – Arts Festival
- Dates: 14 June to 2 December 2010
- Locations: Hull and East Riding of Yorkshire

Larkin 25 was an arts festival and cultural event in Kingston upon Hull, England, organised to mark the 25th anniversary of the death of the poet and University of Hull librarian, Philip Larkin. The festival was launched at Hull Truck Theatre on 14 June 2010 and concluded on 2 December 2010, the twenty-fifth anniversary of the poet's death, with the unveiling of a statue in his likeness at Hull Paragon Interchange.

== Philip Larkin ==
Larkin was born in Coventry and lived in Hull while he was head librarian at the Brynmor Jones Library from 1955 until his death in 1985. Larkin was a jazz critic for The Daily Telegraph between 1961 and 1971. He lived for the greater part of his time in Hull in a flat at 32 Pearson Park near the university. In the 1970s he bought a house at Newland Park.

== Festival ==
The Larkin 25 festival coincided with Hull's annual literature festival, 'Humber Mouth', and included walking tours, art and photography exhibitions, musical events and an exhibition of Larkin memorabilia. A compilation of Larkin's favourite jazz recordings titled "Larkin's Jazz" was released in conjunction with the festival. In June, Sir Tom Courtenay visited the University of Hull to perform a one-man play, Larkin Revisited, and repeated the performance at Hull Truck Theatre in November 2010. A Hull city bus was named "Philip Larkin" by Sir Andrew Motion in honour of the poet. On 7 October 2010, "Poetry on the Buses" was launched in Hull and East Yorkshire to coincide with National Poetry Day. Forty of Larkin's poems were displayed on East Yorkshire Motor Services vehicles until the end of the festival in December 2010.

=== Larkin with Toads ===
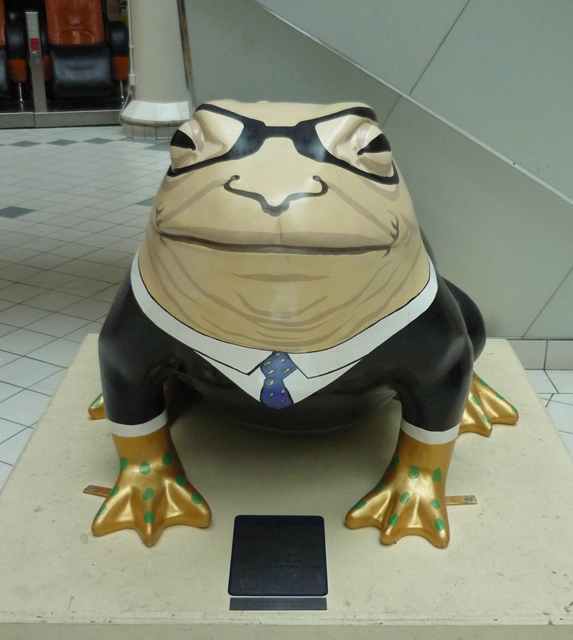
Number 10: representation of Larkin as a toad, Princes Quay Shopping Centre, Kingston upon Hull

The centrepiece of the festival was a public art display and trail, "Larkin with Toads", launched in the city centre on Saturday 17 July. It consisted of 40 fibre-glass toad sculptures, each painted with a unique design created by artists and local people inspired by Larkin's poems about working life, Toads and Toads Revisited. Examples of the designs included a "Larkin toad", a "Punk toad", a "Tiger Toad" (based on the mascot of Hull City A.F.C.) and a "Typographical toad" adorned with Larkin's poetry. The toads were auctioned for charity at the end of the event, though there were calls to make them a permanent feature. Most of the sculptures have been removed and transported to their new owners but some remained in situ after the sale. On 26 September 2010 it was reported that the toads had been auctioned for £60,000 though some had hoped their popularity could have made them a permanent feature.

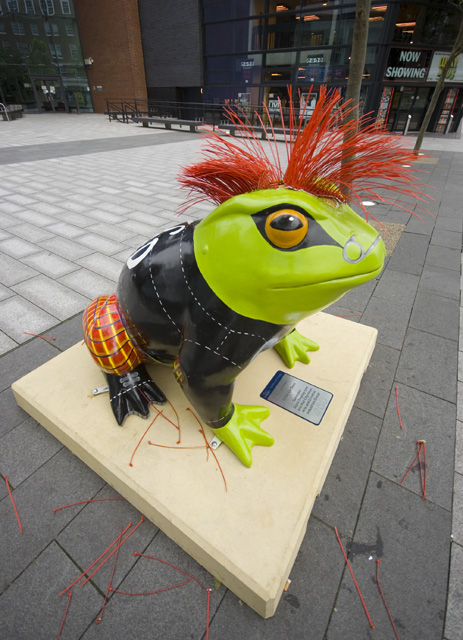
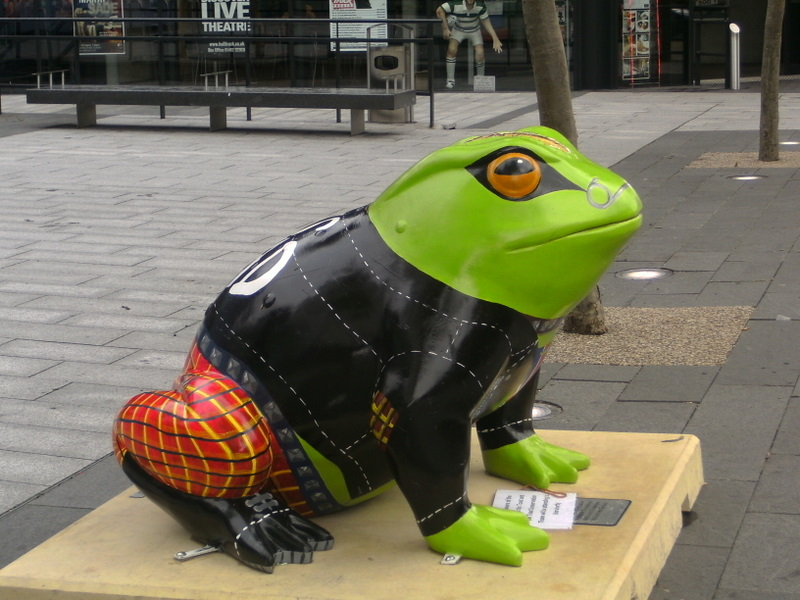
The "punk toad" before and after being vandalised.

The Larkin toad trail covered many locations in the city centre, such as Hull Paragon Interchange, Hull Truck Theatre, the Museums Quarter and The Deep. There were toads in the St Stephen's, Princes Quay and Prospect shopping centres. Other toads were located in outlying areas, such as The Avenues and the university, with some beyond Hull's boundaries in areas of the East Riding of Yorkshire familiar to Larkin, including one in Beverley.

By late July 2010 the Hull Daily Mail reported that over 30,000 guides had been distributed and a marketing company was employed to manage the high level of public interest.

During the festival some Larkin toads were vandalised and stolen. A 'punk toad' near Hull Truck Theatre had its mohican hair ripped off, and an 'astronaut toad' outside the railway station was damaged. The organisers repaired the damage and made the toads more resilient to vandalism. The Magenta Toad was stolen from Melton. It was later found dumped by the A63 and recovered for repair.

A report after the event has suggested that the toad trail brought about £1 million in to the local economy.

=== Philip Larkin statue ===
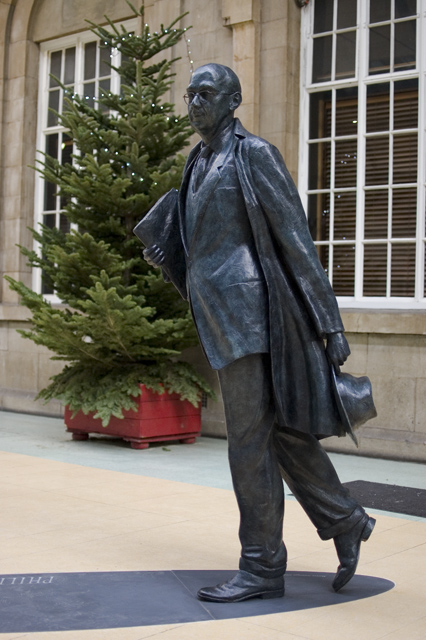
Bronze Statue of Philip Larkin, by sculptor Martin Jennings, at Hull Paragon Interchange

On the 25th anniversary of his Larkin's death, Thursday 2 December 2010, the festival concluded with the unveiling of a life-size bronze statue at Hull Paragon Interchange by the Lord Mayor. Funding for the £100,000 statue was raised during the festival. The unveiling was accompanied by Nathaniel Seaman's Fanfare for Larkin, specially composed to mark the occasion.

Martin Jennings produced the sculpture using photographs from the University of Hull's Larkin Research Centre and researched his poems and biography to "get a sense of the man." He worked on the maquette for the finished casting at his studio in Coombe, Oxfordshire. Professor James Booth of the Philip Larkin Society described the statue as, "magnificent, poetic, refined, exactly the Larkin I'm familiar with." The statue was gifted to the people of Hull by the Philip Larkin Society. On 2 December 2011, a year since the original unveiling ceremony, five additional slate roundels containing inscriptions of Larkin's poems were installed in the floor space around the statue. The sculpture has become a popular subject for photography at the Interchange. In December 2012 a memorial bench was installed around a pillar near the statue.

=== Reception ===
The Daily Telegraph opined that the reclusive Larkin would be unimpressed by the event and Stephen McClarence in The Times observed that "the city is celebrating this year's 25th anniversary of his death in fine style." Plans for the sculpture trail were initially criticised because of concerns about expenditure during the late-2000s recession but the event went ahead. Artists were invited to design a toad and sponsorship invited. When the toads were displayed the Hull Daily Mail reported that opinion had shifted in favour of the sculptures and an online poll recorded a majority of readers favouring the event. In December 2010 the Hull Daily Mail described the exhibition as "hugely successful".
