= A Girl in Winter =

1947 novel by Philip Larkin

First edition (UK)

A Girl in Winter is a novel by Philip Larkin, first published in 1947 by Faber and Faber. It was published in the USA in 1962 by St Martin's Press.

Larkin stated that he had originally intended to write further novels, but he published no more fiction after A Girl in Winter, possibly because of a shortage of material on which to draw for inspiration. John Osborne called it "the most underestimated work in the Larkin canon" and "a harbinger of greatness".

== Plot ==
The main character in the novel (the "girl" of the title) is Katherine Lind, a library assistant. The book has three parts, with parts one and three taking place in an unnamed English town on a single day in the early 1940s. Katherine leaves work to escort a colleague who has been taken ill, an incident that results in a trip to the dentist and a chemist where the colleague's bag is taken in error for another person's bag. Part two, the lengthiest section, is set in a summer in the 1930s when Katherine first visited England from her native Germany in order to stay with her pen pal, Robin Fennel, his sister Jane, and their parents, Mr and Mrs Fennel. In part three of the novel, Katherine receives a visit from Robin, who is now in the army, and he spends the night with her.

== Adaptation ==
The book was adapted for radio and broadcast on BBC Radio Four in 2013, along with an adaptation of Larkin's first novel, Jill (1946).
