= Anthony Thwaite =

British poet and critic (1930-2021)

Anthony Simon Thwaite OBE (23 June 1930 – 22 April 2021) was an English poet and critic, widely known as the editor of his friend Philip Larkin's collected poems and letters.

== Early years and education ==
Born in Chester, England, to Yorkshire parents, Thwaite at the age of 10 crossed the Atlantic alone to spend the war years in and around Washington D.C., with an aunt and uncle. On D-Day in 1944 he was on his way home. At Kingswood School, Bath, a teacher, praising his Anglo-Saxon type riddles, encouraged him to think he was a poet. National Service near Leptis Magna in Libya, encouraged him further, both as a poet and as an amateur archaeologist (he eventually became a Fellow of the Society of Antiquaries).

Thwaite came to early prominence as a poet. While still an undergraduate at Christ Church, Oxford, he published a pamphlet with the Fantasy Press in a series that included the early work of Larkin, Kingsley Amis and Elizabeth Jennings. Poems began to appear in The Listener, the New Statesman and The Times Literary Supplement, and with his first book reviews and a series of undergraduate articles, in The Spectator. At Oxford, he edited the weekly magazine Isis, became president of the Poetry Society and met his wife, Ann Thwaite, who became a biographer. In 1955, they went by ship to teach in Japan for two years, where their first child was born and Thwaite's first book of poems was published, a tribute from his postgraduate students at the University of Tokyo. It was while he was there that the Marvell Press published Larkin's The Less Deceived and accepted the manuscript of his own Home Truths.

== Career ==
Thwaite returned to take up a graduate traineeship at the BBC. He had eight years there, first as a radio producer (sharing at one stage an office with Louis MacNeice), then as Literary Editor of The Listener. In 1965, he took two years unpaid leave to return to North Africa, this time as assistant professor at the University of Libya in Benghazi and with his wife and four daughters. A brief return to the BBC in 1967 ended when Thwaite was invited to be Literary Editor of the New Statesman, where his assistants were successively Claire Tomalin and James Fenton. In 1968 he won the Richard Hillary Memorial Prize for The Stones of Emptiness, a collection of poems written during these years. His subsequent career has included the following positions: Henfield Writing Fellow at the University of East Anglia, Visiting Professor at Kuwait University, Japan Foundation Fellowship at the University of Tokyo (1985–1986), co-editor of Encounter magazine (1973–1985), Poet-in-Residence at Vanderbilt University, Nashville, Tennessee. He also spent many years as an editor of the Poetry list at Secker and Warburg, and later as an editorial director of André Deutsch.

Thwaite judged many prizes and literary competitions, sat on literature advisory committees (the Arts Council and British Council), presented numerous radio programmes and 'Writers World' on BBC2. In 1986 he was chairman of the Booker Prize judges. He edited selections (Longfellow, R. S. Thomas, Skelton), and anthologies, including Six Centuries of Verse, based on the Thames Television/Channel Four 16-part series with his narration spoken by the actor John Gielgud. The English Poets, from Chaucer to Edward Thomas (1974) was based on a radio series he presented with his friend the Australian poet, Peter Porter.

Thwaite was a regular book reviewer for The Observer and later for The Sunday Telegraph and The Guardian. He wrote an introduction to contemporary English poetry, which went into many editions and prepared two travelling exhibitions for the British Council. He himself travelled all over the world, reading his own poems and talking about other people's, from New Zealand to Argentina and Baghdad to Texas. He represented 'Literature' at British Week in Novosibirsk in Siberia and toured China with Malcolm Bradbury at the invitation of their governments. He has returned to Japan many times; the Penguin Book of Japanese Verse, which he edited with Geoffrey Bownas, is still in print. The National Portrait Gallery, London, has three photographic portraits of Thwaite in its collection, including a double portrait with his wife, Ann.

Thwaite had two honorary doctorates, from University of Hull and from the University of East Anglia, near where he lived with his wife for 45 years. He was a Fellow of the Royal Society of Literature and was appointed an OBE for services to poetry in the 1990 New Year Honours. His Late Poems and Going Out appeared after the Collected Poems. At the launch of his last (20th) book of poems, when he was 85, the distinguished audience (including Alan Hollinghurst, David Lodge, P. J. Kavanagh and Penelope Lively) gave some indication of the esteem in which he is held by his fellow writers.

Thwaite died on 22 April 2021 at the age of 90.

== Appraisal of his work ==
Praise for Thwaite's poetry came from many fellow writers. The novelist Anthony Burgess commended him: "Very intelligent, also witty, with a wide stretch of subject matter and a great boldness." The playwright and novelist Michael Frayn wrote, "I think of all the living poets whose work I know Anthony Thwaite speaks to me most strongly and intimately. He writes with simplicity and precision about difficult and ambiguous things....the vastness and richness of the past, the elusiveness of the present - and the heroic persistence of our efforts to fix some trace of all this." Thwaite was pleased to be called "a fine comic poet" by Sean O'Brien. One of his best light poems was included by Christopher Ricks in his Oxford Book of English Verse, and Thwaite is also well represented in Larkin's Oxford Book of Twentieth Century Verse. Tobias Hill called him "a master of domestic disquiet" in The Times, reviewing his Collected Poems (2007). He wrote: "This is spectacular poetry. It deserves to be read: good readers deserve to read it."

== Works ==
- Anthony Thwaite (Fantasy Press, 1953). Fantasy Poets 17
- Oxford Poetry 1954 (1954), editor with Jonathan Price
- Poems (1957). Privately printed in Tokyo
- Essays on Contemporary English Poetry (1957)
- Home Truths (1957), poems
- Contemporary English Poetry - An Introduction (1961)
- New Poems 1961: A P.E.N Anthology of Contemporary Poetry (1961), editor with Hilary Corke and William Plomer
- The Owl in the Tree (1963), poems
- Japan in Color (1967)
- The Stones of Emptiness: Poems 1963-66 (1967)
- Deserts of Hesperides: an Experience in Libya (1969)
- At Dunkeswell Abbey (1970), broadside poem
- Penguin Modern Poets 18 (1970), with A. Alvarez and Roy Fuller
- Points (1972)
- Inscriptions, Poems 1967–72 (1973)
- Jack (1973) poem
- Poetry Today 1960-1973 (1973)
- Roloff Beny In Italy (1974), with Peter Porter, Gore Vidal
- New Confessions (1974), poems
- The English Poets - From Chaucer to Edward Thomas (1974), with Peter Porter
- Beyond the Inhabited World: Roman Britain (1977)
- A Portion for Foxes (1977), poems
- Twelve Poems (1978)
- Twentieth Century English Poetry : An Introduction (1978)
- New Poetry 4 (1978), Arts Council anthology, editor with Fleur Adcock
- Victorian Voices (1980), poems
- Odyssey : Mirror of the Mediterranean (1981)
- Larkin at Sixty (1982) editor
- The Penguin Book of Japanese Verse (1983), editor with Geoffrey Bownas
- Telling Tales (1983)
- Poems 1953–1983 (1984)
- Six Centuries of Verse (1984), editor
- Poetry Today : A Critical Guide to British Poetry 1960–1984 (1985)
- Letter from Tokyo (1987)
- Collected Poems – Philip Larkin (The Marvell Press, Faber & Faber, 1988), editor
- Fourteen Poems Collected Poems of Philip Larkin (1989), editor
- Selected Letters of Philip Larkin, 1940–1985 (1992), editor
- Poetry Today: A critical guide to British poetry 1960–1995 (1996)
- R. S. Thomas - Everyman's Poetry (1996), editor
- Selected Poems 1956–1996 (1997)
- Longfellow (1997) editor
- Anthony Thwaite in Conversation (1999), with Peter Dale and Ian Hamilton
- Paeans for Peter Porter (1999), editor
- High Windows by Philip Larkin (2000), editor
- A Different Country (Enitharmon Press 2000), poems
- George MacBeth – Selected Poems (2002), editor
- Further Requirements: Interviews, Broadcasts, Statements and Book Reviews, 1952–85, by Philip Larkin (2002), editor
- A Move in the Weather: Poems 1994–2002 (Enitharmon Press, 2003)
- Collected Poems – Philip Larkin (2003), editor
- Collected Poems (Enitharmon Press, 2007)
- Philip Larkin: Letters to Monica (Faber & Faber, Bodleian Library, 2010), editor
- Going Out (Enitharmon Press, 2015)
