= Jill (novel) =

1946 novel by Philip Larkin

- First edition (1946)
- Author: Philip Larkin
- Language: English
- Publication date: 1946

Jill is a novel by English writer Philip Larkin, first published in 1946 by The Fortune Press, and reprinted by Faber and Faber (London) in 1964. It was written in 1943 and '44, when Larkin was twenty-one years old and an undergraduate at St John's College, Oxford.

== Plot summary ==
The novel is set in wartime Oxford, the city in which it was written. Protagonist John Kemp is a young man from "Huddlesford" in Lancashire, who goes down to Oxford. With great sympathy it analyses his emotions at this first experience of privileged southern life (he had never been south of Crewe). Socially awkward and inexperienced, Kemp is attracted by the reckless and dissipated life of his roommate Christopher Warner, a well-off southerner who has attended a minor public school, tellingly called "Lamprey College". The eponymous Jill is Kemp's imaginary sister, whom he invents to confound Warner. Kemp then discovers a real-life Jill called Gillian, the 15-year-old cousin of Warner's friend Elizabeth. Kemp becomes infatuated with Gillian, but his advances are thwarted by Elizabeth and rebuffed by Gillian.

Larkin writes of his own experiences of Oxford during the war in the Introduction he added for the republication by Faber and Faber in 1964:

Life in college was austere. Its pre-war pattern had been dispersed, in some instances permanently ... This was not the Oxford of Michael Fane and his fine bindings, or Charles Ryder and his plovers' eggs. Nevertheless, it had a distinctive quality.

A boy with the surname Bleaney (we are not told his Christian name or indeed anything else about him) makes a fleeting appearance in 'Jill' as one of John Kemp's classmates at Huddlesford Grammar School. Larkin later used this unusual surname in his well-known poem 'Mr Bleaney', although there is nothing to indicate that it refers to the same person.

== Larkin's view of the novel ==
Larkin considered the novel a youthful 'indiscretion' and described the plot as "immature". The first draft was heavily cut by the printer and Larkin later wrote: "I am sick of the Fortune Press. They only publish dirty novels and any printer who does their work is extra suspicious." No manuscript version exists, and Bloomfield, in his 1979 bibliography, says that Larkin destroyed the original typescript. When the book was re-published, Larkin reinstated the censored material.

== Reprints ==
The book was later published in the USA, first by St. Martin's Press in 1965 and then, in 1976, by The Overlook Press, a small American publisher with a reputation for stylish limited editions. Jill was published in paperback by Faber and Faber, ISBN 0-571-22582-9 in 2005.
