= Church Going =

Poem by Philip Larkin

"Church Going" is a poem by the English poet Philip Larkin (1922–1985) that is generally regarded as one of his masterpieces. Larkin's first draft of the poem was dated 24 April 1954. He worked through 21 pages of drafts, abandoned it, then took it back up, emerging with his final version in July 1954. "Church Going" was published in The Less Deceived. Larkin's fondness for English ecclesiastical architecture, and the seriousness of mood he felt in such places, are apparent in the poem, standing in contrast to his cynicism about Christianity. "Church Going" is notable for its reference to the "cycle-clips" often associated in the popular imagination with Larkin during his lifetime.

== Synopsis ==
In the poem, Larkin explores the experience of visiting a church. He declares himself unsure why he "often" stops at churches whilst out cycling, as he finds himself "at a loss" about what he is looking for – both literally, and spiritually. He considers how the buildings are falling out of use, and what they might become in the future. The final stanza of the poem adopts a more conclusive tone about this "serious house on serious earth", to which people will always be drawn, if only because so many people before them have been drawn there – and so many are buried in the churchyard.
