= Hull History Centre =

English archive and library

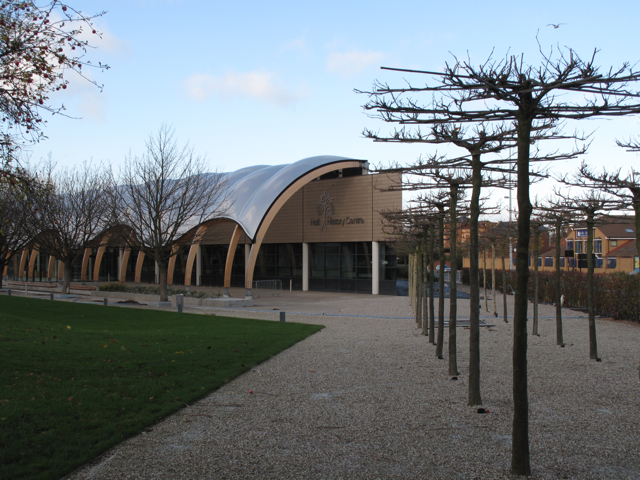
- 53.74795°N 0.33641°W
- Location: Worship Street; Hull; HU2 8BG, England
- Type: Public archive
- Established: 2010
- Branch of: County Archive Research Network

Other information
- Website: www.hullhistorycentre.org.uk

The Hull History Centre is an archive and local studies library in Hull, England. It houses the combined collections of both the Hull City Council and Hull University archives and local studies resources. This collaboration between Hull City Council, Hull University, and the Heritage Lottery Fund made Hull the first city in the UK to unite local council and university collections under one roof.

== Background ==
Before the creation of the Hull History Centre, Hull's archives were kept in three separate repositories: the University of Hull, the Local Studies Library, and the Hull City Archives. The partnership that led to the purpose-built history centre in Hull began nearly ten years ago, springing out of a desire to provide greater accessibility to, and better preservation facilities for the archives. Plans began to develop between Hull City Council and the University of Hull, and ultimately the Heritage Lottery Fund made the dream a reality by providing the Hull History Centre with a £7.7 million grant, the largest ever lottery grant for a UK archive project. Building for the centre began in late 2007 and on 25 January 2010, the Hull History Centre was finally opened to the public.

The building itself was designed by architectural firm Pringle Richards Sharratt with the goals of providing a highly accessible and visible structure, as well as a focus of local pride. The design of the upper floor features an environmentally controlled repository while the ground level features public spaces adjoined by a linear arcade overlooking a new park.

== Collections ==
The Hull History Centre houses the combined archives of Hull City Council and the University of Hull, along with other various local studies resources. The collections include the standard books, volumes, and documents, as well as maps, paintings, pamphlets, photos, and film. If lined up end to end, the History Centre's collections would cross the local 2,220-metre-long Humber Bridge four times.

=== Main Collections ===
==== University Collections ====
The University Collections are made up of about 750,000 documents consisting of around 200 organisations, individuals, and families. The range includes:

- Pressure group records: including Liberty (formerly The National Council for Civil Liberties), Union of Democratic Control, and Justice
- Modern political papers: including John Prescott, Kevin McNamara, Austin Mitchell, Chris Mullin, Sir Patrick Wall, and Jock Haston
- Modern English literary manuscripts: including Philip Larkin, Douglas Dunn, Archie Markham, and Alan Plater
- Landed family and estate archives: including Hotham of South Dalton, Sykes of Sledmere, and Constable Maxwell of Everingham
- Trades Union and labour archives: including numerous local trades unions and national figures such as W.E. Jones, Lord Ammon, and Julia Varley
- Business Records: including Ellerman's Wilson Line, Earle's Shipbuilding & Engineering Company, and The Hull & East Riding Co-operative Society
- Religious archives: including local Quaker records, some papers of Selby Abbey and Marrick Priory, and of Conrad Noel and Stanley Evans
- South-East Asian manuscripts: including research collections of Mervyn Jaspan, David Bassett and Harry Parkin
- W.B Yeadon collection, the photographic and documentary collection of LNER railway historian W.B. Yeadon, including much local and northeast of England railway historical material.

==== City Council Collections ====
The City Council Collections are made up of various records and documents of the city. The range includes documents relating to:

- Boroughs: including the royal charter of 1299, issued by King Edward I which established the city of Kingston upon Hull, title deeds of property purchased and sold by the corporation, financial records, and miscellaneous documents relating to Hull Corporation (later Hull City Council)
- Civil Parishes: including documents relating to the Parish of Drypool, the Parish of Garrison Side, the United Parishes of Holy Trinity and St. Mary, the Parish of Sculcoates, the Parish of Southcoates, and the Parish of Sutton and Stoneferry
- Watching, Lighting, Cleansing and Paving Authorities: including documents from the Assessors for Lighting and Cleansing the Streets of Hull, the Hull and Myton Improvement Commissioners, and the Sculcoates Improvement Commissioners
- Boards of Health: including documents from Beverly Rural District, Cottingham Urban District, Holderness Rural District, Hessle Urban District, the Kingston upon Hull Board of Health, Skirlaugh Rural District, the Newington Board of Health, and Sculcoates Rural District
- School Boards: including documents from the Hull School Board, the Newington School Board, and the Sutton and Stoneferry School Board
- Poor Law Authorities: including documents from the Kingston upon Hull Incorporation for the Poor, and the Sculcoates Board of Guardians
- Institutions and Companies: including documents from the Hull Borough Asylum, the Hull Gas Light Company, and the Newington Water Company

==== Local Studies Collections ====
The Local Studies Collections are made up of approximately 150,000 items including books, printed items, large amounts of pamphlets and other material on various topics relating to Hull and the East Riding of Yorkshire. The range includes:

- Periodicals: including local school and parish magazines, newsletters from local societies, and business journals of local companies
- Directories: including the directories of Hull (1791–1939, with local sections of national directories from 1781), North Riding and East Riding of Yorkshire (main file 1872–1937, but some East Riding Village entries from 1823), and Lincolnshire (1856–1972)
- Electoral Registers: including electoral registers of Hull (1835–present) and East Riding of Yorkshire (1949–present)
- Newspapers: including 40 local titles including the general York Courant, as well as the following main titles, available to view on microfilm- Hull Packet (1787–1886), Hull Advertiser (1794–1867), Eastern Counties Herald (1838–1884), Eastern Morning News (1864–1929), Hull News (1852–1929), Hull Times (City and County Editions, 1857–1984), Hull Daily News/Evening News (1884–1929), and the Hull Daily Mail (1885 to present)
- Local Government Records: including Hull Corporation (now Hull City Council) Minutes (1887 to present) and Humberside County Council Minutes (1973–1996)
- Census Returns: full returns available to view on microfilms include Hull and Sculcoates Poor Law Union areas (i.e. town of Hull and immediate surrounding villages, 1841–1901) and Complete East Riding of Yorkshire (1851), with additional returns available to view electronically
- Maps: including Hull town maps (16th century to present), Ordnance Survey maps for Hull and East Riding at various scales (1852 to present), East Riding Enclosure maps, Geological Survey maps, Agricultural Land Classification Survey maps, Soil Survey maps, and Goad Plans
- Illustrations: a collection of over 9,000 loose illustrations including drawings, prints, photographs, postcards, and framed paintings; in addition, a separate collection of 2,000 photographs in the Health Department Collection taken by the Hull Corporation Health Department around the early 1900s
- Ephemera: including theatre bills and programmes, posters, football programmes, postcards, timetables, tradesmen's publicity, etc.
- Special Collections: collections organised by the subject of particular interest to the area, including William Wilberforce and Slavery, Andrew Marvell (1621–1678), Whales and Whaling, Winifred Holtby (1898–1935), Fosters & Andrews (organ builders), and Amy Johnson.

==== Access to the Archives ====
The Hull History Centre offers various ways to access the archives. The online catalogue provides information on over 225,000 documents. The Centre also has a collection of newspapers, census records, and burial records available for viewing on microfilms.

The History Centre also allows customers to view documents. To view documents, customers just need to provide proof of name and address.

Customers can also borrow select items from the loan stock using a Hull Libraries library card.

== Other services ==
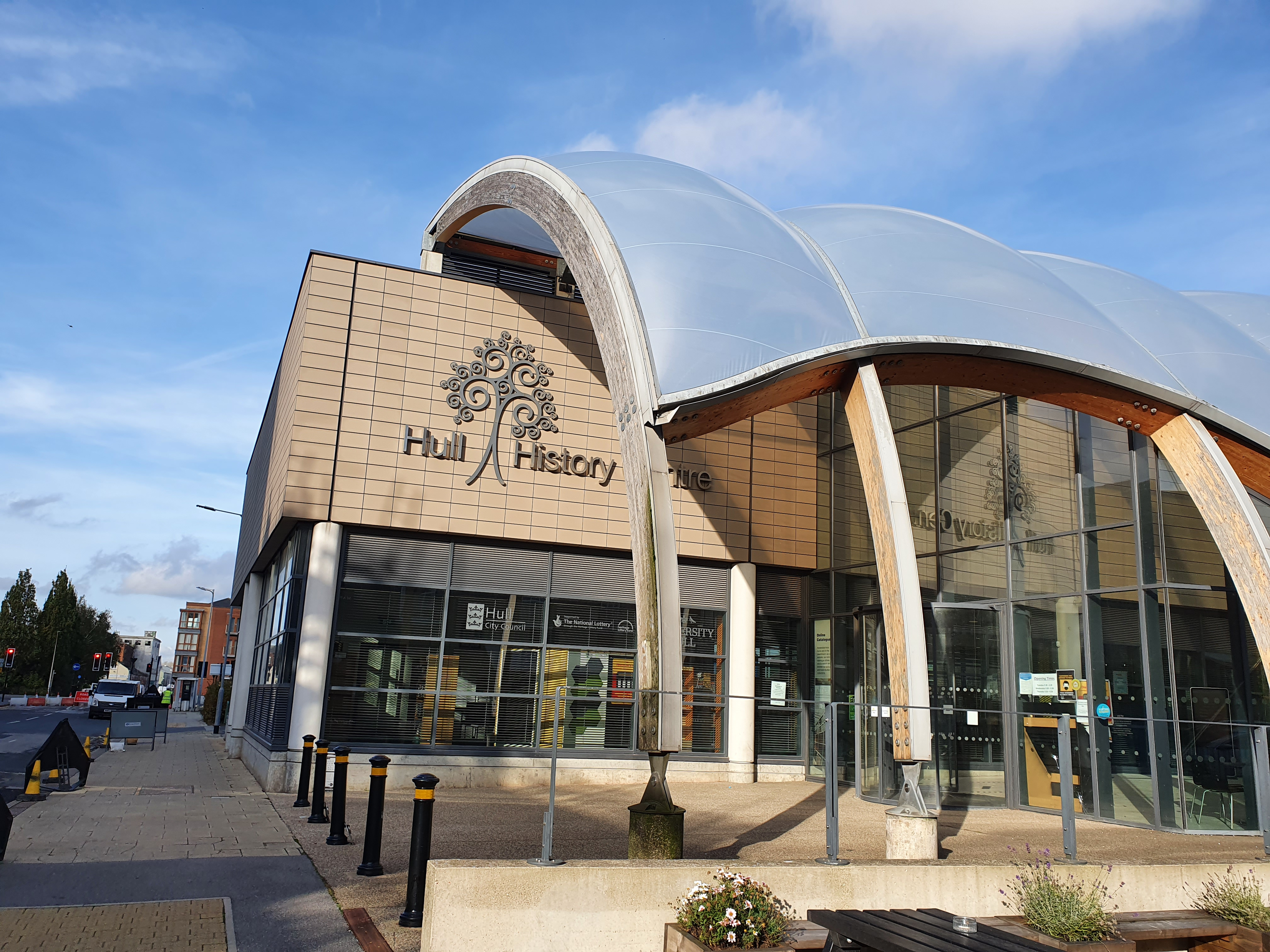
Exterior of Hull History Centre, October 2022

Hull History Centre also regularly offers a range of learning activities such as family events, adult learning courses, and school sessions. The Hull History Centre regularly updates its website with the upcoming events and activities offered.

Family events include storytelling, drama, arts and crafts, or other activities inspired by the archives of the History Centre. The adult learning courses offered vary from one-day classes to five-week courses and explore family and local history.

Additionally, the Hull History Centre offers venue hire, photocopying services, and help and advice from a specialist staff. The Centre is also equipped with full conservation and preservation facilities and services for the collections in its care.
