= Reginald Caton =

English publisher (1897–1971)

Reginald Ashley Caton
- Born: 1897
- Died: 1971 (aged 73–74)
- Occupation: Publisher

Reginald Ashley Caton (1897–1971) was an English publisher. He appears as a literary character, especially in novels by Kingsley Amis.

In 1924, he founded the Fortune Press in London, specialising in gay erotica. Repeated legal difficulties saw his prosecution for obscene libel in 1934.

Caton is celebrated for obtaining the rights to Dylan Thomas's 18 Poems, which he published in 1934, with repercussions for the poet. During the war years, he first rejected Philip Larkin's first novel Jill (for obscenity), but finally published it in 1946, as he did his poetry collection, The North Ship. No manuscript version of Jill has survived.

Caton also published, for example, Nicholas Moore and Wrenne Jarman. Experts have concluded that there was no literary, rather than business, consistency. In 1951, he published Bryan Magee's first book, an anthology of poems entitled Crucifixion and Other Poems.

The Fortune Press was sold to Leonard Holdsworth of the Charles Skilton Publishing Group.
