= Philip Larkin =

English poet, novelist and librarian (1922–1985)

Philip Larkin CH CBE FRSL
- Portrait by Fay Godwin, 1970
- Born: Philip Arthur Larkin; 9 August 1922; Coventry, England
- Died: 2 December 1985 (aged 63); Kingston upon Hull, England
- Resting place: Cottingham municipal cemetery 53°47′00.98″N 0°25′50.19″W
- Monuments: Bronze statue, Martin Jennings (2010, Hull Paragon Interchange station)
- Education: University of Oxford
- Occupations: Poet; librarian; novelist; jazz critic
- Employer: University of Hull (from 1955)
- Writing career
- Notable works: The Whitsun Weddings (1964); High Windows (1974)

Philip Arthur Larkin (9 August 1922 – 2 December 1985) was an English poet, novelist, and librarian. His first book of poetry, The North Ship, was published in 1945, followed by two novels, Jill (1946) and A Girl in Winter (1947). He came to prominence in 1955 with the publication of his second collection of poems, The Less Deceived, followed by The Whitsun Weddings (1964) and High Windows (1974). He contributed to The Daily Telegraph as its jazz critic from 1961 to 1971, with his articles gathered in All What Jazz: A Record Diary 1961–71 (1985), and edited The Oxford Book of Twentieth Century English Verse (1973). His many honours include the Queen's Gold Medal for Poetry. He was offered, but declined, the position of Poet Laureate in 1984, following the death of Sir John Betjeman.

After taking a Double First from Oxford in 1943 in English, Larkin became a librarian. It was during the thirty years he worked with distinction as university librarian at the Brynmor Jones Library at the University of Hull that he produced the greater part of his published work. His poems are marked by what Andrew Motion calls "a very English, glum accuracy" about emotions, places, and relationships, and what Donald Davie described as "lowered sights and diminished expectations". Eric Homberger (echoing Randall Jarrell) called him "the saddest heart in the post-war supermarket"—Larkin himself said that deprivation for him was "what daffodils were for Wordsworth". Influenced by W. H. Auden, W. B. Yeats, and Thomas Hardy, his poems are highly structured but flexible verse forms. They were described by Jean Hartley, the ex-wife of Larkin's publisher George Hartley (the Marvell Press), as a "piquant mixture of lyricism and discontent". Anthologist Keith Tuma writes that there is more to Larkin's work than its reputation for dour pessimism suggests.

Larkin's public persona was that of the no-nonsense, solitary Englishman who disliked fame and had no patience for the trappings of the public literary life. The posthumous publication by Anthony Thwaite in 1992 of his letters triggered controversy about his personal life and political views, described by John Banville as hair-raising but also in places hilarious. Lisa Jardine called him a "casual, habitual racist, and an easy misogynist", but the academic John Osborne argued in 2008 that "the worst that anyone has discovered about Larkin are some crass letters and a taste for porn softer than what passes for mainstream entertainment". Despite the controversy, Larkin was chosen in a 2003 Poetry Book Society survey, almost two decades after his death, as Britain's best-loved poet of the previous 50 years, and in 2008 The Times named him Britain's greatest post-war writer.

In 1973, a Coventry Evening Telegraph reviewer referred to Larkin as "the bard of Coventry", but in 2010, 25 years after his death, it was Larkin's adopted home city, Kingston upon Hull, that commemorated him with the Larkin 25 Festival, which culminated in the unveiling of a statue of Larkin by Martin Jennings on 2 December 2010, the 25th anniversary of his death. On 2 December 2016, the 31st anniversary of his death, a floor stone memorial for Larkin was unveiled at Poets' Corner in Westminster Abbey.

== Life ==
=== Early life and education ===
'You look as if you wished the place in Hell,'
My friend said, 'judging from your face.' 'Oh well,
I suppose it's not the place's fault,' I said.
'Nothing, like something, happens anywhere.'

— from "I Remember, I Remember" (1954),
The Less Deceived

Philip Larkin was born on 9 August 1922 at 2 Poultney Road, Radford, Coventry, the only son and younger child of Sydney Larkin (1884–1948) and his wife Eva Emily (1886–1977), daughter of first-class excise officer William James Day. Sydney Larkin's family originated in Kent, but had lived since at least the eighteenth century at Lichfield, Staffordshire, where they worked first as tailors, then also as coach-builders and shoe-makers. The Day family were from Epping, Essex, but moved to Leigh, Lancashire in 1914 where William Day took a post administering pensions and other dependent allowances.

Larkin's family lived in the district of Radford, Coventry, until Larkin was five years old, before moving to a large three-storey middle-class house complete with servants' quarters near Coventry railway station and King Henry VIII School, in Manor Road. Having survived the bombings of the Second World War, their former house in Manor Road was demolished in the 1960s to make way for a road modernisation programme, the construction of an inner ring road. His sister Catherine, known as Kitty, was 10 years older than he was.

His father, a self-made man who had risen to be the City Treasurer of Coventry, was a singular individual, 'nihilistically disillusioned in middle age', who combined a love of literature with an enthusiasm for Nazism, and had attended two Nuremberg rallies during the mid-1930s. He introduced his son to the works of Ezra Pound, T. S. Eliot, James Joyce and above all D. H. Lawrence. His mother was a nervous and passive woman, "a kind of defective mechanism...Her ideal is 'to collapse' and to be taken care of", dominated by her husband.

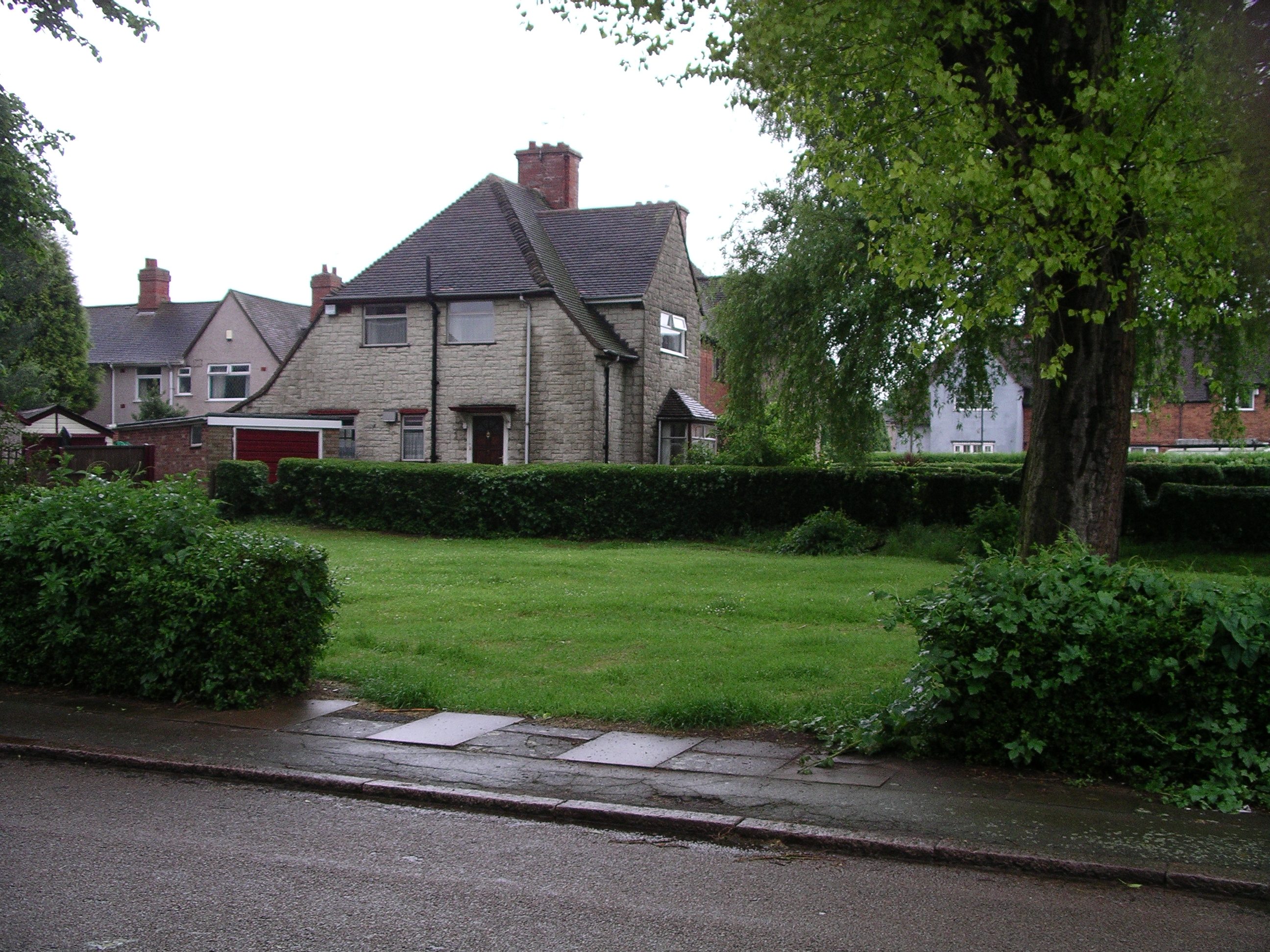
Larkin's parents' former Radford council house overlooking a small spinney, once their garden (photo 2008)

Larkin's early childhood was in some respects unusual: he was educated at home until the age of eight by his mother and sister, neither friends nor relatives ever visited the family home, and he developed a stammer. When he joined Coventry's King Henry VIII Junior School he fitted in immediately and made close, long-standing friendships, such as those with James "Jim" Sutton, Colin Gunner and Noel "Josh" Hughes. Although home life was relatively cold, Larkin enjoyed support from his parents. For example, his deep passion for jazz was supported by the purchase of a drum kit and a saxophone, supplemented by a subscription to DownBeat. From the junior school he progressed to King Henry VIII Senior School. He fared quite poorly when he sat his School Certificate exam at the age of 16. Despite his results, he was allowed to stay on at school. Two years later he earned distinctions in English and History, and passed the entrance examination for St John's College, Oxford, to read English.

Larkin began at Oxford University in October 1940, a year after the outbreak of the Second World War. The old upper-class traditions of university life had, at least for the time being, faded, and most of the male students were studying for highly truncated degrees. Due to his poor eyesight, Larkin failed his military medical examination and was able to study for the usual three years. Through his tutorial partner, Norman Iles, he met Kingsley Amis, who encouraged his taste for ridicule and irreverence and who remained a close friend throughout Larkin's life.

Amis, Larkin and other university friends formed a group they dubbed "The Seven", meeting to discuss each other's poetry, listen to jazz, and drink enthusiastically. During this time he had his first real social interaction with the opposite sex, but made no romantic headway. In 1943 he sat his finals, and, having dedicated much of his time to his own writing, was greatly surprised at being awarded a first-class honours degree.

=== Early career and relationships ===
Why should I let the toad work
Squat on my life?
Can't I use my wit as a pitchfork
And drive the brute off?

— from "Toads" (1954), The Less Deceived

In 1943, Larkin was appointed librarian of the public library in Wellington, Shropshire. Whilst working there, in early 1944, he met his first girlfriend, Ruth Bowman, an academically ambitious 16-year-old schoolgirl. In 1945, Ruth went to continue her studies at King's College London; during one of his visits their friendship developed into a sexual relationship. By June 1946, Larkin was halfway through qualifying for membership of the Library Association and was appointed assistant librarian at University College, Leicester. It was visiting Larkin in Leicester and witnessing the university's Senior Common Room that gave Kingsley Amis the inspiration to write Lucky Jim (1954), the novel that made Amis famous and to whose long gestation Larkin contributed considerably. Six weeks after his father's death from cancer in March 1948, Larkin proposed to Ruth, and that summer the couple spent their annual holiday touring Hardy country.

In June 1950, Larkin was appointed sub-librarian at The Queen's University of Belfast, a post he took up that September. Before his departure he and Ruth split up. At some stage between the appointment to the position at Queen's and the end of the engagement to Ruth, Larkin's friendship with Monica Jones, a lecturer in English at Leicester, also developed into a sexual relationship. He spent five years in Belfast, which appear to have been the most contented of his life. While his relationship with Jones developed, he also had "the most satisfyingly erotic [experience] of his life" with Patsy Strang, who at the time was in an open marriage with one of his colleagues.

At one stage, she offered to leave her husband to marry Larkin. From 1951 onwards Larkin holidayed with Jones in various locations around the British Isles. While in Belfast he also had a significant though sexually undeveloped friendship with Winifred Arnott, the subject of "Lines on a Young Lady's Photograph Album", which came to an end when she married in 1954. This was the period in which he gave Kingsley Amis extensive advice on the writing of Lucky Jim. Amis repaid the debt by dedicating the finished book to Larkin.

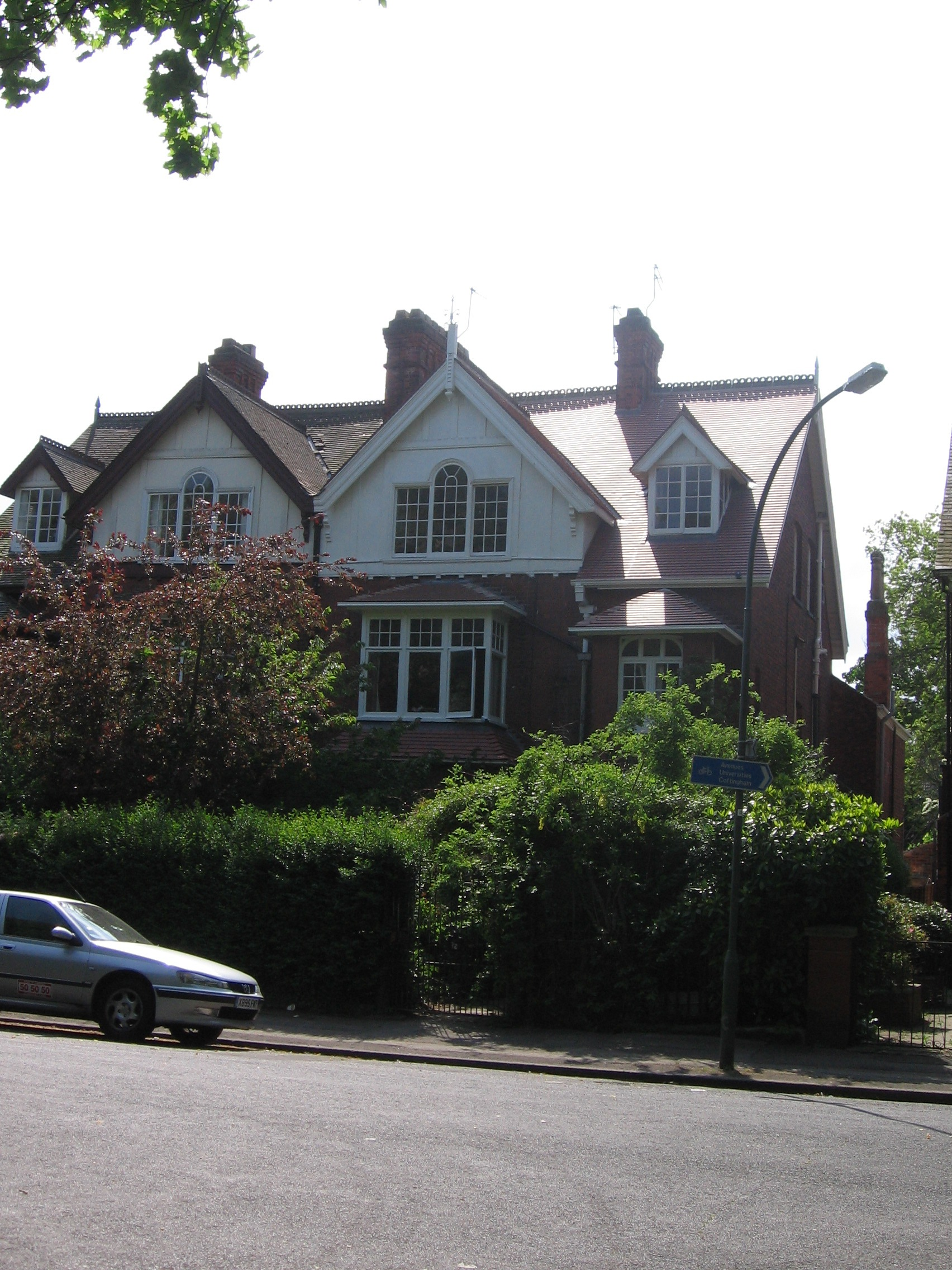
This second-floor flat overlooking Pearson Park in Hull was Larkin's rented accommodation from 1956 to 1974 (photo 2008).

In 1955, Larkin became University Librarian at the University of Hull, a post he held until his death. Professor R. L. Brett, who was chairman of the library committee that appointed him and a friend, wrote, "At first I was impressed with the time he spent in his office, arriving early and leaving late. It was only later that I realised that his office was also his study where he spent hours on his private writing as well as the work of the library. Then he would return home and on a good many evenings start writing again." For his first year he lodged in bedsits. In 1956, at the age of 34, he rented a self-contained flat on the top floor of 32 Pearson Park, a three-storey red-brick house overlooking the park, previously the American Consulate. This, it seems, was the vantage point later commemorated in the poem High Windows.

Of the city itself, Larkin commented: "I never thought about Hull until I was here. Having got here, it suits me in many ways. It is a little on the edge of things, I think even its natives would say that. I rather like being on the edge of things. One doesn't really go anywhere by design, you know, you put in for jobs and move about, you know, I've lived in other places."

In the post-war years, Hull University underwent significant expansion, as was typical of British universities during that period. When Larkin took up his appointment there, the plans for a new university library were already far advanced. He made a great effort in just a few months to familiarize himself with them before they were placed before the University Grants Committee; he suggested a number of emendations, some major and structural, all of which were adopted. It was built in two stages, and in 1967 it was named the Brynmor Jones Library after Sir Brynmor Jones, the university's vice-chancellor.

One of Larkin's colleagues at Hull said he became a great figure in post-war British librarianship. Ten years after the new library's completion, Larkin computerized records for the entire library stock, making it the first library in Europe to install a Geac computer system, an automated online circulation system. Richard Goodman wrote that Larkin excelled as an administrator, committee man and arbitrator. "He treated his staff decently, and he motivated them", Goodman said. "He did this with a combination of efficiency, high standards, humour and compassion." He rejected the Net Book Agreement. From 1957 until his death, Larkin's secretary was Betty Mackereth. All access to him by his colleagues was through her, and she came to know as much about Larkin's compartmentalized life as anyone. During his 30 years there, the library's stock sextupled, and the budget expanded from £4,500 to £448,500, in real terms a twelvefold increase.

=== Later life ===
Dockery, now:
Only nineteen, he must have taken stock
Of what he wanted, and been capable
Of . . . No, that's not the difference: rather how
Convinced he was he should be added to!
Why did he think adding meant increase?
To me it was dilution.

— from "Dockery and Son" (1963),
The Whitsun Weddings

In February 1961, Larkin's friendship with his colleague Maeve Brennan became romantic, despite her strong Roman Catholic beliefs. In early 1963 Brennan persuaded him to go with her to a dance for university staff, despite his preference for smaller gatherings. This seems to have been a pivotal moment in their relationship, and he memorialised it in his longest (and unfinished) poem "The Dance". Around this time, also at her prompting, Larkin learnt to drive and bought a car – his first, a Singer Gazelle. Meanwhile, Monica Jones, whose parents had died in 1959, bought a holiday cottage in Haydon Bridge, near Hexham, which she and Larkin visited regularly. His poem "Show Saturday" is a description of the 1973 Bellingham show in the North Tyne valley.

In 1964, following the publication of The Whitsun Weddings, Larkin was the subject of an edition of the arts programme Monitor, directed by Patrick Garland. The programme, which shows him being interviewed by fellow poet John Betjeman in a series of locations in and around Hull, allowed Larkin to play a significant part in the creation of his own public persona; one he would prefer his readers to imagine.

In 1968, Larkin was offered the OBE, which he declined. Later in life he accepted the offer of being made a Member of the Order of the Companions of Honour. In 1976, the Hamburg-based Alfred Toepfer Foundation awarded Larkin its annual Shakespeare Prize in recognition of his life's work.

Larkin's role in the creation of Hull University's new Brynmor Jones Library had been important and demanding. Soon after the completion of the second and larger phase of construction in 1969, he was able to redirect his energies. In October 1970, he started to work on compiling a new anthology, The Oxford Book of Twentieth Century English Verse (1973). He was awarded a Visiting Fellowship at All Souls College, Oxford, for two academic terms, allowing him to consult Oxford's Bodleian Library, a copyright library. While he was in Oxford he passed responsibility for the Library to his deputy, Brenda Moon. Larkin was a major contributor to the re-evaluation of the poetry of Thomas Hardy, which, in comparison to his novels, had been overlooked; in Larkin's "idiosyncratic" and "controversial" anthology,

Hardy was the poet most generously represented. There were twenty-seven poems by Hardy, compared with only nine by T. S. Eliot, however, Eliot is most famous for long poems. The other poets most extensively represented were W. B. Yeats, W. H. Auden and Rudyard Kipling. Larkin included six of his own poems—the same number as for Rupert Brooke. In the process of compiling the volume he had been disappointed not to find more and better poems as evidence that the clamour over the Modernists had stifled the voices of traditionalists. The most favourable responses to the anthology were those of Auden and John Betjeman, while the most hostile was that of Donald Davie, who accused Larkin of "positive cynicism" and of encouraging "the perverse triumph of philistinism, the cult of the amateur ... [and] the weakest kind of Englishry". After an initial period of anxiety about the anthology's reception, Larkin enjoyed the clamour.

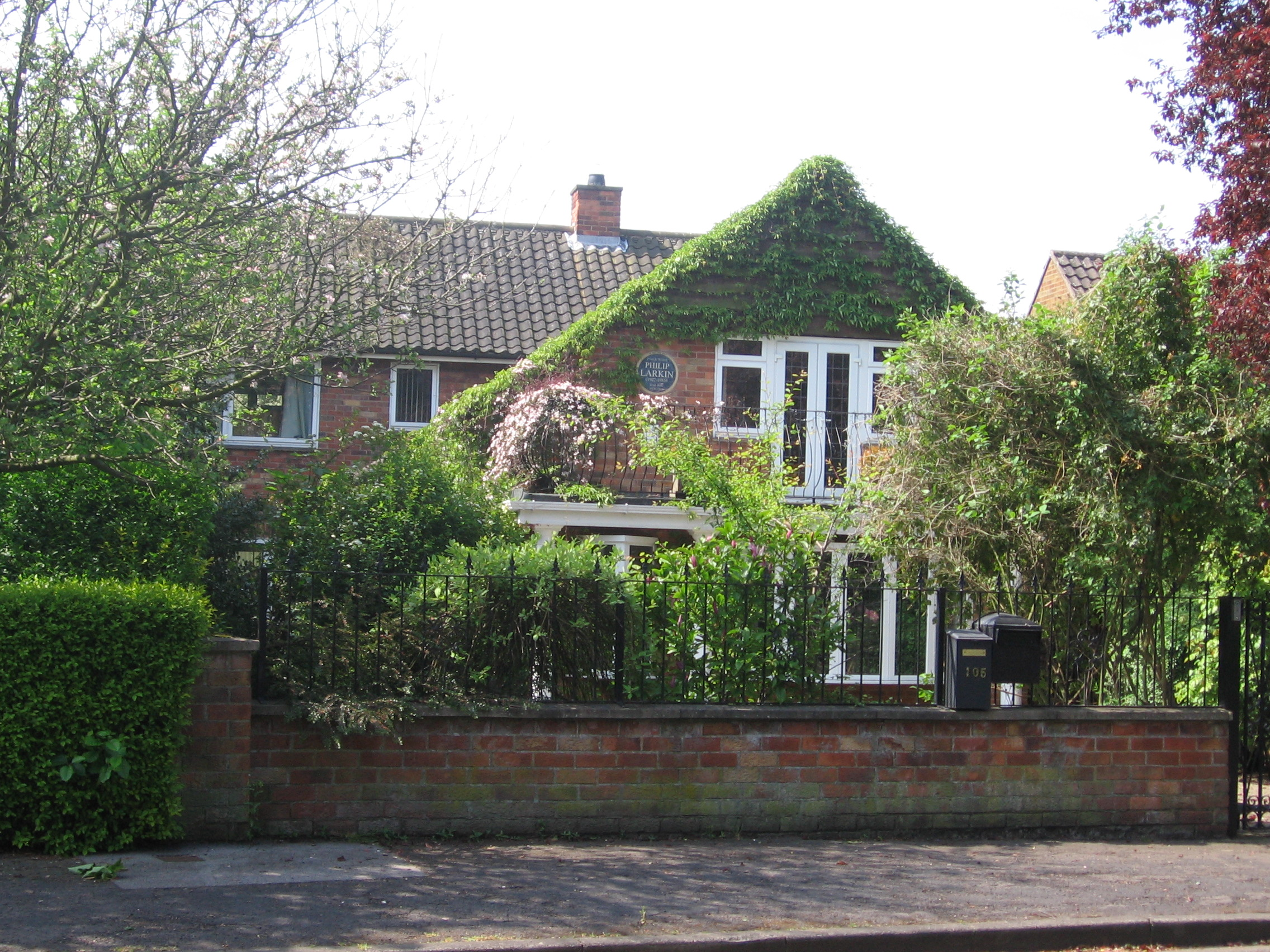
105 Newland Park, Hull, was Larkin's home from 1974 to his death in 1985 (photo 2008).

In 1971, Larkin regained contact with his schoolfriend Colin Gunner, who had led a picaresque life. Their subsequent correspondence has gained notoriety as Larkin expressed right-wing views and used racist language. From 1973 to 1974, Larkin became an Honorary Fellow of St John's College, Oxford, and was awarded honorary degrees by Warwick, St Andrews and Sussex universities. In January 1974, Hull University informed Larkin that they were going to dispose of the building on Pearson Park in which he lived. Shortly afterwards he bought a detached two-storey 1950s house in Newland Park which was described by his university colleague John Kenyon as "an entirely middle-class backwater". Larkin, who moved into the house in June, thought the four-bedroom property "utterly undistinguished" and reflected, "I can't say it's the kind of dwelling that is eloquent of the nobility of the human spirit".

Shortly after splitting up with Maeve Brennan in August 1973, Larkin attended W. H. Auden's memorial service at Christ Church, Oxford, with Monica Jones as his official partner. In March 1975, the relationship with Brennan restarted, and three weeks after this he initiated a secret affair with Betty Mackereth, who served as his secretary for 28 years, writing the long-undiscovered poem "We met at the end of the party" for her. Despite the logistical difficulties of having three relationships simultaneously, the situation continued until March 1978. From then on he and Jones were a monogamous couple.

In 1976, Larkin was the guest of Roy Plomley on BBC's Desert Island Discs. His choice of music included "Dallas Blues" by Louis Armstrong, Spem in alium by Thomas Tallis and the Symphony No. 1 in A flat major by Edward Elgar. His favourite piece was "I'm Down in the Dumps" by Bessie Smith.

In December 2010, as part of the commemorations of the 25th anniversary of Larkin's death, the BBC broadcast a programme entitled Philip Larkin and the Third Woman focusing on his affair with Mackereth in which she spoke for the first time about their relationship. It included a reading of a newly discovered secret poem, Dear Jake, and revealed that Mackereth was one of the inspirations for his writings.

=== Final years and death ===
Being brave
Lets no one off the grave.
Death is no different whined at than withstood.

— from "Aubade" (1977), Collected Poems

Larkin turned sixty in 1982. This was marked most significantly by a collection of essays entitled Larkin at Sixty, edited by Anthony Thwaite and published by Faber and Faber. There were also two television programmes: an episode of The South Bank Show presented by Melvyn Bragg in which Larkin made off-camera contributions, and a half-hour special on the BBC that was devised and presented by the Labour Shadow Cabinet Minister Roy Hattersley.

In 1983, Jones was hospitalised with shingles. The severity of her symptoms, including its effects on her eyes, distressed Larkin. As her health declined, regular care became necessary: within a month she moved into his Newland Park home and remained there for the rest of her life.

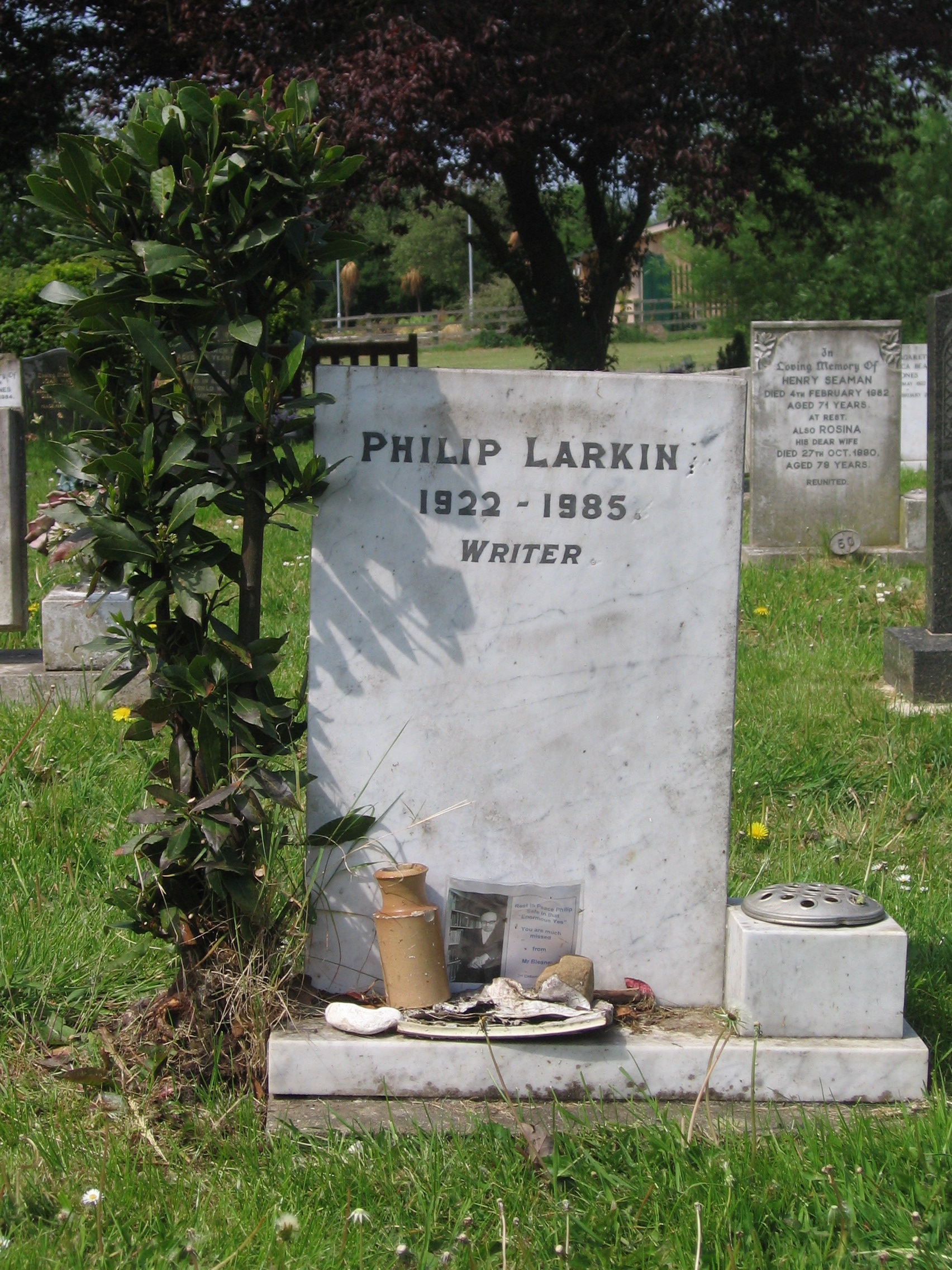
The headstone marking Larkin's grave at Cottingham municipal cemetery, Cottingham, East Riding of Yorkshire

At the memorial service for John Betjeman, who died in July 1984, Larkin was asked if he would accept the post of Poet Laureate. He declined, not least because he felt he had long since ceased to be a writer of poetry in a meaningful sense. The following year, Larkin began to suffer from oesophageal cancer. On 11 June 1985, he underwent surgery, but his cancer was found to have spread and was inoperable. On 28 November, he collapsed and was readmitted to hospital. He died four days later, on 2 December 1985, at the age of 63, and was buried at Cottingham municipal cemetery near Hull.

Larkin had asked on his deathbed that his diaries be destroyed. The request was granted by Jones, the main beneficiary of his will, and Betty Mackereth; the latter shredded the unread diaries page by page, then had them burned. His will was found to be contradictory regarding his other private papers and unpublished work; legal advice left the issue to the discretion of his literary executors, who decided the material should not be destroyed. When she died on 15 February 2001, Jones, in turn, left £1 million split between St Paul's Cathedral, Hexham Abbey and Durham Cathedral, and another £1 million to the National Trust. Larkin is commemorated with a green plaque on The Avenues, Kingston upon Hull.

== Creative output ==
=== Juvenilia and early works ===
And kneel upon the stone,
For we have tried
All courages on these despairs,
And are required lastly to give up pride,
And the last difficult pride in being humble.

— from "Come then to prayers" (1946), Collected Poems

From his mid-teens, Larkin "wrote ceaselessly", producing both poetry, initially modelled on Eliot and W. H. Auden, and fiction: he wrote five full-length novels, each of which he destroyed shortly after their completion. While he was at Oxford University, his first published poem, "Ultimatum", appeared in The Listener.

He developed a pseudonymous alter ego in this period for his prose: Brunette Coleman. Under this name he wrote two novellas, Trouble at Willow Gables and Michaelmas Term at St Brides (2002), as well as a supposed autobiography and an equally fictitious creative manifesto called "What we are writing for". Richard Bradford has written that these curious works show "three registers: cautious indifference, archly overwritten symbolism with a hint of Lawrence and prose that appears to disclose its writer's involuntary feelings of sexual excitement".

After these works, Larkin began to write his first published novel Jill (1946). This was published by Reginald A. Caton, a publisher of barely legal pornography, who also issued serious fiction as a cover for his core activities. Around the time that Jill was being prepared for publication, Caton inquired of Larkin if he also wrote poetry. This resulted in the publication, three months before Jill, of The North Ship (1945), a collection of poems written between 1942 and 1944 which showed the increasing influence of Yeats. Immediately after completing Jill, Larkin started work on the novel A Girl in Winter (1947), completing it in 1945. This was published by Faber and Faber and was well received, The Sunday Times calling it "an exquisite performance and nearly faultless". Subsequently, he made at least three concerted attempts at writing a third novel, but none developed beyond a solid start.

=== Mature works ===
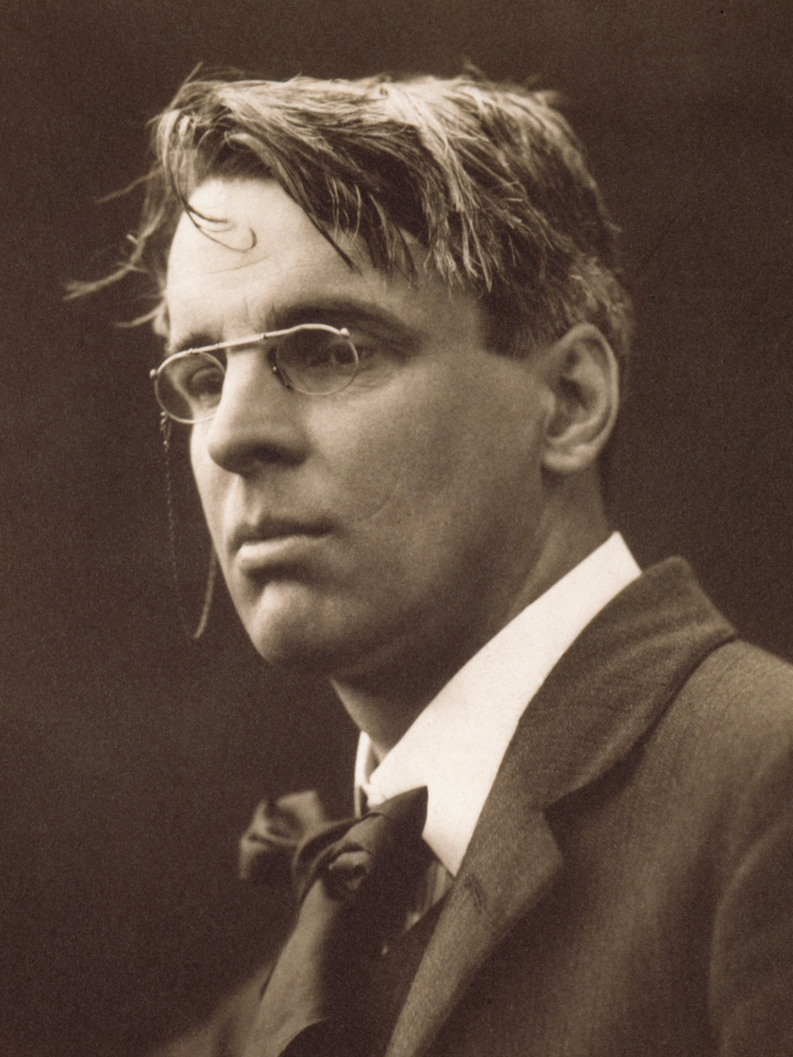
William Butler Yeats, whose poetry was an influence on Larkin in the mid-1940s

During his five years at Belfast, Larkin reached maturity as a poet. The bulk of his next published collection of poems, The Less Deceived (1955), was written there, though eight of the twenty-nine poems included were from the late 1940s. This period also saw Larkin make his final attempts at writing prose fiction, and he gave extensive help to Kingsley Amis with Lucky Jim, which was Amis's first published novel. In October 1954, an article in The Spectator made the first use of the title The Movement to describe the dominant trend in British post-war literature. Poems by Larkin were included in a 1953 PEN Anthology that also featured poems by Amis and Robert Conquest, and Larkin was seen to be a part of this grouping. In 1951, Larkin compiled a collection called XX Poems which he had privately printed in a run of just 100 copies. Many of the poems in it subsequently appeared in his next published volume.

In November 1955, The Less Deceived, was published by the Marvell Press, an independent company in Hessle near Hull (dated October). At first, the volume attracted little attention, but in December it was included in The Times' list of Books of the Year. From this point, the book's reputation spread and sales blossomed throughout 1956 and 1957. During his first five years in Hull, the pressures of work slowed Larkin's output to an average of just two-and-a-half poems a year, but this period saw the writing of some of his best-known poems, such as "An Arundel Tomb", "The Whitsun Weddings" and "Here".

In 1963, Faber and Faber reissued Jill, with the addition of a long introduction by Larkin that included much information about his time at Oxford University and his friendship with Kingsley Amis. This acted as a prelude to the publication the following year of The Whitsun Weddings, the volume which cemented his reputation; a Fellowship of the Royal Society of Literature was granted to Larkin almost immediately. In the years that followed, Larkin wrote several of his most best-known poems, followed in the 1970s by a series of longer and more sober poems, including "The Building" and "The Old Fools".

All of these appeared in Larkin's final collection, High Windows, which was published in June 1974. Its more direct use of language meant that it did not meet with uniform praise; nonetheless it sold over twenty thousand copies in its first year alone. For some critics it represents a falling-off from his previous two books, yet it contains a number of his much-loved pieces, including "This Be The Verse" and "The Explosion", as well as the title poem. "Annus Mirabilis" (Year of Wonder), also from that volume, contains the frequently quoted observation that sexual intercourse began in 1963, which the narrator claims was "rather late for me". Bradford, prompted by comments in Maeve Brennan's memoir, suggests that the poem commemorates Larkin's relationship with Brennan moving from the romantic to the sexual.

Later in 1974, he started work on his final major published poem, "Aubade". It was completed in 1977 and published in 23 December issue of The Times Literary Supplement. After "Aubade" Larkin wrote only one poem that has attracted close critical attention, the posthumously published and intensely personal "Love Again".

=== Poetic style ===
I work all day, and get half-drunk at night.
Waking at four to soundless dark, I stare.
In time the curtain-edges will grow light.
Till then I see what's really always there:
Unresting death, a whole day nearer now,
Making all thought impossible but how
And where and when I shall myself die.

— from "Aubade" (1977), Collected Poems

Larkin's poetry has been characterized as combining "an ordinary, colloquial style", "clarity", a "quiet, reflective tone", "ironic understatement" and a "direct" engagement with "commonplace experiences", while Jean Hartley summed his style up as a "piquant mixture of lyricism and discontent".

Larkin's earliest work showed the influence of Eliot, Auden and Yeats, and the development of his mature poetic identity in the early 1950s coincided with the growing influence on him of Thomas Hardy. The "mature" Larkin style, first evident in The Less Deceived, is "that of the detached, sometimes lugubrious, sometimes tender observer", who, in Hartley's phrase, looks at "ordinary people doing ordinary things". He disparaged poems that relied on "shared classical and literary allusions – what he called the myth-kitty, and the poems are never cluttered with elaborate imagery." Larkin's mature poetic persona is notable for its "plainness and scepticism". Other recurrent features of his mature work are sudden openings and "highly-structured but flexible verse forms".

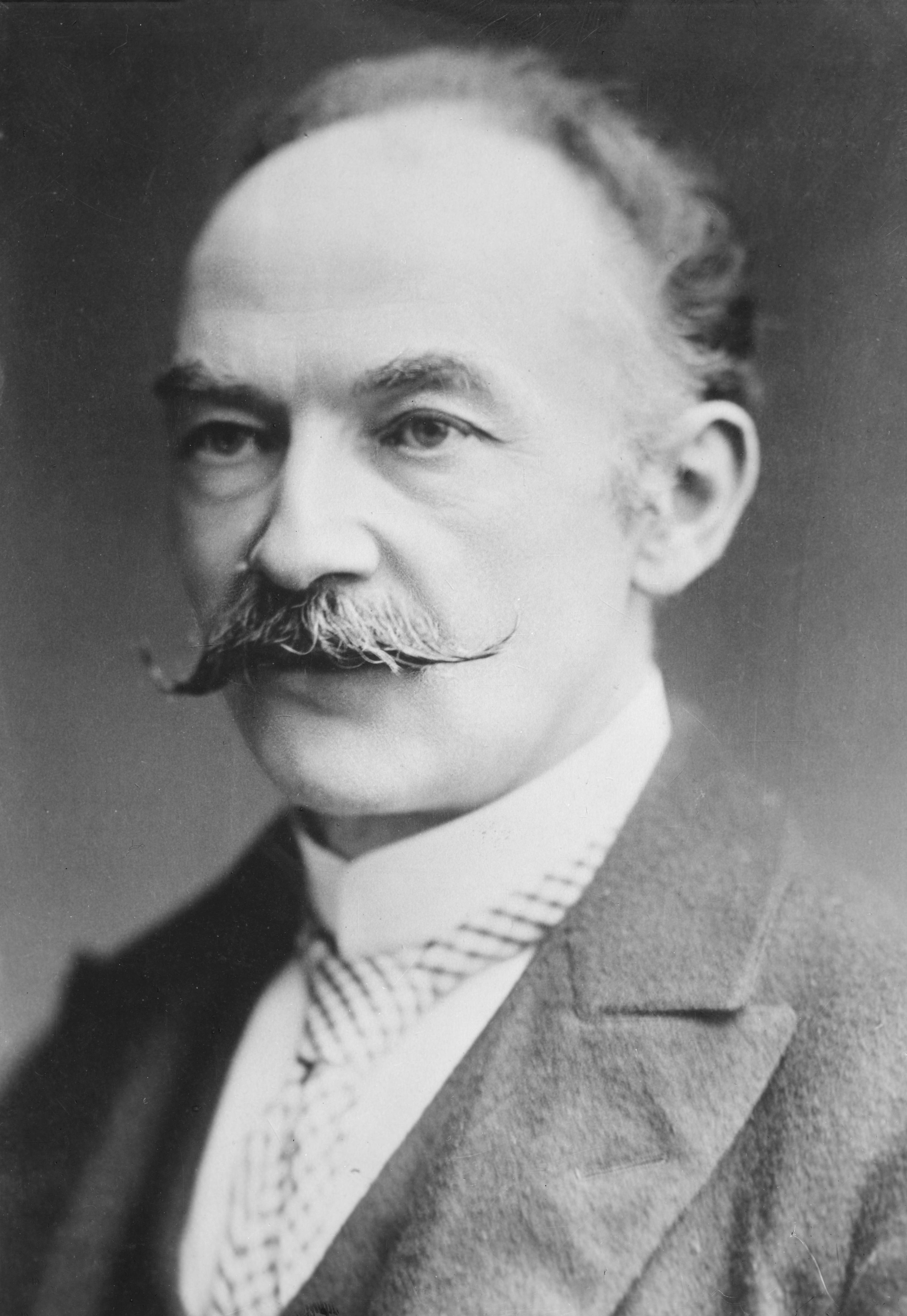
The poetry of Thomas Hardy was the influence that helped Larkin reach his mature style.

Terence Hawkes has argued that while most of the poems in The North Ship are "metaphoric in nature, heavily indebted to Yeats's symbolist lyrics", the subsequent development of Larkin's mature style is "not ... a movement from Yeats to Hardy, but rather a surrounding of the Yeatsian moment (the metaphor) within a Hardyesque frame". In Hawkes's view, "Larkin's poetry ... revolves around two losses": the "loss of modernism", which manifests itself as "the desire to find a moment of epiphany", and "the loss of England, or rather the loss of the British Empire, which requires England to define itself in its own terms when previously it could define 'Englishness' in opposition to something else."

In 1972, Larkin wrote the oft-quoted "Going, Going", a poem which expresses a romantic fatalism in its view of England that was typical of his later years. In it he prophesies a complete destruction of the countryside, and expresses an idealised sense of national togetherness and identity: "And that will be England gone ... it will linger on in galleries; but all that remains for us will be concrete and tyres". The poem ends with the blunt statement, "I just think it will happen, soon."

Larkin's style is bound up with his recurring themes and subjects, which include death and fatalism, as in his final major poem "Aubade". Poet Andrew Motion observes of Larkin's poems: "their rage or contempt is always checked by the ... energy of their language and the satisfactions of their articulate formal control". Motion contrasts two aspects of his poetic personality—on the one hand, an enthusiasm for "symbolist moments" and "freely imaginative narratives", and on the other a "remorseless factuality" and "crudity of language". Motion defines this as a "life-enhancing struggle between opposites", and concludes that his poetry is typically "ambivalent": "His three mature collections have developed attitudes and styles of ... imaginative daring: in their prolonged debates with despair, they testify to wide sympathies, contain passages of frequently transcendent beauty, and demonstrate a poetic inclusiveness which is of immense consequence for his literary heirs."

=== Prose non-fiction ===
Larkin was a critic of modernism in contemporary art and literature. His scepticism is at its most nuanced and illuminating in Required Writing, a collection of his book reviews and essays, and at its most inflamed and polemical in his introduction to his collected jazz reviews, All What Jazz, drawn from the 126 record-review columns he wrote for The Daily Telegraph between 1961 and 1971, which contains an attack on modern jazz that widens into a wholesale critique of modernism in the arts. Larkin (not unwillingly) acquired a reputation as an enemy of modernism, but recent critical assessments of Larkin's writings have identified them as possessing some modernist characteristics.

== Legacy ==
=== Reception history ===
Life is an immobile, locked,
Three-handed struggle between
Your wants, the world's for you, and (worse)
The unbeatable slow machine
That brings what you'll get.

— from "The Life with a Hole in it" (1974),
Collected Poems

When first published in 1945, The North Ship received just one review, in the Coventry Evening Telegraph, which concluded "Mr Larkin has an inner vision that must be sought for with care. His recondite imagery is couched in phrases that make up in a kind of wistful hinted beauty what they lack in lucidity. Mr Larkin's readers must at present be confined to a small circle. Perhaps his work will gain wider appeal as his genius becomes more mature?" A few years later, though, the poet and critic Charles Madge came across the book and wrote to Larkin with his compliments. When the collection was reissued in 1966, it was presented as a work of juvenilia, and the reviews were gentle and respectful; the most forthright praise came from Elizabeth Jennings in The Spectator: "few will question the intrinsic value of The North Ship or the importance of its being reprinted now. It is good to know that Larkin could write so well when still so young."

The Less Deceived was first noticed by The Times, who included it in its List of Books of 1955. In its wake many other reviews followed; "most of them concentrated ... on the book's emotional impact and its sophisticated, witty language." The Spectator felt the collection was "in the running for the best published in this country since the war"; G. S. Fraser, referring to Larkin's perceived association with The Movement felt that Larkin exemplified "everything that is good in this 'new movement' and none of its faults". The Times Literary Supplement called him "a poet of quite exceptional importance".

In June 1956, the Times Educational Supplement was fulsome: "As native as a Whitstable oyster, as sharp an expression of contemporary thought and experience as anything written in our time, as immediate in its appeal as the lyric poetry of an earlier day, it may well be regarded by posterity as a poetic monument that marks the triumph over the formless mystifications of the last twenty years. With Larkin poetry is on its way back to the middlebrow public." Reviewing the book in America, the poet Robert Lowell wrote: "No post-war poetry has so caught the moment, and caught it without straining after its ephemera. It's a hesitant, groping mumble, resolutely experienced, resolutely perfect in its artistic methods."

In time, there was a counter-reaction: David Wright wrote in Encounter that The Less Deceived suffered from the "palsy of playing safe". In April 1957, Charles Tomlinson wrote a piece for the journal Essays in Criticism, "The Middlebrow Muse", attacking The Movement's poets for their "middle-cum-lowbrowism", "suburban mental ratio" and "parochialism"—Larkin had a "tenderly nursed sense of defeat". In 1962, A. Alvarez, the compiler of an anthology entitled The New Poetry, accused Larkin of "gentility, neo-Georgian pastoralism, and a failure to deal with the violent extremes of contemporary life".

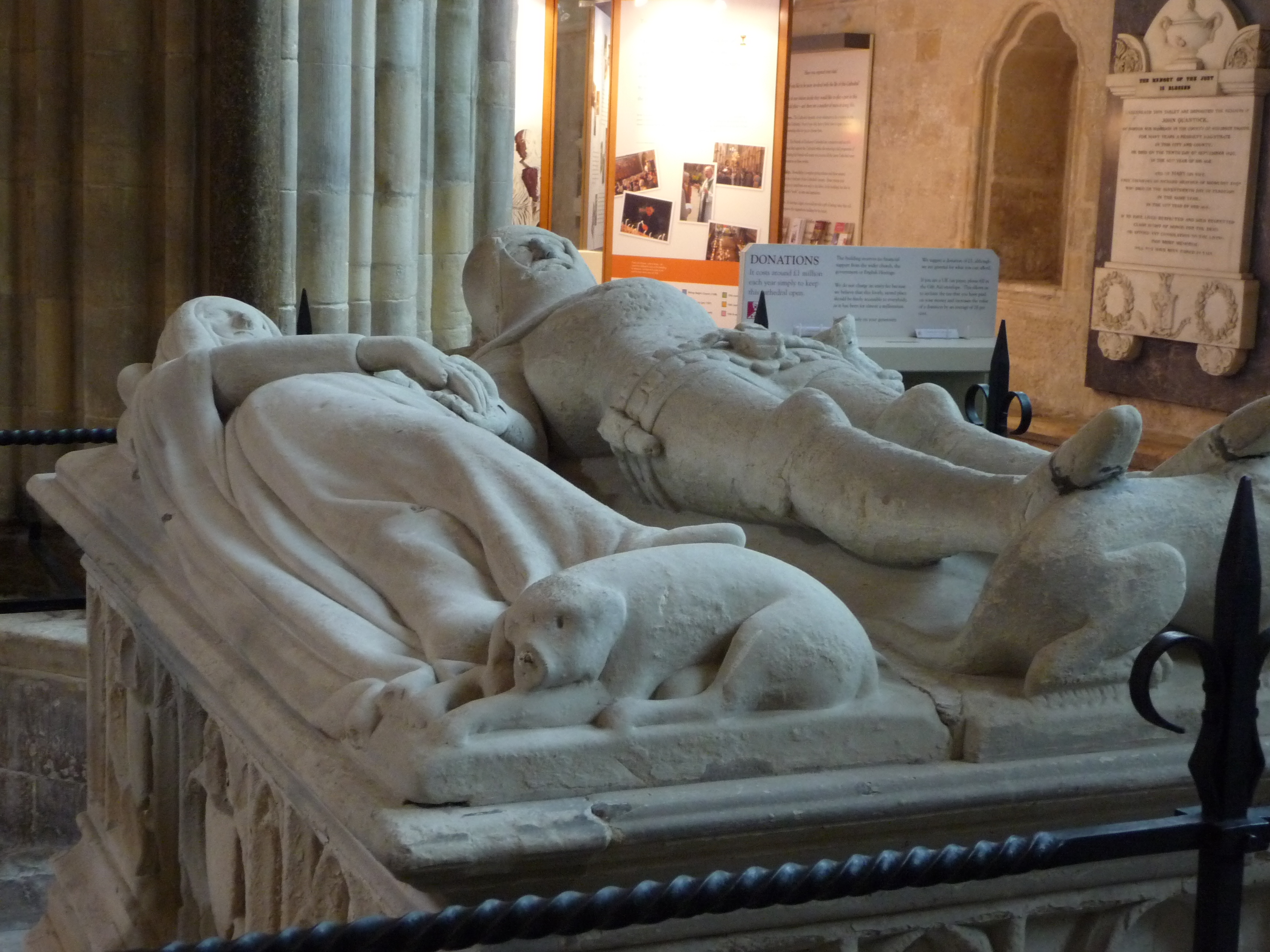
This tomb in Chichester Cathedral of the Earl of Arundel and his wife Eleanor of Lancaster was the inspiration for Larkin's poem "An Arundel Tomb"

When The Whitsun Weddings was released, Alvarez continued his attacks in a review in The Observer, complaining of the "drab circumspection" of Larkin's "commonplace" subject-matter. Praise outweighed criticism; John Betjeman felt Larkin had "closed the gap between poetry and the public which the experiments and obscurity of the last fifty years have done so much to widen." In The New York Review of Books, Christopher Ricks wrote of the "refinement of self-consciousness, usually flawless in its execution" and Larkin's summoning up of "the world of all of us, the place where, in the end, we find our happiness, or not at all." He felt Larkin to be "the best poet England now has."

In his biography, Richard Bradford writes that the reviews for High Windows showed "genuine admiration" but notes that they typically encountered problems describing "the individual genius at work" in poems such as "Annus Mirabilis", "The Explosion" and "The Building" while also explaining why each were "so radically different" from one another. Robert Nye in The Times overcame this problem "by treating the differences as ineffective masks for a consistently nasty presence".

In Larkin at Sixty, amongst the portraits by friends and colleagues such as Kingsley Amis, Noel Hughes and Charles Monteith and dedicatory poems by John Betjeman, Peter Porter and Gavin Ewart, the various strands of Larkin's output were analysed by critics and fellow poets: Andrew Motion, Christopher Ricks and Seamus Heaney looked at the poems, Alan Brownjohn wrote on the novels, and Donald Mitchell and Clive James looked at his jazz criticism.

=== Critical opinion ===
Isolate rather this element
That spreads through other lives like a tree
And sways them on in a sort of sense
And say why it never worked for me

— from "Love Again" (1974), posthumously published

In 1980, Neil Powell wrote: "It is probably fair to say that Philip Larkin is less highly regarded in academic circles than either Thom Gunn or Donald Davie". But since the turn of the century, Larkin's standing has increased. "Philip Larkin is an excellent example of the plain style in modern times", writes Tijana Stojkovic. Robert Sheppard asserts: "It is by general consent that the work of Philip Larkin is taken to be exemplary". "Larkin is the most widely celebrated and arguably the finest poet of the Movement", states Keith Tuma, and his poetry is "more various than its reputation for dour pessimism and anecdotes of a disappointed middle class suggests".

Stephen Cooper's Philip Larkin: Subversive Writer and John Osborne's "Larkin, Ideology and Critical Violence" suggest the changing temper of Larkin studies, the latter attacking eminent critics such as James Booth and Anthony Thwaite for their readiness to reduce the poems to works of biography, and stressing instead the genius of Larkin's universality and deconstructionism. Cooper argues that "The interplay of signs and motifs in the early work orchestrates a subversion of conventional attitudes towards class, gender, authority and sexual relations". Cooper identifies Larkin as a progressive writer, and perceives in the letters a "plea for alternative constructs of masculinity, femininity and social and political organisation". Cooper draws on the entire canon of Larkin's works, as well as on unpublished correspondence, to counter the image of Larkin as merely a racist, misogynist reactionary. Instead he identifies in Larkin what he calls a "subversive imagination". He highlights in particular "Larkin's objections to the hypocrisies of conventional sexual politics that hamper the lives of both sexes in equal measure".

In similar vein to Cooper, Stephen Regan notes in an essay entitled "Philip Larkin: a late modern poet" that Larkin frequently embraces devices associated with the experimental practices of Modernism, such as "linguistic strangeness, self-conscious literariness, radical self-questioning, sudden shifts of voice and register, complex viewpoints and perspectives, and symbolist intensity".

A further indication of a new direction in the critical valuation of Larkin is Sisir Kumar Chatterjee's statement that "Larkin is no longer just a name but an institution, a modern British national cultural monument".

Chatterjee's view of Larkin is grounded in a detailed analysis of his poetic style. He observes a development from Larkin's early works to his later ones, which sees his style change from "verbal opulence through a recognition of the self-ironising and self-negating potentiality of language to a linguistic domain where the conventionally held conceptual incompatibles – which are traditional binary oppositions between absolutes and relatives, between abstracts and concretes, between fallings and risings and between singleness and multiplicity – are found to be the last stumbling-block for an artist aspiring to rise above the impasse of worldliness". This contrasts with an older view that Larkin's style barely changed over the course of his poetic career. Chatterjee identifies this view as being typified by Bernard Bergonzi's comment that "Larkin's poetry did not ... develop between 1955 and 1974". For Chatterjee, Larkin's poetry responds strongly to changing "economic, socio-political, literary and cultural factors".

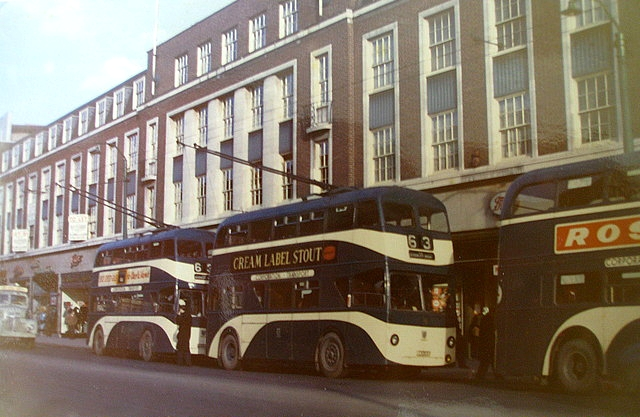
S. K. Chatterjee talks of Larkin's responsiveness to economic, socio-political and cultural factors. In "Here" Larkin writes of "residents from raw estates, brought down / The dead straight miles by stealing flat-faced trolleys".

Chatterjee argues: "It is under the defeatist veneer of his poetry that the positive side of Larkin's vision of life is hidden". This positivity, suggests Chatterjee, is most apparent in his later works. Over the course of Larkin's poetic career: "The most notable attitudinal development lay in the zone of his view of life, which from being almost irredeemably bleak and pessimistic in The North Ship, became more and more positive with the passage of time".

The view that Larkin is not a nihilist or pessimist, but actually displays optimism in his works, is certainly not universally endorsed, but Chatterjee's study suggests the degree to which old stereotypes of Larkin are now being transcended. Representative of these stereotypes is Bryan Appleyard's judgement (quoted by Maeve Brennan) that of the writers who "have adopted a personal pose of extreme pessimism and loathing of the world ... none has done so with quite such a grinding focus on littleness and triviality as Larkin the man". Recent criticism of Larkin demonstrates a more complex set of values at work in his poetry and across the totality of his writings.

The debate about Larkin is summed up by Matthew Johnson, who observes that in most evaluations of Larkin "one is not really discussing the man, but actually reading a coded and implicit discussion of the supposed values of 'Englishness' that he is held to represent". Changing attitudes to Englishness are reflected in changing attitudes to Larkin, and the more sustained intellectual interest in the English national character, as embodied in the works of Peter Mandler for instance, pinpoint one key reason why there is an increased scholarly interest in Larkin.

A summative view similar to those of Johnson and Regan is that of Robert Crawford, who argues that "In various ways, Larkin's work depends on, and develops from, Modernism." Furthermore, he "demonstrates just how slippery the word 'English' is".

Despite these recent developments, Larkin and his circle are nonetheless still firmly rejected by modernist critics and poets. For example, the poet Andrew Duncan, writing of The Movement on his pinko.org website, is of the opinion that "there now seems to be a very wide consensus that it was a bad thing, and that Movement poems are tedious, shallow, smug, sententious, emotionally dead, etc. Their successors in the mainstream retain most of these characteristics. Wolfgang Gortschacher's book on Little Magazine Profiles ... shows ... that there was a terrific dearth of magazines during the 50s—an impoverishment of openings which correlates with rigid and conservative poetry, and with the hegemony of a few people determined to exclude dissidents."

Peter Riley, a participant in the British Poetry Revival, which was a reaction against The Movement's poets, has also criticised Larkin for his uncritical and ideologically narrow position: "What after all were Larkin and The Movement but a denial of the effusive ethics of poetry from 1795 onwards, in favour of 'This is what life is really like' as if anyone thought for a second of representing observable 'life'. W.S. Graham and Dylan Thomas knew perfectly well that 'life' was like that, if you nominated it thus, which is why they went elsewhere."

=== Posthumous reputation ===
Larkin's posthumous reputation was deeply affected by the publication in 1992 of Anthony Thwaite's edition of his letters and, the following year, his official biography, Philip Larkin: A Writer's Life by Andrew Motion. These revealed his obsession with pornography, his racism, his increasing shift to the political right wing, and his habitual expressions of venom and spleen. In 1990, even before the publication of these two books, Tom Paulin wrote that Larkin's "obscenity is informed by prejudices that are not by any means as ordinary, commonplace, or acceptable as the poetic language in which they are so plainly spelled out."

The letters and Motion's biography fuelled further assessments of this kind, such as Lisa Jardine's comment in The Guardian that "The Britishness of Larkin's poetry carries a baggage of attitudes which the Selected Letters now make explicit". On the other hand, the revelations were dismissed by the novelist Martin Amis in The War Against Cliché, arguing that the letters in particular show nothing more than a tendency for Larkin to tailor his words according to the recipient. A similar argument was made by Richard Bradford in his biography on Larkin from 2005. Commenting on Letters to Monica (2010) Graeme Richardson states that the collection went "some way towards the restoration of Larkin's tarnished image...reveal(ing) Larkin as not quite the sinister, black-hearted near-rapist everyone thought it was OK to abuse in the 90s."

Trying to resolve Larkin's contradictory opinions on race in his book Such Deliberate Disguises: The Art of Philip Larkin, the writer Richard Palmer quotes a letter Larkin wrote to Betjeman, as if it exposes "all the post-Motion and post-Letters furore about Larkin's 'racism' as the nonsense it is":

The American Negro is trying to take a step forward that can be compared only to the ending of slavery in the nineteenth century. And despite the dogs, the hosepipes and the burnings, advances have already been made towards giving the Negro his civil rights that would have been inconceivable when Louis Armstrong was a young man. These advances will doubtless continue. They will end only when the Negro is as well-housed, educated and medically cared for as the white man.

Reviewing Palmer's book, John G. Rodwan, Jr. proposes that:

a less forgiving reader could counter by asking if this does not qualify as the thought of a "true racist":

I find the state of the nation quite terrifying. In 10 years' time we shall all be cowering under our beds as hordes of blacks steal anything they can lay their hands on.

Or this:

We don't go to cricket Test matches now, too many fucking niggers about.

Despite controversy about his personal life and opinions, Larkin remains one of Britain's most popular poets. In 2003, almost two decades after his death, Larkin was chosen as "the nation's best-loved poet" in a survey by the Poetry Book Society, and in 2008 The Times named Larkin as the greatest British post-war writer. Three of his poems, "This Be The Verse", "The Whitsun Weddings" and "An Arundel Tomb", featured in the Nation's Top 100 Poems as voted for by viewers of the BBC's Bookworm in 1995.

Media interest in Larkin has increased in the twenty-first century. Larkin's collection The Whitsun Weddings is one of the available poetry texts in the AQA English Literature A Level syllabus, while High Windows is offered by the OCR board. Buses in Hull displayed extracts from his poems in 2010.

The Centennial of Larkin's birth was celebrated in 2022.

=== Recordings ===
In everyone there sleeps
A sense of life lived according to love.
To some it means the difference they could make
By loving others, but across most it sweeps
As all they might have done had they been loved.

— from "Faith Healing" (1960), The Whitsun Weddings

In 1959, the Marvell Press published Listen presents Philip Larkin reading The Less Deceived (Listen LPV1), an LP record on which Larkin recites all the poems from The Less Deceived in the order they appear in the printed volume. This was followed, in 1965, by Philip Larkin reads and comments on The Whitsun Weddings (Listen LPV6), again on the Marvell Press's record label (though the printed volume was published by Faber and Faber). Once again the poems are read in the order in which they appear in the printed volume, but with Larkin including introductory remarks to many of the poems. A recording of Larkin reading the poems from his final collection, High Windows, was published in 1975 as British poets of our time. Philip Larkin; High Windows: poems read by the author (edited by Peter Orr) on the Argo record label (Argo PLP 1202). As with the two previous recordings, the sequencing of the poems is the same as in the printed volume.

Larkin also appears on several audio poetry anthologies: The Jupiter Anthology of 20th Century English Poetry – Part III (JUR 00A8), issued in 1963 and featuring "An Arundel Tomb" and "Mr Bleaney" (this same recording was issued in the United States in 1967 on the Folkways record label as Anthology of 20th Century English Poetry – Part III (FL9870)); The Poet Speaks record 8 (Argo PLP 1088), issued in 1967 and featuring "Wants", "Coming", "Nothing to be Said", "Days" and "Dockery and Son"; On Record (YA3), issued in 1974 by Yorkshire Arts Association and featuring "Here", "Days", "Next, Please", "Wedding-Wind", "The Whitsun Weddings", "XXX", "XIII" (these last two poems from The North Ship); and Douglas Dunn and Philip Larkin, issued in 1984 by Faber and Faber (A Faber Poetry cassette), featuring Larkin reading 13 poems including, for the first time on a recording, "Aubade".

Despite the fact that Larkin made audio recordings (in studio conditions) of each of his three mature collections, and separate recordings of groups of poems for a number of audio anthologies, he somehow gained a reputation as a poet who was reluctant to make recordings in which he read his own work. While Larkin did express a dislike of the sound of his own voice ("I come from Coventry, between the sloppiness of Leicester and the whine of Birmingham, you know—and sometimes it comes out"), the evidence indicates that this influenced more his preference not to give public readings of his own work, than his willingness to make audio recordings of his poems.

In 1980, Larkin was invited by the Poets' Audio Center, Washington, to record a selection of poems from the full range of his poetic output for publication on a Watershed Foundation cassette tape. The recording was made in February 1980 (at Larkin's own expense) by John Weeks, a sound engineer colleague from the University of Hull. Although negotiations between Larkin, his publishers and the Watershed Foundation collapsed, the recording (of Larkin reading 26 poems selected from his four canonical volumes of poetry) was sold – by Larkin – to Harvard University's Poetry Room in 1981.

In 2004, a copy of this recording was uncovered in the Hornsea garage studio of the engineer who had made the recording for Larkin. (Subsequently, Larkin's own copy of the recording was found in the Larkin Archive at the University of Hull.) News of the "newly discovered" recording made the headlines in 2006, with extracts being broadcast in a Sky News report. A programme examining the discovery in more depth, The Larkin Tapes, was broadcast on BBC Radio 4 in March 2008. The recordings were issued on CD by Faber and Faber in January 2009 as The Sunday Sessions.

In contrast to the number of audio recordings of Larkin reading his own work, there are very few appearances by Larkin on television. The only programme in which he agreed to be filmed taking part is Down Cemetery Road (1964), from the BBC Monitor series, in which Larkin was interviewed by John Betjeman. The filming took place in and around Hull (with some filming in North Lincolnshire), and showed Larkin in his natural surroundings: his flat in Pearson Park, the Brynmor Jones Library; and visiting churches and cemeteries. The film was broadcast on BBC Four. In 1981, Larkin was part of a group of poets who surprised John Betjeman on his seventy-fifth birthday by turning up on his doorstep with gifts and greetings. This scene was filmed by Jonathan Stedall and later featured in the third episode of his 1983 series for BBC2, Time with Betjeman.

In 1982, as part of the celebrations for his sixtieth birthday, Larkin was the subject of The South Bank Show. Although Larkin declined the invitation to appear in the programme, he recorded (on audio tape) "a lot of poems" specifically for it. Melvyn Bragg commented, in his introduction to the programme, that the poet had given his full cooperation. The programme, broadcast on 30 May, featured contributions from Kingsley Amis, Andrew Motion and Alan Bennett. Bennett was also filmed reading several Larkin poems a few years later, in an edition of Poetry in Motion, broadcast by Channel 4 in 1990.

=== Fiction based on Larkin's life ===
In 1999, Oliver Ford Davies starred in Ben Brown's play Larkin with Women at the Stephen Joseph Theatre, Scarborough, reprising his role at the Orange Tree Theatre, London, in 2006. The play was published by Larkin's usual publishers, Faber and Faber. Set in the three decades after Larkin's arrival in Hull, it explores his long relationships with Monica Jones, Maeve Brennan and Betty Mackereth. Another Larkin-inspired entertainment, devised by and starring Sir Tom Courtenay, was given a pre-production performance in June 2002 at Hull University's Middleton Hall. Courtenay performed his one-man play Pretending to Be Me as part of the Second Hull International Conference on the Work of Philip Larkin.

In November that year, Courtenay debuted the play at the West Yorkshire Playhouse, later transferring the production to the Comedy Theatre in London's West End. An audio recording of the play, which is based on Larkin's letters, interviews, diaries and verse, was released in 2005. In June 2010, Courtenay returned to the University of Hull to give a performance of a newly revised version of Pretending to Be Me called Larkin Revisited in aid of the Larkin statue appeal as part of the Larkin 25 festival.

In July 2003, BBC Two broadcast a film entitled Love Again—its title also that of one of Larkin's most painfully personal poems—dealing with the last thirty years of Larkin's life (though not shot anywhere near Hull). The lead role was played by Hugh Bonneville, and in the same year Channel 4 broadcast the documentary Philip Larkin, Love and Death in Hull.

In April 2008, BBC Radio 4 broadcast a play by Chris Harrald entitled Mr Larkin's Awkward Day, recounting the practical joke played on him in 1957 by his friend Robert Conquest, a fellow poet.

=== Philip Larkin Society ===
The Philip Larkin Society is a charitable organization dedicated to preserving the memory and works of Philip Larkin. It was formed in 1995 on the tenth anniversary of Larkin's death, and achieved charity status in the United Kingdom in 2000. Anthony Thwaite, one of Larkin's literary executors, was the society's president until his death in 2021. Professor James Booth is an Honorary Vice-president and Honorary Life Member, as was Professor Eddie Dawes, the society's inaugural Chair. The current Society president is Rosie Millard OBE. The Society's Chair is Graham Chesters and deputy chair is Lyn Lockwood.

The society carries out various activities, such as lectures, walking tours and events for Larkin and his literary contemporaries. It hosted the Larkin 25 art festival from June to December 2010 to commemorate the 25th anniversary of Larkin's death, and in 2016 unveiled Larkin's memorial stone at Poet's Corner in Westminster Abbey, which includes lines from An Arundel Tomb: "Our almost-instinct almost true / What will survive of us is love".

== Memorials ==
Memorials to Larkin in Kingston upon Hull, where he worked and wrote much of his poetry, are the Larkin Building at the University of Hull housing teaching facilities and lecture rooms and the Philip Larkin Centre for Poetry and Creative Writing which hosts a regular programme of literary events.

In May 2022 Larkin's childhood school, King Henry VIII School, dedicated a memorial room, called 'The Philip Larkin Room', next to the main school hall, otherwise known as Burgess Hall.

In 2010, the city marked the 25th anniversary of his death with the Larkin 25 Festival. A video was commissioned to illustrate Larkin's poem "Here", his hymn to Hull and the East Riding of Yorkshire. Forty decorated toad sculptures entitled "Larkin with Toads" were displayed in the city in tribute to Larkin's poem "Toads" on 17 July 2010. A larger-than-life-size bronze statue of Larkin by sculptor Martin Jennings was unveiled at Hull Paragon Interchange in December 2010, closing the Larkin 25 events. It is inscribed, "That Whitsun I was late getting away", from the poem, The Whitsun Weddings.

Funding for the £100,000 statue, designed by Martin Jennings, was raised at charity events and auctions with support from Hull City Council. The unveiling was accompanied by Nathaniel Seaman's Fanfare for Larkin, composed for the occasion. Five plaques containing Larkin's poems were added to the floor near the statue in 2011. In December 2012, a memorial bench was installed around a pillar near the statue.

In June 2015, it was announced that Larkin would be honoured with a floor stone memorial at Poets' Corner in Westminster Abbey. The memorial was unveiled on 2 December 2016, the 31st anniversary of his death. Actor Sir Tom Courtenay and artist Grayson Perry both read from Larkin's work during the unveiling ceremony and an address was given by poet and author Blake Morrison. The memorial includes two lines quoted from his poem "An Arundel Tomb":

Our almost-instinct almost true:
What will survive of us is love.

From 5 July to 1 October 2017, as part of the Hull UK City of Culture 2017 celebrations, the Brynmor Jones Library at Hull University mounted the exhibition "Larkin: New Eyes Each Year". It featured objects from Larkin's life, as well as his personal collection of books from his last home at Newland Park, in the original shelf order in which he had arranged them. Also in 2017, in the Burgess district of Coventry, the pub known as The Tudor Rose was renamed The Philip Larkin.

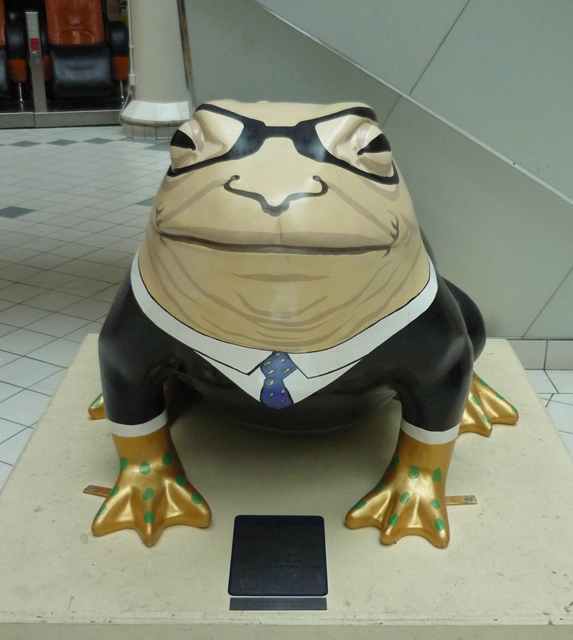
Sculpture of Larkin as a toad, displayed during the Larkin 25 Festival in 2010, Kingston upon Hull

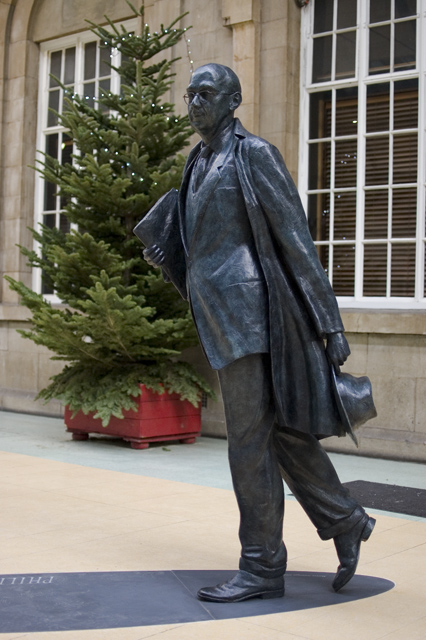
Bronze statue of Larkin by sculptor Martin Jennings, at Hull Paragon Interchange

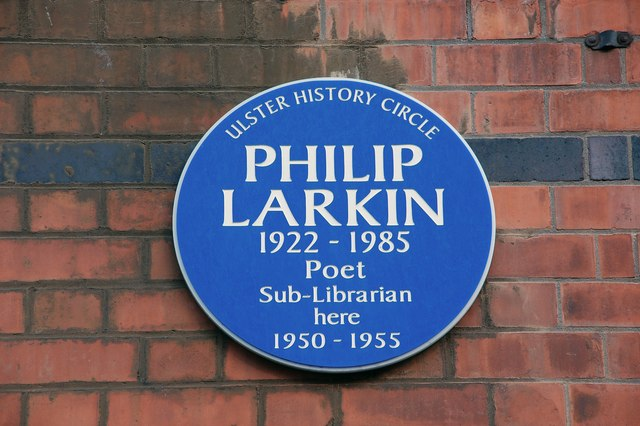
Blue plaque at Queen's University Belfast

== List of works ==
=== Poetry ===
- The North Ship. The Fortune Press. 1945. OCLC 2947142.
- XX Poems. Privately Printed. 1951. OCLC 6815116.
- The Less Deceived. The Marvell Press. 1955. OCLC 1273719.
  - "Church Going"
  - "Toads"
  - "Maiden Name"
  - "Born Yesterday" (written for the birth of Sally Amis)
  - "Lines on a Young Lady's Photograph Album"
- The Whitsun Weddings. Faber and Faber. 1964. OCLC 17300.
  - "The Whitsun Weddings"
  - "An Arundel Tomb"
  - "A Study of Reading Habits"
  - "Home is So Sad"
  - "Mr Bleaney"
- High Windows. Faber and Faber. 1974. ISBN 978-0-571-11451-1.
  - "This Be The Verse"
  - "Annus Mirabilis"
  - "The Explosion"
  - "The Building"
  - "High Windows"
- Thwaite, Anthony, ed. (1988). Collected Poems. Faber and Faber. ISBN 978-0-571-15386-2.
  - "Aubade" (first published 1977)
  - "Party Politics" (last published poem)
  - "The Dance" (unfinished & unpublished)
  - "Love Again" (unpublished)
- Thwaite, Anthony, ed. (2003). Collected Poems. Faber and Faber. ISBN 978-0-571-21654-3.
  - The North Ship
  - The Less Deceived
  - The Whitsun Weddings
  - High Windows
  - Two appendices of all other published poems, including XX Poems
- Burnett, Archie, ed. (2012), The Complete Poems, Faber and Faber, ISBN 978-0-571-24006-7

=== Fiction ===
- Jill. The Fortune Press. 1946. OCLC 3073127.
- A Girl in Winter. Faber and Faber. 1947. OCLC 12698134.
- James Booth, ed. (2002). "Trouble at Willow Gables" and Other Fiction 1943–1953. Faber and Faber. ISBN 0-571-20347-7.

=== Non-fiction ===
- All What Jazz: A Record Diary 1961–1971. Faber and Faber. 1985. ISBN 978-0-571-13476-2.
- Required Writing: Miscellaneous Pieces 1955–1982. Faber and Faber. 1983. ISBN 978-0-571-13120-4.
- Further Requirements: Interviews, Broadcasts, Statements and Book Reviews 1952–1985. Faber and Faber. 2001. ISBN 978-0-571-21614-7.
- Larkin, Philip (1987). "The Brynmor Jones Library 1929–1979". In Brennan, Maeve (ed.). 'A Lifted Study-Storehouse': The Brynmor Jones Library 1929–1979, updated to 1985. Hull University Press. ISBN 0-85958-561-1.
- Larkin, Philip, ed. (1973). The Oxford Book of Twentieth Century English Verse. Oxford University Press. ISBN 978-0-19-812137-4.
- Thwaite, Anthony, ed. (1992). Selected Letters of Philip Larkin, 1940–1985. Faber and Faber. ISBN 0-571-17048-X.
- Thwaite, Anthony, ed. (2010). Letters to Monica. Faber and Faber. ISBN 0-571-23909-9.
