= 32 Pearson Park, Hull =

Grade II listed building in Hull, England

Coordinates: 53°45′24.426″N 0°21′23.890″W

32 Pearson Park is a grade II listed building in Hull. The semi-detached house is notable for its connection with the poet Philip Larkin who lived in the top flat.

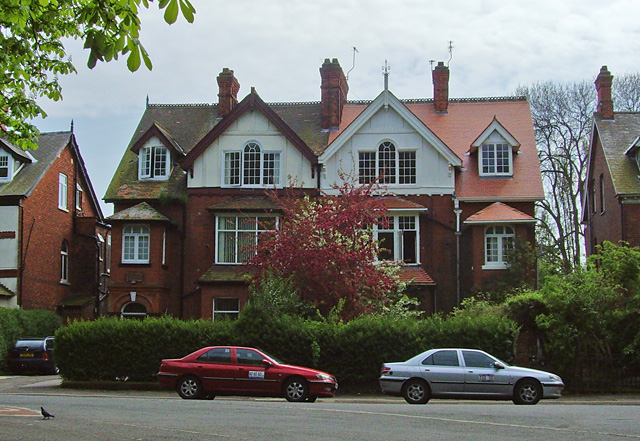
No 32 is the house on the right

During the 1950s, when Larkin moved to Hull, the house belonged to the University of Hull, his employer. The top flat at No. 32 was Larkin´s home for 18 years from 1956. It overlooks Pearson Park and its views may have inspired the poetry collection "High Windows". Larkin moved out in the 1970s when the university decided to sell the property.

== Conservation ==
Despite having been in shared occupancy, the house retains its late-19th-century appearance. Historic England mentions its "Queen Anne detailing" (referring to Queen Anne Revival architecture ). It was granted Grade II listed status in 2017, in part for its literary connection.

The house is within a Conservation Area, "Avenues and Pearson Park".

== Civic/cultural framing ==
The Avenues and Pearson Park Residents Association has installed a series of green plaques in the area to mark where famous residents lived. There is a plaque in honour of Larkin and another in honour of Dorothy L. Sayers.

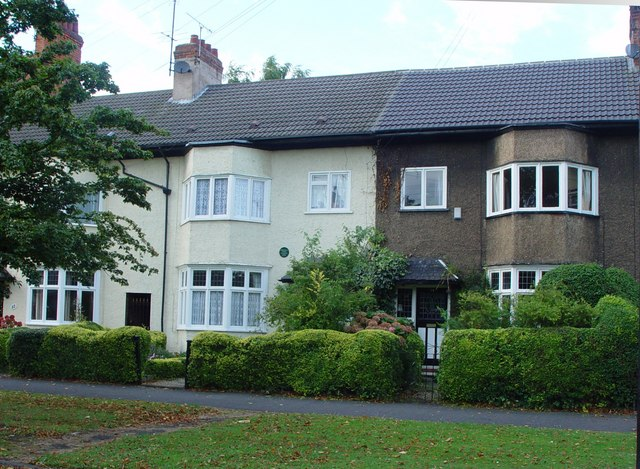
A small plaque to Dorothy L. Sayers

Pearson Park is featured in a Philip Larkin Trail, which frames sites in Hull connected to the poet.
