= Relationships that influenced Philip Larkin =

Important roles which were significant influences on the poet

Throughout the life of the poet Philip Larkin, multiple women had important roles which were significant influences on his poetry. Since Larkin's death in 1985, biographers have highlighted the importance of female relationships on Larkin: when Andrew Motion's biography was serialised in The Independent in 1993, the second installment of extracts was dedicated to the topic. In 1999, Ben Brown's play Larkin with Women dramatised Larkin's relationships with three of his lovers, and more recently writers such as Martin Amis, continued to comment on this subject.

Amis is the son of the British novelist, and Larkin's long-standing friend, Kingsley Amis. While primarily a novelist, Amis also wrote more than six volumes of poetry. Biographer Richard Bradford contends that, over the course of Larkin's life, his relationship with Amis transformed from one of mutual appreciation and encouragement, to a much more fraught dynamic. Bradford has stated that in the later years of their relationship Larkin "was subterraneously driven by resentment and near hatred" of Amis.

== Eva Larkin ==
Eva Larkin was Philip Larkin's mother. Born in 1886, she lived until 1977, dying 29 years after her domineering husband, Sydney Larkin. Larkin is often considered to have had a tense relationship with his parents; mainly due to his lyric poem "This Be The Verse" beginning with the line "They fuck you up, your mum and dad". However, mother and son wrote to each other twice weekly for about 35 years from 1940, when Larkin went to Oxford University. The writer Philip Pullen has described these letters as "very significant" and proof that "the relationship was deeper and more valuable to Larkin than anybody might have thought".

"Reference Back" from The Whitsun Weddings, is a poem written from his mother's viewpoint or his imagination of it.

== Ruth Bowman ==
Ruth Bowman was a schoolgirl living in Wellington, Shropshire when Larkin moved there in 1943 to become librarian at the public library. They met the following year when she came into the library. She was 16, an academically-minded schoolgirl, and the person with whom Larkin had his first sexual encounter a year later when he visited her at King's College London. Their relationship continued and in 1948 they became engaged. The engagement was broken in 1950, shortly before Larkin moved to Northern Ireland. These events are referred to sardonically in the poem "Wild Oats", written in the early 1960s. She died in 2012, at the age of 85.

== Monica Jones ==
Monica Jones was born Margaret Monica Beale Jones on 7 May 1922 in Llanelli, South Wales. She moved with her family to Stourport-on-Severn, Worcestershire, when aged seven. Educated at Kidderminster High School for Girls, she won a scholarship to study English at Oxford University, a period of her life which was immensely influential to her; she acquired her distinctive accent and flamboyant dress sense whilst studying there.

Larkin's long and extremely close relationship with Monica Jones dated from the autumn of 1946, when they met at Leicester University College. Jones had been appointed as an assistant lecturer in English in January 1946 and Larkin arrived in September, as an assistant librarian. "Both had been at Oxford (he at St John's, she at St Hugh's), between 1940 and 1943, but had not met. Both had first class degrees in English. They had been born in the same year, 1922, and came from rather similar provincial middle-class backgrounds." For the first few years of the relationship, Larkin was involved with Ruth Bowman, but when Bowman broke off the engagement, "Monica quickly became central to Larkin's attention." Jones had a holiday cottage at Haydon Bridge where she and Larkin spent many summers together. He left the bulk of his estate to her when he died in 1985. She died on 15 February 2001.

Jones taught at Leicester University from 1946 until 1981 when she retired. She never published anything during her academic career; she "regarded publishing as a bit showy", though she was noted for "the panache of her lecturing, in which, for example, she would wear a Scottish tartan when talking about Macbeth." Her literary enthusiasms (not entirely shared by Larkin) included Walter Scott, Jane Austen and George Crabbe. They shared enthusiasm for Thomas Hardy and Barbara Pym, and swapped scornful opinions of C. P. Snow, Pamela Hansford Johnson, William Cooper and others. They shared a sympathy with animals: both of them deplored vivisection and myxomatosis, were fond of Beatrix Potter's creations, and of real creatures, in particular cats and rabbits, though Monica Jones had a fear of hens, and of some other birds. Larkin's letters to Jones were sometimes "embellished with [his] skilful sketches", Jones as a rabbit ("Dearest bun"), himself as a seal.

There is evidence that Jones gave Larkin editorial advice on his writing. A copy of Jill he inscribed to her to thank her for making it "decent, ie literate"'. Anna Farthing, a curator of a 2017 exhibition in Hull, told The Guardian: "All the evidence suggests he sends her drafts of his work, he’s constantly asking for her opinion."

In October 1982, Jones was taken to Hexham Hospital after a fall downstairs in her Haydon Bridge cottage. At Easter 1983, she was stricken with shingles and on leaving hospital this time Larkin, "offered her shelter and care in his house in Newland Park, Hull." Following his death, in December 1985, "Monica hardly left that house in Hull until her own death in February 2001."

She is said to be the model for the character of Margaret Peel, Jim Dixon's manipulative on-again-off-again girlfriend, in Kingsley Amis's novel Lucky Jim (1954). Monica Jones may also be the inspiration for the character Elvira Jones in Robert Conquest's 1955 novel A World of Difference. The book contains other "Larkinesque" references, including a spaceship named after the poet. She has also been suggested as the model for Viola Masefield in Malcolm Bradbury's first novel, Eating People is Wrong.

Monica Jones, Philip Larkin and Me, a 2021 book by Jones' friend John Sutherland reveals that Jones and Larkin sent each other many letters containing racist and anti-semitic opinions.

As with Larkin and another of his long term companions Maeve Brennan, Monica Jones was buried in Cottingham Cemetery near Hull. Her white headstone is of identical design to the one situated at Larkin's grave.

== Winifred Arnott ==
Winifred Arnott was a young colleague of Larkin at Queen's University, Belfast (QUB). They became close friends but she soon became engaged to her boyfriend and withdrew from the friendship to a degree. Larkin wrote the poem "Lines on a Young Lady's Photograph Album" about her, and also "Maiden Name". Both appeared in Larkin's 1955 collection The Less Deceived.

== Patsy Murphy ==
Larkin knew Patricia Avis Strang Murphy (1928–1977) during the 1950s, and wrote her his first love letters. At the time, she was married to Colin Strang, a friend of Larkin's and a lecturer in the Philosophy department at Queen's University, Belfast, where Larkin was under-librarian. She became pregnant by Larkin, but miscarried. As Patricia Avis, she is the author of Playing the Harlot (1996, Virago), a roman à clef; the character of Rollo Jute is thought to have been inspired by Larkin.

Patsy Strang discovered and read some of Larkin's sexual diaries. She later married the poet Richard Murphy.

== Maeve Brennan ==
Maeve Brennan (27 September 1929 – 11 June 2003) was born in Beverley, East Yorkshire and was the eldest of three children. Brennan's father was a dental surgeon from Kilkenny, Ireland. Brennan attended Saint Mary's high school for girls in Hull. She had a successful academic career there, becoming head girl, a title she shared with Ruth Bowman and Winifred Arnott, both previous companions of Larkin.

Brennan was a colleague of Larkin's at Hull University, from which she graduated with a degree in history, French and English. They first met in 1955 when he moved from Belfast to Hull, but it was in 1960, when Larkin coached her for a Library Association exam, that their relationship became meaningful and romantic. This happened despite Larkin's deep and by then long-standing relationship with Monica Jones. The romance between the two lasted for eighteen years, while their friendship as a whole spanned nearly three decades. Larkin's longest poem, "The Dance" is about an evening spent with Brennan. "The Dance" remains unfinished. The poem "Broadcast" was also written about her. "Broadcast" sees Larkin listening to a live transmission of a concert from Hull's City Hall where Brennan was seated in the audience. Much of Larkin's writing was heavily influenced by his relationship with Brennan, including his collection The Whitsun Weddings, which he once described as Brennan's book.

Brennan and Larkin's relationship is detailed extensively by Brennan herself in The Philip Larkin I Knew, which was published in 2002. Brennan's book speaks of both the friendship and romantic relationship that existed between her and Larkin, as well as recalling the poet's 30 year tenure of office as librarian of the University of Hull. Brennan aimed for the book to show Larkin in a new light: namely, that the poet was "considerably more compassionate, generous and warmhearted than autobiographical, biographical and critical works published since his death have revealed". The Philip Larkin I Knew includes a significant collection of letters between Brennan and Larkin, despite many from the last six months of Larkin's life having been previously destroyed. Brennan also advised on the BBC2 drama, Love Again, which is based on the last 30 years of Larkin's life, as well as contributing to the Channel 4 documentary Philip Larkin: Love and Death in Hull.

Brennan died in June 2003 following a short illness, and like both Larkin and Monica Jones, she is buried in Cottingham Cemetery. Her grave is situated approximately 20 metres from that of Monica Jones and the epitaph on its red granite headstone comes from one of Larkin's best known poems, "An Arundel Tomb": "What will survive of us is love".

== Betty Mackereth ==
Betty Mackereth (born 27 June 1924, in Hull - 20 November 2025) was Larkin's "loaf-haired" secretary for most of his time at Hull University, joining the staff in that role in 1957. After his death, it was she who, on his wishes, destroyed his diaries, feeding them sheet by sheet into a university shredder. They began an affair in 1975, when they were both in their fifties. She knew about both Monica Jones and Maeve Brennan, and also about Larkin's large collection of pornography. In 2002, a poem written to her, "We Met at the End of the Party", was publicised by her, prompted by the discovery of a notebook which contained its opening lines. As depicted in Larkin's little drawings sometimes added to letters Mackereth appeared as a whale – Monica Jones was a rabbit and Maeve Brennan a mouse.
