= The Less Deceived =

Poetry collection by Philip Larkin

- First edition
- Author: Philip Larkin
- Language: English
- Genre: Poetry
- Publisher: The Marvell Press
- Publication place: United Kingdom
- English publication date: 1955
- Preceded by: The North Ship
- Followed by: The Whitsun Weddings

The Less Deceived, first published in 1955, was Philip Larkin's first mature collection of poetry, having been preceded by the derivative North Ship (1945) from The Fortune Press and a privately printed collection, a small pamphlet titled XX Poems, which Larkin mailed to literary critics and authors. Larkin was unaware that postal rates had gone up, and most recipients, when asked to pay the difference for delivery of a pamphlet by a little-known writer, turned them away. Only around 100 copies were printed.

Despite this setback, 13 of the 20 poems, together with 16 new poems, were published to much acclaim in 1955 as The Less Deceived, which was selected as a book of the year by the Times Literary Supplement and immediately went through several impressions. Put out by The Marvell Press, a small operation run by George Hartley and his wife Jean Hartley in Hessle, East Yorkshire, the book through the depth of its appeal, the formal skill of its verse, and its consistent striking of Larkin's distinctive tone gained wide readership. By the end of 1955 The Less Deceived was recognized as one of the outstanding collections of the year.

== History ==
The first poem in it, chronologically, to be written was "Going," of February 1946. It is about death, and, according to Andrew Motion, is the kind of poem for which Larkin "is so often regarded as an unrelievedly pessimistic poet" Its concluding lines, "What is under my hands, / That I cannot feel? / What loads my hands down?", presage the helplessness, the dread of the atrophying of emotion, the despair, and the magnetic terror of death in the poems that follow. These are Larkin's most persistent themes.

Throughout the collection, the feeling of diminishment and loss is pervasive, whether in the visit of a cyclist to a church in the volume's best known poem, "Church Going," or in the alienation of the speaker looking at a photograph of a young lady, or in the man in "Toads" beaten by work into an imprisonment he then wills, or even in the "I" who "starts to be happy" when light strikes on the "foreheads" of houses. "Beneath it all," ends the poem "Wants," "desire of oblivion runs." This desire for death simultaneously horrifies and allures.

Philip Larkin said on more than one occasion that his discovery of Thomas Hardy's poetry was a turning point in the writing of his own poetry:

I don't think Hardy, as a poet, is a poet for young people. I know it sounds ridiculous to say I wasn't young at twenty-five or twenty-six, but at least I was beginning to find out what life was about, and that's precisely what I found in Hardy. In other words, I'm saying that what I like about him primarily is his temperament and the way he sees life. He's not a transcendental writer, he's not a Yeats, he's not an Eliot; his subjects are men, the life of men, time and the passing of time, love and the fading of love… When I came to Hardy it was with the sense of relief that I didn't have to try and jack myself up to a concept of poetry that lay outside my own life — this is perhaps what I felt Yeats was trying to make me do. One could simply relapse back into one's own life and write from it. Hardy taught one to feel rather than to write — of course one has to use one's own language and one's own jargon and one's own situations — and he taught one as well to have confidence in what one felt. I have come, I think, to admire him even more than I did then.

== Poems ==
- Lines on a Young Lady's Photograph Album
- Wedding-Wind
- Places, Loved Ones
- Coming
- Reasons for Attendance
- Dry-Point
- Next, Please
- Going
- Wants
- Maiden Name
- Born Yesterday
- Whatever Happened?
- No Road
- Wires
- Church Going
- Age
- Myxomatosis
- Toads
- Poetry of Departures
- Triple Time
- Spring
- Deceptions
- I Remember, I Remember
- Absences
- Latest Face
- If, My Darling
- Skin
- Arrivals, Departures
- At Grass

== See also ==
- List of poems by Philip Larkin
