= List of books about Oxford =

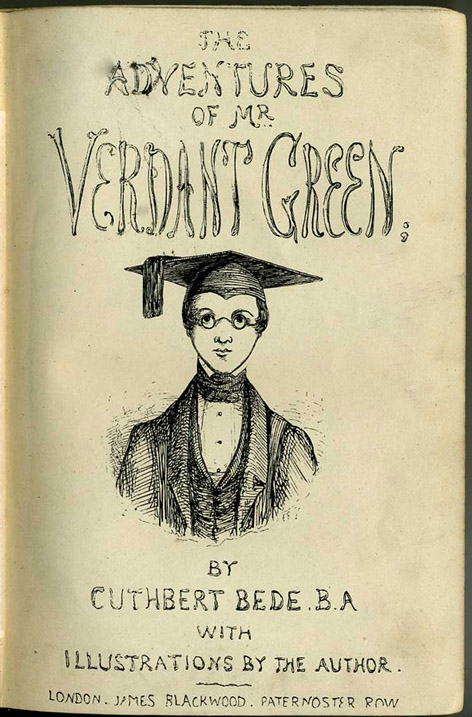
Title page from The Adventures of Mr Verdant Green by Cuthbert Bede.

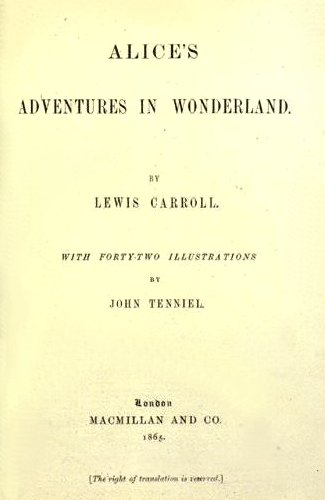
Title page from Alice's Adventures in Wonderland by Lewis Carroll

Below is a list of books about Oxford or written in Oxford, Oxfordshire, England. The city of Oxford has generated and inspired much literature. Many authors have lived in Oxford, especially associated with the University. It has also been a setting used in many books.

== Overview ==
The Oxford University Press (and Clarendon Press) is the university's own publishing house. It is world-renowned for its dictionaries as well as other books, largely academic in nature. It also publishes the Oxford World's Classics series. Other publishing companies based in the city include David Fickling Books, notable as the first bi-continental publisher of children's books.

Leading 20th-century authors at Oxford University include C. S. Lewis (works including The Chronicles of Narnia series of seven books) and J. R. R. Tolkien (works including Middle-earth books).

Inspector Morse is a detective book series based in Oxford, by Colin Dexter. It has spawned a successful television series. Other book series associated with Oxford include A Staircase in Surrey, a five-novel series, written between 1974 and 1978 by J. I. M. Stewart, and Kate Ivory by Veronica Stallwood. His Dark Materials and The Book of Dust are trilogies of fantasy novels started by Philip Pullman in 1995 and 2017 respectively.

== Timeline ==
Before 1900

- Reginald Dalton (John Gibson Lockhart, 1823)
- Loss and Gain (John Henry Newman, 1848)
- The Adventures of Mr. Verdant Green (Cuthbert M. Bede, in three parts: 1850s)
- Falconbeck Hall (John Berwick Harwood, 1854)
- The Old Parish Church: with the Ghost of Merton Hall (John Gibbs, 1861)
- Tom Brown at Oxford (Thomas Hughes, 1861)
- Alice's Adventures in Wonderland (Lewis Carroll, 1865)
- Through the Looking-Glass (Lewis Carroll, 1871)
- Cripps the Carrier (Richard Doddridge Blackmore, 1876) – author of Lorna Doone
- Robert Elsmere (Mrs Humphry Ward, 1888)
- Three Men in a Boat (Jerome K. Jerome, 1889) – a journey on the River Thames from Kingston to Oxford
- A Young Oxford Maid (Sarah Tytler, 1890)
- Jude the Obscure (Thomas Hardy, 1895) – Oxford is called "Christminster"

1900-1949

- A Clerk of Oxford (Evelyn Everett-Green, 1900)
- The Wind in the Willows (Kenneth Grahame, 1908) – Grahame is buried in Holywell Cemetery, Oxford, beside his son, for whom the book was written
- Zuleika Dobson (Max Beerbohm, 1911)
- Sinister Street (Compton Mackenzie, 1913–14)
- The Charm of Oxford (Joseph Wells, 1920) – Warden of Wadham College, Oxford
- Decline and Fall (Evelyn Waugh, 1928)
- The Oxford Murders ('Adam Broome' (Godfrey James), 1929)
- A Storm in Oxford (E. Tangye Lean, 1932)
- Testament of Youth (Vera Brittain, 1933)
- Death on the Cherwell (Mavis Doriel Hay, 1935)
- Gaudy Night (Dorothy L. Sayers, 1935)
- Death at the President's Lodging (Michael Innes, 1936)
- The Hobbit (J. R. R. Tolkien, 1937) – written at 20 Northmoor Road, North Oxford
- An Oxford University Chest (John Betjeman, 1938)
- Towers in the Mist (Elizabeth Goudge, 1938)
- Michaelmas Term at St Bride's (Philip Larkin, 1943)
- The Case of the Gilded Fly (Edmund Crispin, 1944)
- The Silent Traveller in Oxford (Chiang Yee, 1944)
- Brideshead Revisited (Evelyn Waugh, 1945)
- Folly Bridge: A Romantic Tale (David Leslie Murray, 1945)
- The Notion Club Papers (J. R. R. Tolkien, written 1945–46, published 1992) – written in Oxford and set there
- Jill (Philip Larkin, 1946)
- The Moving Toyshop (Edmund Crispin, 1946)

1950-89

- The Lion, the Witch and the Wardrobe (C. S. Lewis, 1950) – first book in The Chronicles of Narnia series
- The Lord of the Rings (J. R. R. Tolkien, three volumes: 1954–55; also film series) — mostly written at 20 Northmoor Road
- Landscape with Dead Dons (Robert Robinson, 1956)
- Summoned by Bells (John Betjeman, 1960) – verse autobiography
- Dame's Delight (Margaret Forster, 1964)
- Accident (Nicholas Mosley), 1965
- The Game (A. S. Byatt, 1967)
- Last Boat to Folly Bridge (Eric C. Hiscock, 1970)
- The House in Norham Gardens (Penelope Lively, 1974) – set in Norham Gardens, North Oxford
- A Staircase in Surrey (J. I. M. Stewart, 1974–78) – a five-novel series
- Last Bus to Woodstock (Colin Dexter, 1977) – first book in the Inspector Morse series
- The Alchemists (Margaret Doody, 1980)
- Death of a Don (Howard Shaw, 1981)
- The Book and the Brotherhood (Iris Murdoch, 1983)
- Oxford Blood (Antonia Fraser, 1985)
- Where the Rivers Meet (John Wain, 1988)

1990s

- Dirty Tricks (Michael Dibdin, 1991)
- The Children of Men (P. D. James, 1992)
- Doomsday Book (Connie Willis, 1992)
- The Men and the Girls (Joanna Trollope, 1992)
- Afternoon Raag (Amit Chaudhuri, 1993)
- Adrian Mole: The Wilderness Years (Sue Townsend, 1993)
- Dancing to the Pipers (Kate Fenton, 1993)
- Juggling (Barbara Trapido, 1994)
- His Dark Materials (Philip Pullman, trilogy: 1995, 1997, 2000)
- The Devil's Hunt (Paul Doherty, 1997)
- An Instance of the Fingerpost (Iain Pears, 1997)
- To Say Nothing of the Dog (Connie Willis, 1997)
- The Greatest Sorrow (Keith Ovenden, 1998)

2000s

- The Remorseful Day (Colin Dexter, 2000) – last book in the Inspector Morse series
- Another Kind of Cinderella (Angela Huth, 2002)
- Any Human Heart (William Boyd, 2002)
- Bleak Midwinter (Peter Millar, 2002)
- Lyra's Oxford (Philip Pullman, 2003)
- The Oxford Murders (Guillermo Martínez, 2003) – also a 2008 film
- Endymion Spring (Matthew Skelton, 2006)
- Restless (William Boyd, 2006)
- The September Society (Charles Finch, 2008)

2010s

- The Lessons (Naomi Alderman, 2010)
- A Discovery of Witches (Deborah Harkness, 2011) – first novel in the All Souls trilogy
- The Professor of Poetry (Grace McCleen, 2013)
- The Last Enchantments (Charles Finch, 2014)
- La Belle Sauvage (Philip Pullman, 2017)
- The Secret Commonwealth (Philip Pullman, 2019)

2020s

- The Sandpit (Nicholas Shakespeare, 2020)
- The Oxford Brotherhood (Guillermo Martínez, 2021)
- Babel (R.F. Kuang, 2022)

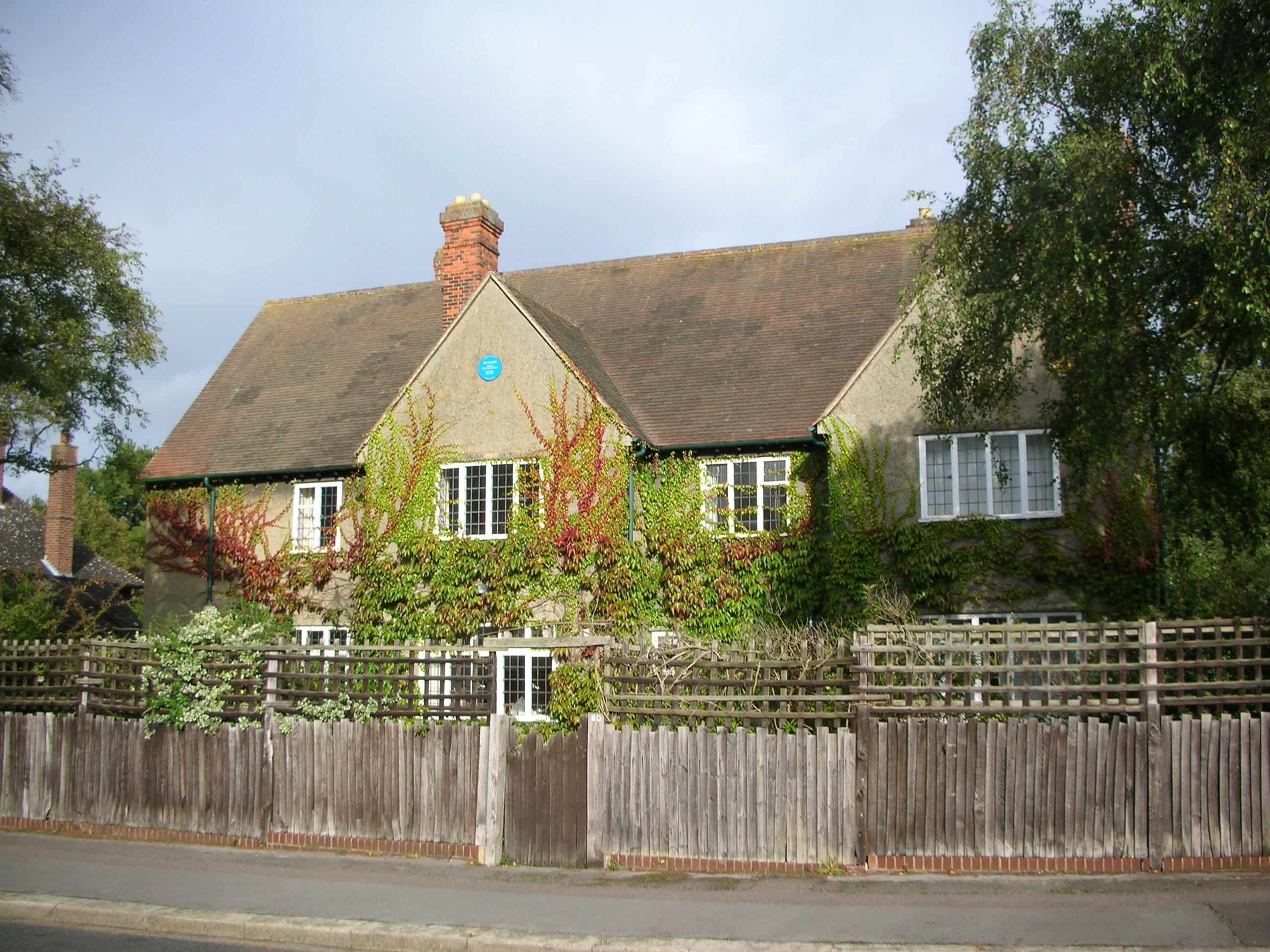
20 Northmoor Road, where Tolkien wrote The Hobbit and most of The Lord of the Rings.

== See also ==
- Oxford literature and film
- University of Oxford in literature and other media
- Oxford Literary Festival
- The Story Museum, a museum in Oxford
- List of fictional Oxford colleges
