= List of fictional Oxford colleges =

Fictional colleges are found in many modern novels, films, and other works of fiction, probably because they allow the author greater licence for invention and a reduced risk of being accused of libel, as might happen if the author depicted unsavoury events as occurring at a real-life institution. Below is a list of some of the fictional colleges of the University of Oxford.

== His Dark Materials ==
Philip Pullman's His Dark Materials novels feature a number of fictional Oxford colleges, most notably Jordan College, including:

- Cardinal's College
- Foxe College
- Gabriel College
- Jordan College
- Queen Philippa's College
- St Michael's College
- St Scholastica's College
- St Sophia's College
- Wordsworth College
- Wykeham College

== Inspector Morse ==
The Inspector Morse series of books by Colin Dexter is predominantly set within Oxford and its environs, including the University. Consequently, many fictional colleges are named. The derived television series, Inspector Morse, Lewis and Endeavour, continued this practice.

T=TV series

Name	Source	Details	Filmed (College)
Alfreda's College	Endeavour T: "Fugue"		Trinity
Arnold College	Inspector Morse T		
Baidley College	Endeavour T: "Home"	Last episode of Season 1	Keble
Beaufort College	Inspector Morse T; Endeavour T: "Girl"	Named after Henry Beaufort, a Plantagenet royal and Chancellor of the University of Oxford from 1397 to 1399	
Beaumont College	Inspector Morse novels Inspector Morse episode ”The Last Enemy” Series 3 Episode 2	Beaumont Street is a short street in central Oxford. One end emerges opposite Balliol's side entrance, and it extends to the front of Worcester. Beaumont Street was formerly the site of Beaumont Palace, perhaps the "location" of the college.	
Benison College	Lewis, episode "Intelligent Design" Series 7 episodes 5/6		
Carlyle College	Lewis, episode "The Soul of Genius"		Exeter
Chaucer College	Lewis	Based on Merton College. Named after Geoffrey Chaucer, whose son Thomas also managed the affairs of Henry Beaufort, Oxford's Chancellor.	
Courtenay College	Inspector Morse T	Based on Oriel. Nuneham Courtenay is a village 5 miles south-east of Oxford; in the 14th century, the village belonged to the influential Courtenay family. Nuneham House now belongs to the University.	
Gresham College	Lewis, episode "Dark Matter"	Stand-in for Lincoln. The "Invisible College" was a group of Oxford scientists (including Robert Boyle, Robert Hooke and Christopher Wren) who went on to establish the Royal Society. The group met at Gresham College in London.	The Radcliffe Observatory at Green College
Hescott College	Endeavour T: "Confection"		Oriel
Lady Matilda's College	Lewis episode "Old, Unhappy, Far-Off Things"; Endeavour episode "Home"	Amalgamation of Lady Margaret Hall and St Hilda's	Lady Margaret Hall
Lonsdale College	Inspector Morse novels and subsequent Lewis T	College attended by Endeavour Morse.	Brasenose
Lovelace College	Endeavour TV series; "Game", the first episode of Season 4		St Catherine's
Mayfield College	Lewis episode "Life Born of Fire"	Mayfield Press is based in Cowley Road; the nearest college would be Greyfriars on Iffley Road.	In and around Brasenose
Penville	Lewis episode "Old School Ties"	The leader of the Oxford Union says she usually lives here; this is presumably a reference to her fictional college.	
St Gerard's Hall	Lewis episode "Wild Justice"	Fictional permanent private hall Exterior of college filmed at New College, with a barn entrance in New College Lane.	St Edmund Hall and Christ Church
St Jude's College	Lewis episode "Generation of Vipers"		
St Saviour's College	Inspector Morse, episode "Fat Chance"		New College
St Sebastian's College	Lewis episode "Lions of Nemea"		St Edmund Hall
Savile College	Lewis		In and around Trinity
Trevelyan College	Lewis		
Wolsey College	Inspector Morse novels and Endeavour	Based on Christ Church: Cardinal Wolsey founded Christ Church.	

== Jude the Obscure ==
Thomas Hardy's novel Jude the Obscure is set in Christminster, "Wessex", a thinly fictionalised version of Oxford, and mentions the following colleges of Christminster University:

- Biblioll College (Balliol)
- Cardinal College (Christ Church)
- Crozier College (Oriel?)
- Oldgate College (New College)
- Rubric College (Brasenose?)
- Sarcophagus College
- Tudor College

== Loss and Gain ==
Loss and Gain by St John Henry Newman tells the story of the conversion of Charles Reding, an Oxford student, to Catholicism. In the novel, Newman creates the following colleges:

- Saint Saviour's (the college of the main character, Charles Reding)
- All Saints
- Leicester College
- Nun's Hall

== Other works ==
Name	Details
All Saints College	North and South by Elizabeth Gaskell. Stand-in for All Souls College
Apocalypse College	Private's Progress by Alan Hackney
Baillie College	Yes Minister and Yes, Prime Minister, attended by successive Cabinet Secretaries, Sir Arnold Robinson and Sir Humphrey Appleby. A very thinly veiled stand-in for Balliol; in several episodes Sir Humphrey Appleby is seen wearing a Balliol tie, and in the 2011 stage play version, Appleby is stated as having gone to Balliol, not "Baillie"
Bartlemas College	Kate Ivory detective novels by Veronica Stallwood. Takes its name from St Bartholomew's Chapel, which belonged to Oriel College
Bede College	Operation Pax by Michael Innes (pseudonym of J. I. M. Stewart). Allusion to the Old English polymath Bede, whose histories give us the account of St Hilda, from whom St Hilda's College, Oxford takes its name
Brazenface College	Verdant Green by Cuthbert Bede. Very thinly veiled reference to Brasenose College
Candlin College	In Young Sherlock, the college attended by James Moriarity, and where Sherlock Holmes works as a scout.
Canterbury College	The Mezzotint by M. R. James, which is set in a thinly-veiled version of Oxford, "Bridgeford".
Cardinal College	A Yank at Oxford. Based on Christ Church, which was founded by Cardinal Thomas Wolsey as "Cardinal College" in 1525
Episcopus College	Where the Rivers Meet and Comedies by John Wain
Hacker College	The Complete Yes Minister
Judas College	Zuleika Dobson by Max Beerbohm. Based on Merton College. Referenced in William Peter Blatty's 1960 semi-autobiographical comic novel Which Way to Mecca, Jack?
The King's College	(Known as "Dick's" after its founder Richard II) – Colonel Butler's Wolf and Our Man in Camelot by Anthony Price. "The King's College" is another name for Oriel College; Richard II has no historically significant involvement with Oxford
Kingsbridge College	World Without End and A Column of Fire by Ken Follett
Lancaster College	Incense for the Damned, a Peter Cushing horror film set partially in Oxford, based on Doctors Wear Scarlet by Simon Raven
Lazarus College	Barchester Towers by Anthony Trollope
Lazarus College	Several novels by Angela Thirkell, beginning with Summer Half (1937)
Lazarus College	The Secret World massively multiplayer online role-playing game
Magog College	A Study in Sorcery by Michael Kurland/Randall Garrett
Mandeville College	"The Crime of the Communist", a Father Brown story by G. K. Chesterton
Mortarhouse College	Ghost Light (Doctor Who) serial
Old College	Lot No. 249 by Arthur Conan Doyle
Pelham College	The It Girl by Ruth Ware
Pentecost College	Montague Egg short story "Murder at Pentecost", in Hangman's Holiday by Dorothy L. Sayers. On the north side of Broad Street, to the east of Trinity
Persephone College	Death on the Cherwell by Mavis Doriel Hay. Women's college based on St Hilda's, Hay's old college
Pitt College	Black Chalk by Christopher J. Yates
Plymouth College	North and South by Elizabeth Gaskell; alludes to Exeter College
Raleigh College	The Oxford Inheritance by Ann A. McDonald, and Sophomore Switch (published as Life Swap in the UK) by Abby McDonald
St Ambrose's College	Tom Brown at Oxford by Thomas Hughes. Probably based on Oriel College
St Anselm's College	Death in the Spires by KJ Charles; a murder mystery set in the 1890s and 1905. St Anselm's stands on or near Broad Street next to Trinity College, and is built around four quads. Its associated women's hall is the equally fictional Anselm Hall
St Bride's College	Michaelmas Term at St Bride's, by Brunette Coleman (Philip Larkin), St Bride's is recognisably based on Somerville College
St Christopher's College	The Case of the Gilded Fly and The Moving Toyshop by Edmund Crispin. Located on the north side of St John's (Crispin's old college) at the junction of St Giles' and Banbury Road
St David's College	A Study in Sorcery by Michael Kurland/Randall Garrett
St Ervan's College	An Oxford University Chest by John Betjeman
St Frideswide's College	What Men Say by Joan Smith
St George's College	Yes Minister television series. There was a late-medieval establishment of this name
St Jerome's College	Endymion Spring by Matthew Skelton: on St Giles', with echoes of Somerville College (Skelton's alma mater)
St Jerome's College	The Reluctant Cannibals by Ian Flitcroft (south of the High Street)
St Joseph's College	Rumpole series by John Mortimer (in "Rumpole and the Younger Generation", Rumpole is said to have attended the real-life Keble College)
St Jude's College	Formosa by Dion Boucicault; August Folly by Angela Thirkell (also in Lewis; see above)
St Margaret's College	Fire and Hemlock by Diana Wynne Jones. Probably based on Lady Margaret Hall
St Mark's College	The Pursuit of Love by Nancy Mitford; Patrick Grant crime novels by Margaret Yorke; The Stars' Tennis Balls by Stephen Fry
St Mary's College	Sinister Street by Compton Mackenzie (based closely on Magdalen College, Mackenzie's old college, named after St Mary Magdalene)
St Mary's College	The Poison Tree by Tony Strong (based on St Peter's College); and Rough Justice by Charles Edward Montague
St Matthew's College	The Dimension Riders by Daniel Blythe
St Paul's College	Ravenshoe by Henry Kingsley
St Paul's College	August Folly by Angela Thirkell
St Sebastian's College	Arden St Ives books by Alexis Hall; Hut 33
St Severin's College	The Late Scholar by Jill Paton Walsh using Dorothy L. Sayers' characters. On Parks Road, next to Wadham
St Simeon's College	Death on the Cherwell by Mavis Doriel Hay. Located approximately on the site of Lady Margaret Hall
St Thomas' College	An Oxford Tragedy and The Case of the Four Friends by John Cecil Masterman. St Thomas the Martyr's Church is located near Osney, and belongs to Christ Church
Scone College	Decline and Fall by Evelyn Waugh; Something Nasty in the Woodshed and The Great Mortdecai Moustache Mystery by Kyril Bonfiglioli, in whose novels Scone College represents Balliol College. John de Balliol was crowned king at Scone, Scotland in 1292
Shrewsbury College	Gaudy Night by Dorothy L. Sayers. Women's college, based on Somerville College, Sayers' old college, but located on the site of Balliol's cricket ground in Jowett Walk
Simon Magus College	Let Dons Delight and The Footsteps at the Lock by Ronald Knox
Stendell College	The Gentlemen directed by Guy Ritchie. Mickey Pearson (Matthew McConaughey) attends the college on a Rhodes Scholarship and begins selling marijuana while there
Warlock College	Landscape with Dead Dons by Robert Robinson
	An unnamed college in A Staircase in Surrey, a quintet of novels by J. I. M. Stewart, based on Christ Church, but never named; Surrey is the name of a quadrangle within the fictional college

== Fictional library ==
- In Ben Aaronovitch's Rivers of London series, Oxford's Bodleian Library has a secret part, known and accessible only to practitioners of Magic and containing among other things the secret writings of Isaac Newton on this subject.

== See also ==
- Colleges of the University of Oxford
- List of fictional Cambridge colleges
- List of fictional Oxbridge colleges
- List of books about Oxford
- List of fictional University of Oxford people
