= List of fictional University of Oxford people =

This is a list of fictional people associated with the University of Oxford. Some characters attended fictional colleges; others attended genuine colleges at the university.

== List ==
- Sir Humphrey Appleby GCB (Baillie, perhaps Balliol College) Yes Minister and Yes Prime Minister
- Stephen Barley The Historian by Elizabeth Kostova
- Lyra Belacqua (the fictional Jordan) His Dark Materials
- Edmund Bertram Mansfield Park
- Anthony Blanche Brideshead Revisited
- James Bond Tomorrow Never Dies
- Lord Brideshead Brideshead Revisited
- Tom Brown (St Ambrose's, probably based on Oriel) Tom Brown at Oxford
- Prince Bumpo Doctor Dolittle
- 'Chacko' The God of Small Things
- The Clerk of Oxenford The Canterbury Tales
- Simon Cormack The Negotiator
- Frasier Crane Frasier
- Thomas Crown The Thomas Crown Affair
- Dick Diver (Rhodes Scholar) Tender Is the Night
- Zuleika Dobson by Max Beerbohm
- Robert Elsmere by Mrs Humphry Ward
- Kivrin Engle Doomsday Book
- Gervase Fen (the fictional St Christopher's) by Edmund Crispin
- Edward Ferrars Sense and Sensibility
- Lord Sebastian Flyte (Christ Church) Brideshead Revisited
- Charles Gardner (the fictional St Sebastian's) Hut 33
- Jay Gatsby The Great Gatsby
- Rupert Giles Buffy the Vampire Slayer
- Patrick Grant (the fictional St Mark's) by Margaret Yorke
- Verdant Green (the fictional Brazenface) The Adventures of Mr. Verdant Green
- Rev. Mr. Hale (the fictional Plymouth, based on Exeter College) North and South
- Basil Hallward The Picture of Dorian Gray
- Bill Haydon by John le Carré
- Captain Hook (Balliol) Peter Pan
- Master Keaton and his wife (Somerville)
- John Kemp Jill
- Vanessa Kensington Austin Powers: International Man of Mystery
- Chatter Lal Indiana Jones and the Temple of Doom
- Archie Leach A Fish Called Wanda
- Canon Leigh (Christ Church) Towers in the Mist by Elizabeth Goudge
- Alwin Lowdham The Notion Club Papers
- DI Thomas Lynley The Inspector Lynley Mysteries
- Helen Magnus Sanctuary
- Pincher Martin (Christ Church)
- Mary, Marie, Margaret and Myfanwy (the fictional St Bride's College (Somerville)) by Philip Larkin
- Ranald McKechnie (a fictional college with a Surrey Quad) A Staircase in Surrey
- Jenny Mellor (Merton College) An Education
- Colonel Sebastian Moran The Adventure of the Empty House
- Chief Inspector Endeavour Morse (St John's or the fictional Lonsdale) Colin Dexter's Morse novels and TV adaptations
- Fox Mulder The X-Files
- Nikki (Wadham) The Incandescent by Emily Tesh
- Duncan Patullo (a fictional college with a Surrey Quad) A Staircase in Surrey
- Paul The Historian by Elizabeth Kostova
- Paul Pennyfeather (the fictional Scone College) Decline and Fall
- Charles Reding (the fictional St Saviour's College) Loss and Gain
- Rumpole of the Bailey (Keble or the fictional St Joseph's)
- Mary Russell by Laurie R. King
- Charles Ryder Brideshead Revisited
- Connie Sachs by John le Carré
- Donna Sheridan (New College) Mamma Mia!
- George Smiley (Lincoln) by John le Carré
- Roderick Spode The Code of the Woosters
- Gwen Stacy (Somerville) in The Amazing Spider-Man 2
- Prince Nasir al-Subaai and Prince Meshal al-Subaai Syriana
- Connie Tate The West Wing TV series
- Sir Leigh Teabing The Da Vinci Code
- Paul Temple by Francis Durbridge
- Nigel Thornberry The Wild Thornberrys
- Henry Tilney Northanger Abbey
- Professor Timberlake (J. R. R. Tolkien) (a fictional college with a Surrey Quad) A Staircase in Surrey
- Harriet Vane (the fictional Shrewsbury College (Somerville)) by Dorothy L. Sayers
- Sapphire Walden (St. Catherine's) The Incandescent by Emily Tesh
- Will (Christ Church) The Incandescent by Emily Tesh
- Lord Peter Wimsey (Balliol) by Dorothy L. Sayers
- Viscount St George Wimsey (Christ Church) by Dorothy L. Sayers
- Bertie Wooster (Magdalen) by P. G. Wodehouse
- Lord Henry Wotton The Picture of Dorian Gray
- Charles Xavier (Pembroke) X-Men
