= Teddy Joyce =

Canadian swing bandleader and actor (1904–1941)

- Born: Edmund John Cuthbertson; 6 June 1904; Toronto, Ontario, Canada
- Died: 10 February 1941 (aged 36) Glasgow, Scotland, UK
- Genres: Jazz; swing; British dance band
- Occupations: Bandleader; actor
- Years active: 1934–1941
- Partner: Chili Bouchier (1935–1941)

Teddy Joyce (born Edmund John Cuthbertson; 6 June 1904 – 10 February 1941) was a Canadian-born English swing jazz bandleader and actor.

== Early life ==
Teddy Joyce was born in Toronto, Ontario, Canada. Originally training to be a violinist, he suffered an accident to his hand which prevented him from performing professionally.

== Career ==
In January 1934, he traveled to England, and in April of that year, took up a position as master of ceremonies at the Kit-Cat Club (Haymarket, London), where he organised and led a band until 1940.

Around 1936, Joyce formed a male dance band, and later, also started an all-female band called The Girl Friends. Mabel Willis-Browne (1911–2001), who at the time led the Petulengro band at the Kit-Cat Club, was offered a job by Joyce as lead violinist of the female band. In her memoir, Willis-Browne recounted her time in the band: "His presentation was to be completely different – very stylish and slick [...] Routine was very strict – almost daily rehearsals and each section – strings, saxes and brass – were expected to 'warm up' before every show. Teddy would shout from his room if he didn't hear us." Also hired to the band were Ivy Benson, lead saxophonist and clarinet; Blanche Coleman, second violin (1910–2008; who would later go on to become a bandleader, herself); and bassist Elsie Ford; there would be twenty-four women in the group. Towards the end of 1936, the Teddy Joyce band was auditioned by the BBC, who was interested in employing more female musicians for their broadcasts. Orchestration for the band was done by Bob Busby. About this engagement, Willis-Browne noted positive critical reception, including a BBC description of the band as having "a tone like cream and a knife-like attack".

During 1938–1940, he performed on various radio shows.

Joyce also had an acting career, and he appeared in the films Crooner (1932), Radio Follies (1934), and Business Is a Pleasure (1934).

== Personal life ==
He met British actress Chili Bouchier in 1935, and they became engaged the following year; however, he died before they could marry.

Joyce died after suffering from meningitis, on 10 February 1941, aged 34, in Glasgow, Scotland.
