= Julia Doyle =

Julia Doyle may refer to:

- Julia Doyle, musician in the Lydia D'Ustebyn Ladies Swing Band
- Julia Doyle, character in the TV series Revolution
- Julia Doyle, actress who appears in the American TV series From
