= The Story of Cirrus Flux =

Book by Matthew Skelton

- First edition cover
- Author: Matthew Skelton
- Publisher: Puffin Books
- Publication date: June 4, 2009
- ISBN: 978-0-141-32037-3

The Story of Cirrus Flux is an adventure novel by English-Canadian author Matthew Skelton. It is the second children's novel written by Skelton, following Endymion Spring in 2006.

== Plot summary ==
The story takes place in 18th century London, and follows an orphan boy named Cirrus Flux. When he was born, his explorer father, James Flux, left him at an orphanage while he carried out his duties to the Guild of Empirical Sciences. He set sail, hoping to find more of a brilliant and mysterious light known as the Breath of God. But he did not return from his journey. Now the only known place where the light can allegedly be found is inside a token left for Cirrus Flux by his father.

Now, 12 years later, Cirrus is on the run from his orphanage, where a member of the Guild of Empirical Sciences has come seeking him and his token.

== Reception ==
Kirkus Reviews gave the book a positive review, praising its well-developed characters and its "chaotic but satisfying conclusion". Writing for The Guardian, Kathryn Hughes also gave the book a positive review, giving particular attention to Skelton's descriptive writing. She concluded that it was not as good as Skelton's previous book, but "still shows a young, talented author stretching his craft"

== Matthew Skelton works ==
- Endymion Spring
