= The Sandpit =

2020 novel

- First edition
- Author: Nicholas Shakespeare
- Language: English
- Subject: Thriller
- Genre: Fiction
- Publisher: Harvill Secker, Penguin Random House
- Media type: Hardback, paperback, ebook, audio download
- Pages: xi+432
- ISBN: 978-1-787-30176-4

The Sandpit (2020) is a novel by Nicholas Shakespeare.

== Overview ==
The book is a thriller based in Oxford, England. It references the Phoenix school, based on the Dragon School in North Oxford, which Shakespeare attended in the 1960s. The Dragon is used as the name of a cinema, whereas there is actually a Phoenix Picturehouse not far from the Dragon School.

== Reviews ==
The book has been reviewed in the following magazines and newspapers:

- The Canberra Times.
- Evening Standard.
- The Guardian.
- The Scotsman.
- The Spectator.
- The Sunday Telegraph.

== See also ==
- List of books about Oxford
