= Crooner (film) =

1932 film

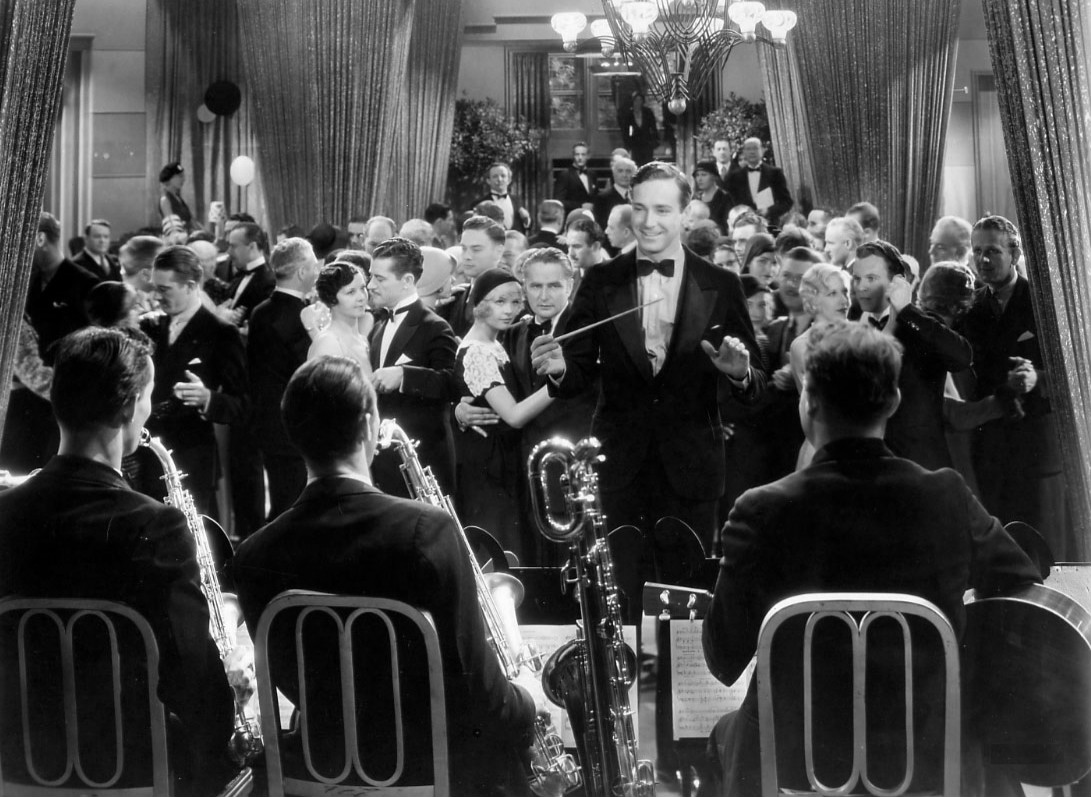
- Teddy Taylor (David Manners) conducts his band
- Directed by: Lloyd Bacon
- Screenplay by: Charles Kenyon
- Story by: based on a story by Rian James
- Produced by: Lucien Hubbard
- Starring: David Manners; Ann Dvorak
- Cinematography: Robert Kurrle
- Edited by: Howard Bretherton
- Music by: Vitaphone Orchestra conducted by Leo F. Forbstein
- Production company: First National Pictures
- Distributed by: Warner Bros. Pictures
- Release date: August 20, 1932
- Running time: 67 minutes
- Country: United States
- Language: English

Crooner is a 1932 American pre-Code musical comedy drama film directed by Lloyd Bacon and starring David Manners along with Ann Dvorak and Ken Murray. It concerns the abrupt rise and fall of a popular crooner, Teddy Taylor.

A print is held by the Library of Congress.

== Plot ==
Teddy Taylor is the leader of Ted Taylor's Collegians. One night, his usual singer can't sing. He decides to try out singing. However, his voice can't be heard over the band. A dancer stops and jokes with him by handing him a megaphone. Taylor sings through it, and he is heard. The ladies are enamored with his soft voice while the men are disgusted. Taylor becomes a big star over night, but his ego becomes inflated. Things come to a head when Taylor loses his temper and punches a heckler in the audience, who he didn't realize was a cripple. Shunned, he loses his girlfriend, his band, his fame, and his dignity.

In the final scene, as a drunk and unhappy Peter Sturgis, who promoted Teddy Taylor into a singing star and gave up his fiancée Judy Mason to him, continues to drink heavily in a speakeasy, an announcer on the speakeasy's radio proclaims, "…And now, it is our great privilege to bring to you the new sensation of the air, Bang Busby, who will croon for you in his inimitable manner, 'Sweethearts Forever'". As the song, which had already been sung a number of times by Teddy Taylor, begins to be heard, Sturgis grabs a bottle and hurls it at the radio, breaking it.

== Cast ==
- David Manners as Teddy Taylor
- Ann Dvorak as Judy Mason
- Ken Murray as Peter Sturgis
- J. Carroll Naish as Nick Meyer
- Guy Kibbee as Mike
- Claire Dodd as Mrs. Brown
- Allen Vincent as Ralph
- Edward J. Nugent as Henry
- William Janney as Pat
- Teddy Joyce as Mack

Uncredited (in order of appearance)

- Herman Bing as German-accented vaudevillian with dachshunds
- Sumner Getchell as Teddy's band member
- John Harron as Teddy's band member
- Harry Stubbs as stage manager who cuts performance of Teddy's band
- Brick Holton [voice only] as Teddy Taylor's singing voice
- Dennis O'Keefe as man on dance floor
- William Bailey as man on dance floor
- Leo White as man on dance floor
- Bert Moorhouse as man on dance floor
- Mary Treen as woman who listens with pleasure to Teddy's singing
- Harrison Greene as man on dance floor
- Lee Phelps as man on dance floor
- Emmett King as man on dance floor
- Wild Bill Elliott as man on dance floor
- Sheila Terry as hatcheck girl telling Meyer how well Teddy sings
- Hattie McDaniel as women's room maid who admires Teddy's singing
- Olaf Hytten as nightclub patron impatient about having his hat checked
- Rolfe Sedan as waiter who comes to Judy's and Peter's table
- Ruth Hall as Peter Sturgis' secretary
- James Donlan as man who shuts off radio upon hearing Teddy sing
- John Larkin as men's room attendant who comments on Teddy's singing
- Luis Alberni as Tamborini, Teddy's singing coach
- Allan Lane as Heckler on dance floor
- George Magrill as nightclub brawler

== Production ==
Brick Holton provided Ted Taylor's singing voice. Rudy Vallée was originally considered for the role of Taylor, but contracts prevented this.

== Reception ==
"It hands a loud but quite amusing razz to all such radio performers," wrote a critic for Photoplay. "Ken Murray and Ann Dvorak help to make this bright and entertaining."

== Soundtrack ==
- "In a Shanty in Old Shanty Town"

Music by Jack Little and John Siras
Lyrics by Joe Young

- "Sweethearts Forever"

Music by Cliff Friend
Lyrics by Irving Caesar

- "Three's a Crowd"

Music by Harry Warren
Lyrics by Al Dubin and Irving Kahal

- "I Send My Love With These Roses"

Music by Joe Burke
Lyrics by Benny Davis

- "You're Just a Beautiful Melody of Love"

Music by Bing Crosby and Babe Goldberg
