= June Smith (jazz singer) =

Australian jazz musician

- Born: June Robinson; 9 June 1930; Edinburgh, Scotland
- Died: 6 May 2016 (aged 85); Australia
- Education: University of Western Australia
- Occupations: Jazz musician, singer
- Spouse: Lew Smith
- Children: Four

June Smith (9 June 1930 in Edinburgh – 6 May 2016) was a British-born Australian jazz singer, trumpeter and music teacher who performed in her later years in the region around Perth, Western Australia.

== Life ==
June Robinson was born in Edinburgh, Scotland on 9 June 1930. Her mother was a singer and pianist and her father was a saxophonist. At 16, she officially began her performing career as a singer and trumpeter with the girls' band of Blanche Coleman. Three years later she became a member of "Britain’s most famous all female swing band, Ivy Benson and Her All Girl Orchestra," performing in British music halls and during several overseas tours, including North Africa, to entertain the armed forces. Bands like Benson's were formed during World War II when most male musicians were called up for combat duty.

In 1951, she met the saxophone and clarinet player Lew Smith at Butlin's Holiday Camp in Filey, North Yorkshire. They married on 8 December 1952, and she changed her name to June Smith. In 1955, the couple were both playing in the Denny Boyce Orchestra, at the Orchid Ballroom, Purley, in London.

=== Emigration ===
In 1961 she emigrated with her husband to Australia. In Melbourne, June and Lew were performing in the rock band Maximum Load, which had a local hit with Riding Through the Dandenong Ranges.

In 1974, they moved to Perth, Western Australia, with June appearing on the radio, in addition to performances with the West Australia Symphony Orchestra. On the jazz scene, she became a member of Helen Matthews's Jazz Divas and she later founded her own group: June Smith and the Apple Band with her husband Lew. In 1992 she founded the club Jazz Fremantle, south of Perth.

According to Lee:

June embodied two vital ingredients with her vocal delivery: an ability to swing and an ability to create blues inflexions with her voice... June’s deep understanding of the nuances of jazz gleaned initially as a trumpeter gave her jazz performances an integrity that can only come after years of performing and listening.

The Perth Jazz Society, of which she was a founder in 1973, chose Smith for its annual Lifetime Achievement Award in 2005. She continued to perform musically until 2013 at age 83.

=== Personal life ===
Although she had completed her childhood education in Scotland, she returned to university in Perth and in 1981 received a librarian's degree. She also found employment as a librarian at the University of Western Australia, Department for the Arts.

She died peacefully on 6 May 2016 surrounded by family and her husband of 63 years.
