= University Chest =

The University Chest is a term used, with slightly varying meaning, at the University of Oxford and the University of Cambridge. The abbreviated form The Chest is common at Cambridge.

== Oxford ==
At Oxford the term is used in connection with the financial aspects of the university and its administration.

There has traditionally been an actual chest, an iron box that can be locked and used for storage. The current Chest at Oxford was made in the 17th century and is officially called "The Painted Chest".

Today, the modern "Chest" is in practice the finance department of the university. The central administration is located in modern buildings in Wellington Square.

== Cambridge ==
At Cambridge the term is used to refer to the main capital account of the university. Again, the term derives from an actual chest, which was used to secure University property from the medieval period.

== See also ==
- An Oxford University Chest by John Betjeman (1938).
