= Lydia D'Ustebyn Ladies Swing Band =

British feminist swing band

- Lydia D'Ustebyn Swing Band

Background information
- Origin: United Kingdom
- Genre: Swing
- Past members: Alison Rayner; Angele Veltmyer; Annie Whitehead; Barbara Snow; Deirdre Cartwright; Josphina Cupido; Julia Doyle; Dorota Koc; Lesley; Linda da Mango; Ruthie Smith; Virginia Betts

The Lydia D'Ustebyn's Ladies Swing Band was a British feminist swing band of all female musicians. Lydia D'Ustebyn was not a real person, but a fictional character based on Ivy Benson—a famous London woman band leader. The band would frequently apologize that Lydia was absent from performances, because she had "missed the train."

== Band members ==
- Alison Rayner – bass guitar
- Angele Veltmyer – tenor sax
- Annie Whitehead – trombone
- Barbara Snow – trumpet
- Deirdre Cartwright – guitar
- Josphina Cupido – drums
- Julia Doyle – double bass
- Laka Daisical (Dorota Koc) – piano, vocals
- Lesley ?? – baritone sax
- Linda da Mango – percussion
- Ruthie Smith – alto sax
- Virginia Betts – trumpet
