= Cuthbert Bradley =

English painter

- Born: Cuthbert Edward Bradley; 1861
- Died: 25 November 1941 (aged 79–80); Folkingham
- Burial place: St Andrew's Church, Folkingham
- Education: King's College London
- Father: Edward Bradley

Cuthbert Edward Bradley (1861– 25 November 1941) was an English painter, sporting writer and magazine illustrator.

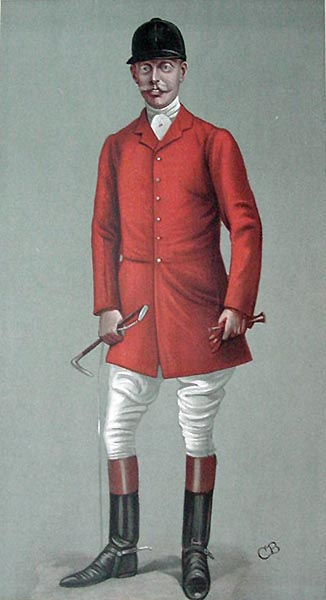
Tommy Burns, 1900 Vanity Fair illustration

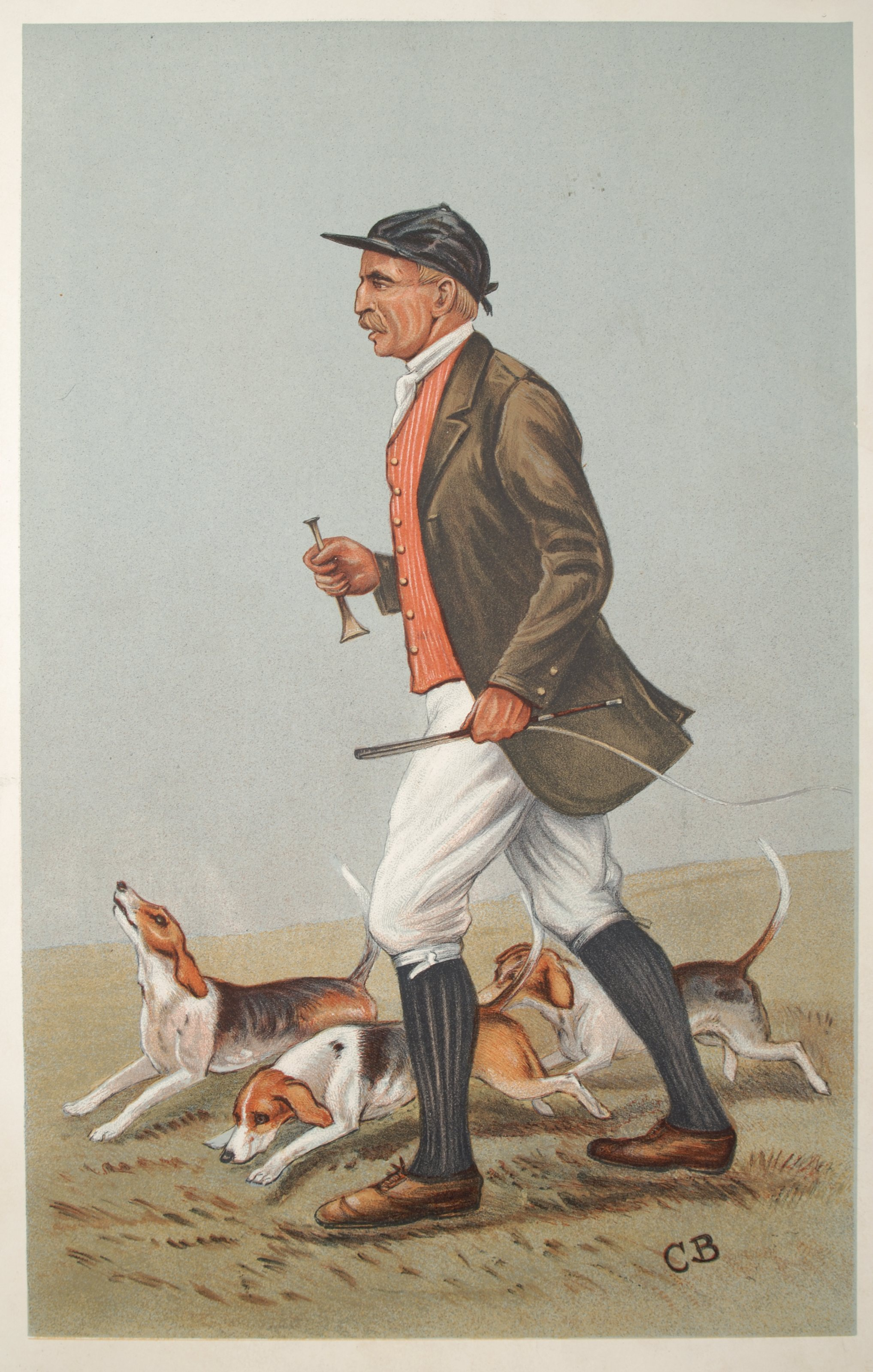
John Otho Paget, 1902 Vanity Fair illustration

== Biography ==
Cuthbert Bradley was the eldest son of The Reverend Edward Bradley (1827 – 1889), who wrote under the pen name, 'Cuthbert Bede'. He graduated from King's College London, where he studied architecture.

He worked as a sporting journalist for The Field and as a magazine illustrator for Vanity Fair. He also wrote books about foxhunting. His paintings depicted scenes of foxhunting and polo.

His 1901 painting "King's Messenger" can be seen at the Penrhyn Castle. Other paintings are kept by Leicestershire County Council Museums Service.

He lived at The Lodge in Folkingham, Lincolnshire. He died there on 25 November 1941 and was buried at St Andrew's Church, Folkingham; he had been church warden at the church for the past 42 years.

== Paintings ==
- Ranelagh - Mr Milburn on Teddy Roosevelt
- Mr J. Watson Webb, the left-handed American No. 3 going thirty miles an hour
- Lewis Lacey on Marie Sol
- Jupiter
- County Cup Final Game, July 9, 1891
- Roehampton Open Challenge Cup
- Kings Messenger Held by a Groom (1901)
- The Ledbury Hounds (1913)
- Quorn Hounds, Cruiser and Woeful (1926)
- Fallible and Ranter (1926)
- Quorn Hounds, Batsman, Baffler, Weaver and Batchelor (1927)
- Quorn Hound, Wonderful (1929)
- Belvoir, Sir Gilbert Hart Greenall
- A Father of The Belvoir
- Lady Ursula Manners (1936)

== Bibliography ==
- The Foxhound of the Twentieth Century; The Breeding and Work of the Kennels of England
- Hounds: Their Breeding and Kennel Management
- The Reminiscences Of Frank Gillard (Huntsman) With The Belvoir Hounds-1860 To 1896
- Fox-Hunting from Shire to Shire (1912)
