= Gracie Cole =

British trumpeter and bandleader

- Born: 8 September 1924; Rowlands Gill, County Durham
- Died: 28 December 2006 (aged 82) Westcott, Surrey
- Instruments: Trumpet, cornet
- Formerly of: Ivy Benson Band

Grace Elizabeth Agnes Annie Cole (8 September 1924 – 28 December 2006) was a British trumpeter and bandleader. She was lead soloist in Ivy Benson's all-girls band during the 1940s, going on to form her own all-female band in the 1950s.

== Early life ==
Gracie Cole was born on 8 September 1924 in Rowlands Gill, County Durham. Her father Albert moved to Yorkshire in search of work as a miner when Gracie was two years old. Albert played cornet in colliery bands, and taught Gracie to play the cornet at the age of 12. Gracie played with local brass bands in her teens, including the Firbeck Colliery Band alongside her father. In 1939, aged 15, she made her first broadcast on BBC Radio for Children's Hour.

== Career ==
From 1940, Cole appeared as a guest soloist in two concerts with the Besses o' th' Barn brass band, and played with various other bands including the Grimethorpe Colliery Band. In 1942 she became the first woman to compete for the Alexander Owen memorial scholarship, and won by an unprecedented 21-point margin.

Later in 1942, Cole switched to being a dance band trumpeter, initially joining Gloria Gaye's All Girls Band, who toured playing theatres and forces entertainment shows organised by the Entertainments National Service Association (ENSA). She then joined Rudy Starita's All-American band, entertaining American G.I.s. In November 1945 she joined Ivy Benson's band as lead trumpet and soloist, and toured with them for the next five years, headlining at variety theatres in Britain and touring Europe and the Middle East with ENSA. The band also featured on television and radio, including their own radio series Ladies Night, and on Christmas Day 1945, Cole was the featured soloist on a live broadcast from Hamburg immediately after the King's speech.

In 1951 she married Bill Geldard, a trombonist with the George Evans Band, and accepted an invitation to join the previously all-male band. After 18 months she and Geldard left to join the Squadronaires, the most influential big band of the time, where she was again the only woman. However, Cole found that the male prejudice she experienced there made life uncomfortable, and she left to form her own all-female band, which she fronted between 1952 and 1956. The band performed jazz and pop, and broadcast with guest singers including Cleo Laine. In 1958, Cole led an all-male band at Mecca Ballrooms.

From the 1960s, Cole concentrated on bringing up her two daughters and played on a freelance basis. She was active in encouraging local brass bands, and was made a freeman of the City of London in 1990.

== Later life ==
Cole developed Alzheimer's disease towards the end of the 1990s. She died on 28 December 2006 in Westcott, Surrey aged 82.
