= Barbara Trapido =

British novelist (born 1941)

- Born: Barbara Schuddeboom; 1941 (age 84–85); Cape Town, South Africa
- Education: University of Natal (BA)
- Occupation: Novelist

Barbara (Louise) Trapido (born 1941 as Barbara Schuddeboom), is a British novelist .

== Biography ==
She born in Cape Town, South Africa with German, Danish and Dutch ancestry. She grew up in Durban, and she studied at the University of Natal gaining a BA in 1963 before emigrating to London. After many years teaching, she became a full-time writer in 1970.

Trapido has published seven novels, three of which have been nominated for the Whitbread Prize. Her semi-autobiographical Frankie & Stankie, one of those shortlisted, which deals with growing up white under apartheid, gained a great deal of critical attention, most of it favourable. It was also longlisted for the Booker prize. She was elected a Fellow of the Royal Society of Literature in 2011.

Barbara Trapido lives with her family in Oxford and some of her books have Oxford connections.

== Bibliography ==
- Brother of the More Famous Jack (1982)
- Noah's Ark (1984)
- Temples of Delight (1990)
- Juggling (1994)
- The Travelling Hornplayer (1998)
- Frankie & Stankie (2003)
- Sex & Stravinsky (2010)

== Reviews ==
- Frankie & Stankie, Observer newspaper
- Frankie & Stankie, Telegraph newspaper
- Sex & Stravinsky, The Independent newspaper
