= An Oxford University Chest =

Book by John Betjeman

- Title page for An Oxford University Chest (1970 edition)
- Author: John Betjeman
- Illustrator: László Moholy-Nagy; Osbert Lancaster; Edward Bradley
- Cover artist: Osbert Lancaster
- Language: English
- Subject: Oxford University; Architecture
- Set in: Oxford
- Publisher: John Miles
- Publication date: 1938
- Publication place: England
- Pages: XIV + 192

An Oxford University Chest is a book about the University of Oxford, written by the poet Sir John Betjeman and first published by John Miles in London in 1938. The full title is An Oxford University Chest. Comprising a Description of the Present State of the Town and University of Oxford with an itinerary arranged alphabetically.

The book includes photographs by László Moholy-Nagy and illustrations by Osbert Lancaster and Edward Bradley, the latter reproduced from the Victorian novel The Adventures of Mr. Verdant Green.

The title is a pun on the University Chest, the financial treasury of the university. The book provides glimpses into the life and characteristics of the university. Much of the book is given over to an architectural tour of the town and its university buildings.

A paperback edition was issued by Oxford University Press in 1979.
