= Juggling (novel) =

Novel by Barbara Trapido

- First edition
- Author: Barbara Trapido
- Language: English
- Publisher: Hamish Hamilton
- Publication date: 1994
- Publication place: United Kingdom
- Media type: Print
- Pages: 316
- ISBN: 0-241-00218-4
- Preceded by: Temples of Delight

Juggling is a 1994 novel by Barbara Trapido, nominated for the Whitbread Award that year. It is a sequel to her 1990 novel Temples of Delight, with characters appearing as teenagers and young adults in the earlier book are now parents.

== Inspiration ==
In an interview Trapido said that the book had the form of a Shakespearean comedy. She goes on to say "the book’s motivation had to do with the fact that Temples of Delight, the previous book was such a troubling one for me that I was still brooding on it...I was still worrying about Alice...So I used Alice and her husband as a kind of backdrop to the story about Christina and her sister Pam, which meant I could unravel the mysteries of Alice’s head along the way."

== Plot introduction ==
The novel is a coming of age story, the main protagonists are 'sparky Christina', the daughter of Alice, and her 'saintly adopted sister Pam' who could not be more different. They meet similarly mismatched friends Jago and Peter, and the intersecting lives of the four as they grow up form the heart of the novel.

== Reception ==
Michael Dibdin writing in The Independent explains that "The title puns on the Elizabethan sense of 'juggle': to play tricks so as to cheat or deceive somebody. Everyone in the novel does this to some extent, wittingly or not, as they try to juggle the details of their lives, keeping all the balls in the air, and holding the pattern together. The most daring and skilful juggler of all is Barbara Trapido herself, who puts her characters through dizzying permutations of gender, identity, background and relationships, both personal and genetic. The pace increases imperceptibly, creeping up on the reader, until what started as a fairly sober and straightforward study of generational conflicts ends in a pyrotechnic climax which exploits every Shakespearian device - identical twins, lost siblings, transposed parents, unlikely couples, outrageous coincidences and brazenly expedient plotting - to an extent which might have made even the Bard blush." and he concludes "The result is a work of enormous charm, highly entertaining and told with a deft touch, which handles serious matters lightly and treats light ones with proper respect".
