= Blanche Coleman =

British bandleader (1910–2008)

- Born: Blanche Bella Schwartz; 28 February 1910; London, England
- Died: 22 April 2008 (aged 98)
- Education: Royal Academy of Music
- Occupations: Band leader, musician
- Known for: All Girls Band
- Spouse: Henry Soester (m. 1934)

Blanche Bella Coleman (born Blanche Schwartz; 28 February 1910 – 22 April 2008) was a British musician and leader of the renowned Blanche Coleman And Her All Girls Band, one of the first women's bands of the 1940s.

== Biography ==
Coleman was born Bella Schwartz at 18 Prince's Square, St George in the East, London, to Simon and Esther Schwartz (née Woolf). Simon was born in Kalisz, Poland, and Esther in what is now Grodno, Belarus. Coleman's father was a timber salesman and later fishmonger; her family owned a fish and chip shop at 30 Golborne Road, Westbourne Park. After showing an early talent for violin, she won a scholarship for the Royal Academy of Music. While the violin was her first love, she also played the clarinet and saxophone.

After playing in the orchestra of The Grange Cinema, Kilburn, she played in Harold Ramsey's Girl Friends, and Teddy Foster's Band.

=== Band leader ===
She formed her own band in 1938 and won a contract, against great competition, in 1942, to provide a 12-piece girls' band at The Royal Opera House, Covent Garden, which was converted into dance-hall for British and American service personnel during World War II.

She was also featured in regular radio broadcasts, including Saturday Night at the Palais, Ocean Revue of 1946 and the Sandown Summer Show (1947).

In 1947, her band was the resident band at 'Radio-Olympia', designed to stimulate interest in the newly revived BBC TV service. After this she led the resident band in Beach Ballroom Aberdeen, between 1948 and 1950 with John Hanson, a popular guest singer.

In the early 1950s, after much seaside work, she and her band were invited to entertain US Army troops in Germany. Given the honorary rank of major in the US Army, she and the band were housed in the infamous "Wannsee Villa" for a time. She wanted to take Cleo Laine with the band as vocalist, but the US Army said the race issue was too sensitive.

In later life, Coleman appeared in several films, including The World of Barry McKenzie, and she was frequently recognised as the "old lady at a bus stop" in Four Weddings & A Funeral.

She is mentioned in Andrew Motion's biography of Philip Larkin as being the inspiration for the pseudonym Brunette Coleman, under which Larkin wrote risqué girls' school stories, mainly to entertain his friend Kingsley Amis.

== Personal life ==
She married Henry Soester in 1934; he died in 1949.

Coleman died on 22 April 2008, at the age of 98. She was buried in Bushey's Jewish Cemetery the following day.

== See also ==
- June Smith (jazz singer), Singer and trumpeter with Coleman's band in 1946.

== External sources ==
- Kun, Josh, et al. Big Ears: Listening for Gender in Jazz Studies. United Kingdom, Duke University Press, 2008.
- Dahl, Linda. Stormy Weather: The Music and Lives of a Century of Jazzwomen. United States, Limelight Editions, 1989.
