= Veronica Stallwood =

- Born: London, United Kingdom
- Occupation: Novelist
- Writing career
- Genres: Thriller, Crime
- Website: www.veronicastallwood.com

Veronica Stallwood is the author of a series of novels set in Oxford and featuring Kate Ivory, historical novelist and often reluctant sleuth. Kate uses her skills in historical research to good effect in investigating events from the past on which several of the plots turn. Stallwood is also the author of two non-series novels.

Stallwood was born in London and lived in Athens and Beirut as a teenager. She moved from Belgium to Oxford where she worked for a publisher and as a cataloguer in the Bodleian Library and elsewhere, moving later to the small town of Charlbury, north-west of Oxford.

== Bibliography ==
- Deathspell (1992)
- Death and The Oxford Box (1993)
- Oxford Exit (1994)
- Oxford Mourning (1995)
- Oxford Fall (1996)
- Oxford Knot (1998)
- Oxford Blue (1998)
- Oxford Shift (1999)
- The Rainbow Sign (1999)
- Oxford Shadows (2000)
- Oxford Double (2001)
- Oxford Proof (2002)
- Oxford Remains (2004)
- Oxford Letters (2005)
- Oxford Menace (2007)
- Oxford Ransom (2011)
