= Endymion Spring =

2006 book by Matthew Skelton

- First edition cover
- Author: Matthew Skelton
- Cover artist: Bill Sanderson
- Language: English
- Genre: Fantasy literature
- Publisher: Delacorte Press
- Publication date: 2006
- Publication place: United Kingdom
- Media type: Print (Hardback)
- Pages: 448 pp

Endymion Spring is a children's fantasy novel by English Canadian author Matthew Skelton. It was first published in 2006.

== Origins and publishing history ==
At some point during the drafting of his Ph.D., the character that would later become Blake simply appeared to Skelton, trapped in a library and begging for help. Over the next three years, Skelton worked to finish his doctoral thesis. Upon its completion, he moved to Mainz, the setting for the first half of one of his story lines, and began writing the novel. Originally, the book was only Blake's story, and did not include the story by a friend who had reportedly asked him who Endymion Spring was. Endymion Spring was released in the United Kingdom in March 2006, and was published in the United States later in the same year, ahead of schedule.

Warner Bros. currently hold rights to an Endymion Spring film.

== Plot summary ==
Endymion Spring has a double storyline. The first story follows two children in current day Oxford, Blake and Duck Winters. Blake is twelve years old and his sister is a few years younger. The two happen to come across a strange book in a library in St Jerome's College on St Giles' (based on Somerville College), which is entitled Endymion Spring. After finding out that it leads to a book of all the knowledge in the world, all the knowledge Adam and Eve tried to obtain from eating of that forbidden tree of knowledge but lost, they then embark on a quest to find it. However, when they do, the story then becomes a battle against the Person in Shadow, a person whose heart has turned black with evil and desire for the knowledge and power of the book. The second story line follows the journey of Endymion Spring, a young printer's devil who works in Gutenberg's workshop, from his hometown in Mainz, Germany to Oxford, which was then a settlement of monks. The two story lines are about 600 years apart, with Spring's story taking place at the epoch of the printing press in 1453, and Blake's taking place in the late 20th or early 21st century.

=== Major themes ===
There are several themes throughout Endymion Spring. The first and foremost resonates throughout the book in the words "Bring only the insight the inside brings." These words appear to communicate a theme regarding knowledge, and how it should be used.

== Characters ==
- Blake Winters ― a preteen male (age 12) who is the protagonist of the modern story line. He finds the book which is later revealed as Endymion Spring and is ultimately the one that catapults the story into existence. Protagonist of the story.
- Duck Winters ― Blake's sister. Since her true name is not known, she is referred to as Duck throughout the book. She is portrayed as a precocious character, and often shelters from her insecurities regarding herself by showing off her intelligence to professors at Oxford, most of whom are very impressed, but annoys her brother Blake a lot and whenever somebody else like her brother finds something usual or unusual, she will never let that person go until she is completely sure and clarified about it. She constantly wears a bright yellow rain coat that she thinks will make sure her parents never have a severe fight again like The Great Argument.
- Juliet Winters/Sommers - Blake's mother. She is often upset with Blake and the troubles Blake causes. She was a member of Ex Libris Society.
- Christopher Winters - Blake's father. Blake sends him mail and postcards throughout the story. He was a member of Ex Libris Society.
- Diana Bentley - The Person in Shadow, as well as Sir Giles' wife.
- Sir Giles Bentley - A book collector, and one of the founders of the Ex Libris Society.
- Jolyon Fall- a man who befriends Blake. He has seen Endymion Spring before and knows much of its knowledge. He also was once a boyfriend of Duck's and Blake's mother, before she met their father.
- George Psalmanazar- (referred to as Psalmanazar throughout the entire book except for a few sentences) a man who was chosen by the book Endymion Spring just like Blake.
- Alice - Psalmanazar's dog. She wears a red bandana.
- Paula Roberts - the librarian at the Bodleian Library, who babysits Blake and Duck while their mother works
- Mephistopheles ― The librarian's cat, often sneaking into the library and causing trouble. The cat's name does not seem to hold any significance in the book, although a character that shares its name is found in pact with the Devil, the book which Faust came from. This cat was not made up from the author's point of view when he was writing this story. The cat is based on the college cat Pogo from Somerville College, Oxford, Skelton's alma mater.
- Johann Gutenberg ― Endymion Spring's master. He is known in the book as Herr Gutenberg by both Peter and Endymion.
- Johann Fust/Faust ― the same character. As a general rule, the name Faust is used in the modern storyline and the name Fust is used in the 15th century storyline. Thought to have sold his soul to the devil.
- Peter Schoeffer ― Fust's apprentice and chosen son-in-law, and the one who thought of the plan for Endymion Spring to escape from Mainz. He was promised Fust's daughter, Christina, a hand in marriage if he did his bidding.
- Christina - Fust's daughter, and Peter's love
- Endymion Spring - The protagonist of the 15th century story line, of the book.

== Reviews ==
April Spisak described the novel as follows:

Unfortunately, the interweaving of perspectives (Blake's story is told in third person, Endymion's is a first-person account) slow the pace and unbalance the narrative with their uneven alternation. In addition, elaborately described bibliophilic details ... may try the patience of some readers. However, Skelton's earnest and daring protagonists may intrigue readers who are able to imagine the literary, and sometimes literal, treasures that could be found in dusty ancient books.

== Matthew Skelton works ==
- The Story of Cirrus Flux
