= The Adventures of Mr. Verdant Green =

1857 novel by Cuthbert Bede

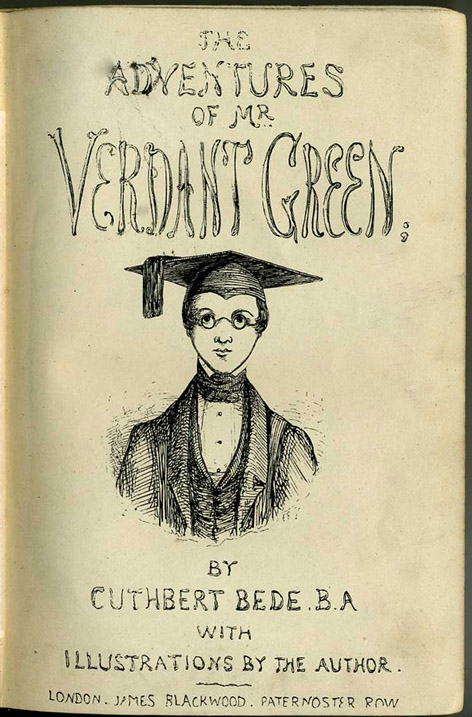
- Title page of early (1870s) printing.
- Author: Cuthbert Bede
- Language: English
- Genre: Fiction
- Publisher: James Blackwood
- Publication date: 1853
- Publication place: United Kingdom

The Adventures of Mr. Verdant Green is a novel by Cuthbert Bede, a pen name of Edward Bradley (1827–1889). It covers the exploits of Verdant Green, a first-year student at Oxford University. Green is an undergraduate at the fictional Brazenface College.

Different editions have varying titles, including Mr Verdant Green: Adventures of an Oxford Freshman. The same characters reappear in a sequel entitled Little Mr Bouncer and his friend Verdant Green.

== Background ==
Verdant Green

The work was first published in three separate parts, in soft covers, by James Blackwood, during the 1850s (1853, 1854 and 1857). Notices in early copies of the book indicate that they were first intended for sale at railway stations, for reading whilst travelling.

Bradley himself had attended University College, Durham (whence his pseudonym), graduating BA in 1848, but then went to Oxford for a year or so, studying to enter the church.

Though Verdant Green has become something of a cult book about Oxford, Bradley had previously produced a series of pen-and-ink drawings entitled "Ye freshmonne his adventures at University College, Durham". He altered the setting on the advice of Mark Lemon at Punch. Drawings of "Durham Student Life" survive in College Life published in Oxford, Cambridge and Durham in 1850.

These drawings were admired by masters like George Cruikshank and John Leech. Hippolyte Taine in his Notes sur l'Angleterre (1872) drew on Bradley's 'Oxford' book for his description of English university life.

Nine chapters of Part III are devoted to Verdant's visit to Northumberland. On the way he passes through Darlington. After mentions of Durham Cathedral and Lord Durham's monument on Penshaw Hill, Verdant and his party pass over Robert Stephenson's (recently completed) High Level Bridge at Newcastle. The location of "Honeywood Hall" has not been identified, but the party visits Warkworth, Alnwick, and Chillingham Castle to see the wild cattle. There is also a trip to Bamburgh and the Longstones light to talk to Grace Darling's father. Verdant eventually gets married here. Bradley clearly knew the area well and paints an attractive picture of the wild landscape and the pleasures of riding, al fresco meals and neighbourly contact, the warmer for being more difficult than in crowded Midland counties. Much amusement is had with local dialect and customs, but it is not condescending and the laugh is usually on Verdant.

== Allusions/references from other works ==
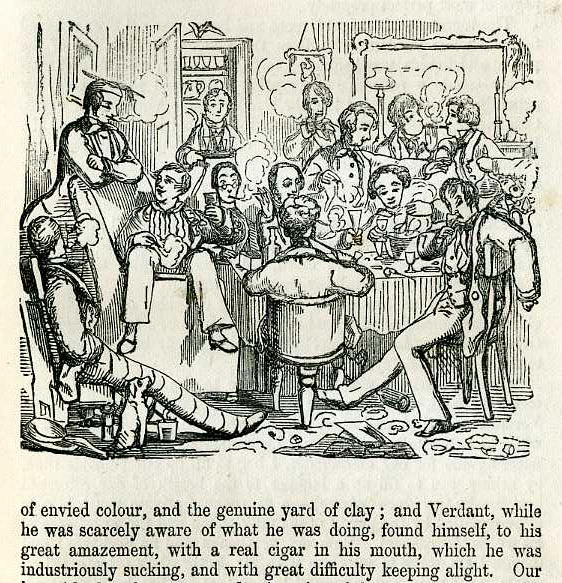
Illustration by the author: The quiet wine party in Mr Smalls' rooms (Verdant Green is seated fourth left, with 'gig-lamps').

- The book includes some classic line-drawing illustrations by the author. The poet John Betjeman reused these in his 1938 book on the university, An Oxford University Chest.
- The name of the College Scout who is responsible for Verdant Green and his room is Robert Filcher. This name was 'borrowed' (or even filched) by M. R. James for a similar character in his ghost story The Mezzotint.

== Editions ==
- The Adventures of Mr Verdant Green (London: James Blackwood) - original.
- The Adventures of Mr. Verdant Green. An Oxford Freshman, Little, Brown, and Company, 1897.
- The Adventures of Mr. Verdant Green. An Oxford Freshman, T. Nelson & Sons, circa 1920.
- The Adventures of Mr. Verdant Green, (with introduction by Anthony Powell). Oxford Paperbacks, 1982. ISBN 0-19-281331-5.
- The Adventures of Mr. Verdant Green, Indypublish.com, 2002. ISBN 1-4043-4264-8 / ISBN 1-4043-4265-6.
- The Adventures of Mr. Verdant Green, Michigan Historical Reprint Series, Scholarly Publishing Office, University of Michigan Library, 2005. ISBN 1-4255-3427-9.
- Mr Verdant Green: Adventures of an Oxford Freshman, Nonsuch Publishing, 2006. ISBN 1-84588-197-4.
