= Mavis Doriel Hay =

British writer (1894–1979)

Mavis Doriel Hay (1894–1979), also known as M. Doriel Hay, was a British author of detective fiction and of non-fiction works on handicrafts.

== Life ==
Hay was born in Potters Bar in Middlesex, England on 12 or 13 February 1894 and attended St Hilda's College, Oxford from 1913 to 1916. Throughout her life, she was interested in the industries and handicrafts of rural Britain. In the late 1920s, she collaborated with Helen Elizabeth Fitzrandolph on a series of works, sponsored by the Agricultural Economics Research Institute of Oxford University, surveying the rural industries of England and Wales. Later in life, under her married name, Mavis Fitzrandolph, she published several works on crafts, particularly quilting.

In the mid-1930s, during the Golden Age of British detective fiction, Hay published three mystery novels, Murder Underground, Death on the Cherwell, and The Santa Klaus Murder. Murder Underground received a positive review in the Sunday Times from Dorothy Sayers, who opined that "[t]his detective novel is much more than interesting. The numerous characters are well differentiated, and include one of the most feckless, exasperating and lifelike literary men that ever confused a trail." Hay's second novel, Death on the Cherwell, appeared in the same year as Sayers' Gaudy Night and, like Gaudy Night, was set in a women's college at Oxford.

The three novels were reprinted in 2013-14 in the "British Library Crime Classics" series.

Hay married Archibald Menzies Fitzrandolph, the brother of her collaborator in the rural industries survey, in 1929. He was killed in a flying accident during World War II. Hay continued to reside in Box, Gloucestershire until her death on 26 August 1979, at the age of 85.

== Selected bibliography ==
=== Mysteries ===
- Murder Underground (1934–35)
- Death on the Cherwell (1935)
- The Santa Klaus Murder (1936)

=== Non-fiction ===
- Rural Industries of England and Wales (with Helen Elizabeth Fitzrandolph) (1929)
- 30 Crafts (as Mavis Fitzrandolph) (1950)
- Landsman Hay: The Memoirs of Robert Hay, 1789-1847 (editor) (1953)
- Traditional Quilting: Its Story and Practice (as Mavis Fitzrandolph) (1954)
- Quilting (as Mavis Fitzrandolph) (1972)
