= Zuleika Dobson =

1911 novel by Max Beerbohm

- Cover for Penguin's 1961 edition of Zuleika Dobson. Illustration by George Him
- Author: Max Beerbohm
- Original title: Zuleika Dobson, or, an Oxford love story
- Language: English
- Genre: Satirical, novel
- Publisher: Heinemann
- Publication date: 26 October 1911
- Publication place: United Kingdom
- Media type: Print

Zuleika Dobson, full title Zuleika Dobson, or, an Oxford love story, is the only novel by English essayist Max Beerbohm, a satire of undergraduate life at Oxford published in 1911. It includes the famous line "Death cancels all engagements" and presents a corrosive view of Edwardian Oxford.

In 1998, the Modern Library ranked Zuleika Dobson 59th on its list of the 100 best English-language novels of the 20th century.

The book largely employs a third-person narrator limited to the character of Zuleika (pronounced "Zu-lee-ka"), then shifting to that of the Duke, then halfway through the novel suddenly becoming a first-person narrator who claims inspiration from the Greek Muse Clio, with her all-seeing narrative perspective provided by Zeus. This allows the narrator to also see the ghosts of notable historical visitors to Oxford, who are present but otherwise invisible to the human characters at certain times in the novel, adding an element of the supernatural.

Robert Mighall in his Afterword to the New Centenary Edition of Zuleika (Collector's Library, 2011), writes: "Zuleika is of the future ... [Beerbohm] anticipates an all-too-familiar feature of the contemporary scene: the D-list talent afforded A-list media attention."

Beerbohm began writing the book in 1898, finishing in 1910, with Heinemann publishing it on 26 October 1911. He saw it not as a novel, but rather as "the work of a leisurely essayist amusing himself with a narrative idea." Sydney Castle Roberts wrote a parody, Zuleika in Cambridge (1941).

== Plot ==
Zuleika Dobson—"though not strictly beautiful"—is a devastatingly attractive young woman of the Edwardian era, a true femme fatale, who is a prestidigitator by profession, formerly a governess. Zuleika's current occupation (though, more importantly, perhaps, her enrapturing beauty) has made her something of a small-time celebrity and she manages to gain entrance to the privileged, all-male domain of Oxford University because her grandfather is the Warden of Judas College (based on Merton College, Beerbohm's alma mater). There, she falls in love for the first time in her life with the Duke of Dorset, a snobbish, emotionally detached student who—frustrated with the lack of control over his feelings when he sees her—is forced to admit that she too is his first love, impulsively proposing to her. As she feels that she cannot love anyone unless he is impervious to her charms, however, she rejects all her suitors, doing the same with the astonished Duke. The Duke quickly discovers that Noaks, another Oxford student, also claims to have fallen in love with her, without ever having even interacted with her. Apparently, men immediately fall in love with her upon seeing her. As the first to have his love reciprocated by her (for however brief a time) the Duke decides that he will commit suicide to symbolise his passion for Zuleika and in hopes that he will raise awareness in her of the terrible power of her bewitching allure, as she innocently goes on crushing men's affections.

Zuleika is able to interrupt the Duke's first suicide attempt from a river boat, but seems to have a romanticised view of men dying for her, and does not oppose the notion of his suicide altogether. The Duke, instead pledging to kill himself the next day—which Zuleika more or less permits—has dinner that night with his social club where the other members also affirm their love for Zuleika. Upon telling them of his plan to die, the others unexpectedly agree also to commit suicide for Zuleika. This idea soon reaches the minds of all Oxford undergraduates, who inevitably fall in love with Zuleika upon first sight.

The Duke eventually decides that the only way he can stop all the undergraduates from killing themselves is by not committing suicide himself, hoping they will follow his example. By an ancient tradition, on the eve of the death of a Duke of Dorset, two black owls come and perch on the battlements of Tankerton Hall, the family seat; the owls remain there hooting through the night and at dawn they fly away to an unknown place. After debating whether to follow through with his suicide, while seeming to decide at last to embrace his life as just as valuable as Zuleika's, the Duke receives a telegram from his butler at Tankerton, reporting the portentous return of the owls. The Duke promptly interprets the omen as a sign that the gods have decreed his doom. He proudly tells Zuleika that he will still die, but no longer for her; she agrees as long as he makes it appear that he is dying for her by shouting her name as he jumps into the river. Later the same day, a thunderstorm overwhelms the Eights Week boat races while the Duke drowns himself in the River Isis, wearing the robes of a Knight of the Garter. Every fellow undergraduate, except one, promptly follows suit.

All of the Oxford undergraduates now dead, including, with some delay, the cowardly Noaks, Zuleika discusses the ordeal with her grandfather, who reveals that he too was enamoured by all when he was her age. While Oxford's academic staff barely notice that nearly all of their undergraduates have vanished, Zuleika decides to order a train for the next morning bound for Cambridge.

== See also ==
- Zuleika (musical)
- Zuleika (legendary)
