= Edward Bradley (writer) =

English clergyman and novelist

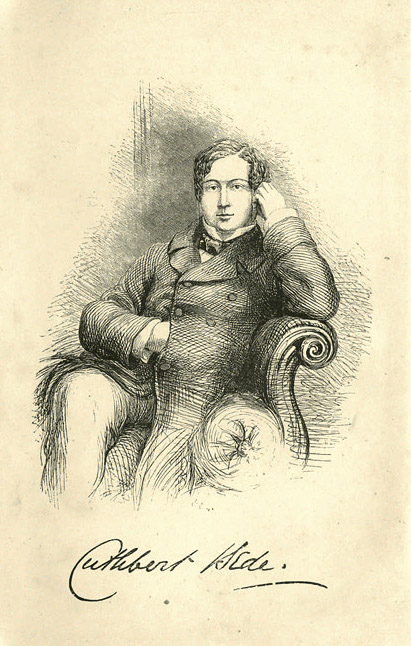
- Self-portrait, frontispiece to The Adventures of Mr. Verdant Green (1870s impression).
- Born: 25 March 1827; Kidderminster, Worcestershire, England
- Died: 12 December 1889 (aged 62)
- Education: University College, Durham
- Occupations: Novelist, clergyman
- Notable work: The Adventures of Mr. Verdant Green

Edward Bradley (25 March 1827 – 12 December 1889) was an English clergyman and novelist. He was born in Kidderminster in Worcestershire, and educated at Durham University from which he took his pen name Cuthbert Bede. His most popular book was The Adventures of Mr. Verdant Green, on the experiences of an Oxford undergraduate. There was a sequel, Little Mr Bouncer and his friend Verdant Green. Tales of College Life (often bound with it), introduces the character of Mr Affable Canary. The celebrated illustrations to the Verdant Green books were the work of the author.

== Life ==
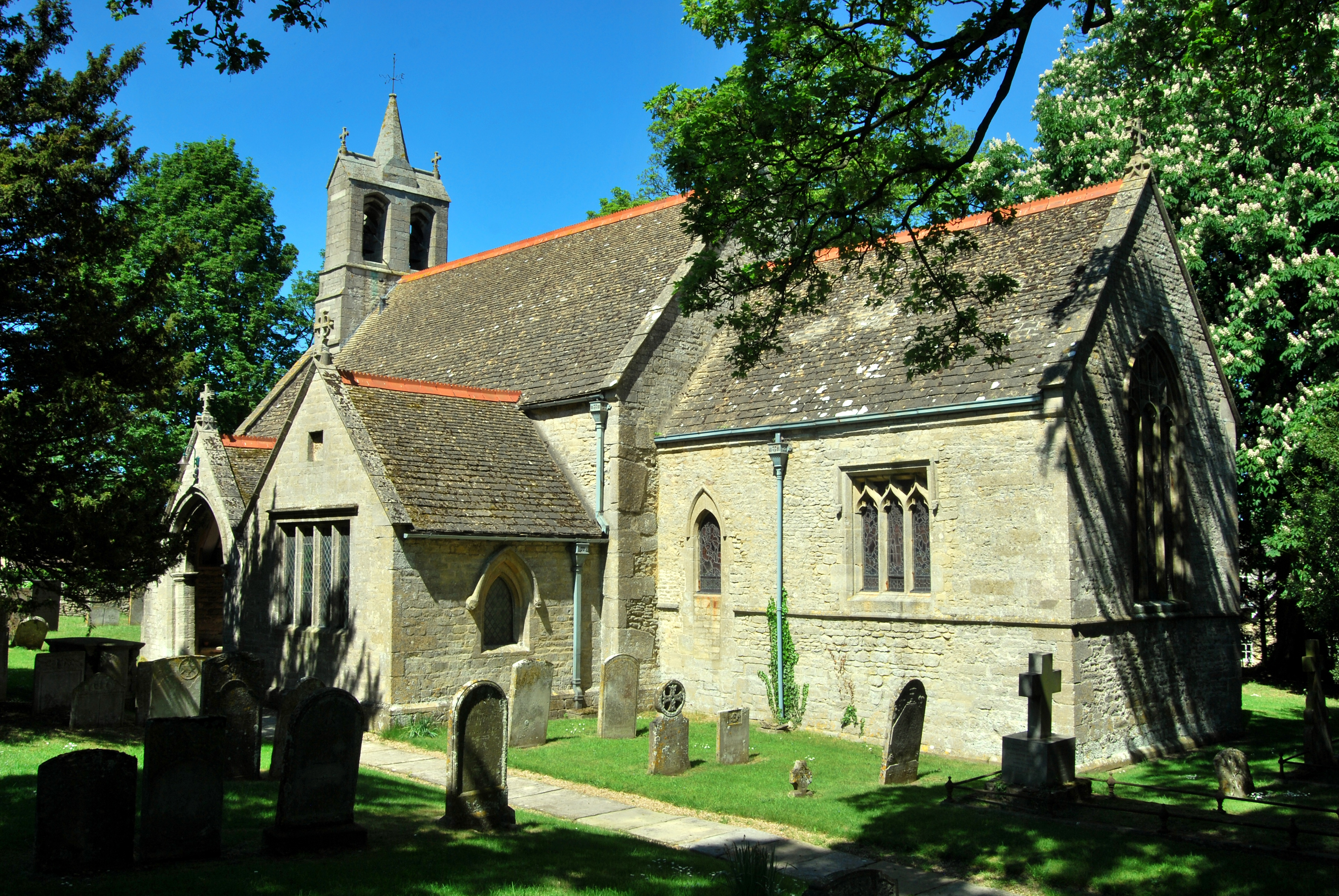
He was buried at St Nicholas' Church, Stretton, in Rutland, which he had restored and where there are stained-glass windows in his memory

He was the second son of Thomas Bradley, surgeon of Kidderminster, who came of a clerical and somewhat ancient Worcestershire family. A brother, Thomas Waldron Bradley, was author of two novels, Grantley Grange (1874) and Nelly Hamilton (1875), while an uncle, William Bradley of Leamington, wrote Sketches of the Poor by a retired Guardian.

After education at the Kidderminster Grammar School, Bradley went up in 1845 to University College, Durham, where he was Thorp Scholar and Foundation Scholar. He graduated B.A. in 1848, and took his licentiateship of theology in 1849. Not being of age to take orders, he appears to have stayed a year at Oxford, pursuing various studies, though he never matriculated, and while there he formed a lifelong friendship with John George Wood.

For a year or so he worked in the clergy schools at Kidderminster. In 1850, he was ordained by the Bishop of Ely, Thomas Turton, and appointed to the curacy of Glatton-with-Holme in Huntingdonshire. He remained there over four years, during which he described for the Illustrated London News the extensive work of draining Whittlesey Mere, then being carried out by William Wells of Holmewood.

In 1857, Bradley was appointed vicar of Donington in Shropshire. From 1859 to 1871, he was rector of Denton-with-Caldecote, Huntingdonshire. In 1871, he became rector of Stretton, Rutland, where he carried through a much-needed restoration of the church, at a cost of nearly £2,000. To raise the funds he gave lectures in Midland towns, and was much in demand as an authority upon Modern Humourists, Wit and Humour and Light Literature.

Bradley was a friend and associate of George Cruikshank, Frank Smedley, Mark Lemon, and Albert Smith (for whose serials, The Month, The Man in the Moon and The Town and Country Miscellany, he began to write about 1850). He generally wrote for the press under the pen name 'Cuthbert Bede', the names of the two patron saints of Durham.

His one marked literary success was obtained in 1853, when he produced The Adventures of Mr. Verdant Green. With numerous illustrations designed and drawn on the wood by the author. Bradley had the greatest difficulty in finding a publisher, but part i. was eventually issued by Nathaniel Cooke of the Strand as one of his shilling Books for the Rail in October 1853. Part ii. appeared in 1854, and part iii. in 1856. The three parts were then bound in one volume, of which 100,000 copies had been sold by 1870; subsequently the book was issued in a sixpenny form, and the sale was more than doubled. The total amount that Bradley received for his work was £350. The three original parts were scarce and fetched over five guineas in 1890. The picture of 'Master Verdant kissing the Maids on the Stairs after his return from Oxford College' was omitted from the later editions.

The Adventures of Mr. Verdant Green contains portraits of Dr. Plumptre, vice-chancellor 1848–62, Dr. Bliss, registrar of the university, and 'the waiter at the Mitre,' while Mr. Bouncer reproduces many traits of the Rev. J. G. Wood. Verdant Green himself is a kind of undergraduate Samuel Pickwick, and the book is full of harmless fun. When we regard the difficulty of the subject, the general fidelity with which one side of university life is depicted, and the fact that Bradley was not himself an Oxford man, we can scarcely refuse a certain measure of genius to the author. Hippolyte Taine used it effectively (together with Pendennis and Tom Brown at Oxford) as material for his tableau of an English university in his Notes sur l'Angleterre. A sequel by Bradley, produced many years later as Little Mr. Bouncer and his friend Verdant Green (1878), did not approach the original in vigour, nor can much success be claimed for the Cambridge rival of Verdant Green, The Cambridge Freshman, or Memoirs of Mr. Golightly (1871), by Martin Legrand (i.e. James Rice), with illustrations by 'Phiz'.

In 1883, on the presentation of Lord Aveland, Bradley left Stretton for the vicarage of Lenton with Hanby, near Grantham. There, as elsewhere, he was indefatigable as a parochial organiser, establishing a free library, a school bank, winter entertainments, and improvement societies.

He died, greatly regretted by all who came into contact with his kindly personality, at the vicarage, Lenton, on 12 December 1889. He was buried in the churchyard of St Nicholas' Church, Stretton, which he had laid out during his incumbency there.

== Family ==
In December 1858 he married Harriet Amelia, youngest daughter of Samuel Hancocks of Wolverley, Worcestershire. He left two sons, the artist Cuthbert Bradley and the Rev. Henry Waldron Bradley. Another son, William Hancocks Bradley, died in 1874, aged 12.

== Works ==
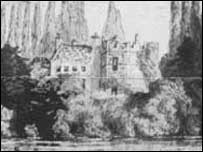
Caldwall Castle, Kidderminster by Cuthbert Bede, 1846

Commencing with Bentley's in 1846, Bradley (as E. B. or 'Cuthbert Bede') contributed to a great number of papers and periodicals, including Punch (1847–55), All the Year Round, Illustrated London Magazine (1853–55), The Field, St. James's and The Gentleman's magazines, Leisure Hour, Quiver, Notes and Queries (1852–1886), The Boy's Own Paper, London Figaro and the Illustrated London News, for which paper he conducted a double acrostic column, commencing 30 August 1856. He claimed to have reintroduced the double acrostic into England.

He wrote under the name of 'Cuthbert Bede, BA' a few novels and tales, Fairy Fables (1858), Glencraggan (1861), Fotheringhay (1885), etc. His most popular book was The Adventures of Mr. Verdant Green, on the experiences of an Oxford undergraduate. There was a sequel, Little Mr Bouncer and his friend Verdant Green. Tales of College Life (often bound with it), introduces the character of Mr Affable Canary. The celebrated illustrations to the Verdant Green books were the work of the author.

== Bibliography ==
- The Adventures of Mr. Verdant Green, an Oxford Freshman at the Internet Archive (3 parts, 1853–57)
- Photographic Pleasures (1855)
- Fairy Fables (1858)
- Glencraggan (1861)
- A Tour in Tartan-land (1863)
- Little Mr Bouncer and his friend, Verdant Green
- Tales of College Life
- The White Wife: With other stories, supernatural, romantic and legendary at the Internet Archive

== Sources ==
- Author and Bookinfo.com
