= Margaret Yorke =

English crime fiction writer

- Born: Margaret Larminie; 30 January 1924; Compton, Surrey, England
- Died: 17 November 2012 (aged 88); Long Crendon, Buckinghamshire, England
- Occupations: Writer; Crime Writers' Association chair (1979–1980)
- Writing career
- Genre: Crime fiction

Margaret Beda Nicholson (née Larminie; 30 January 1924 – 17 November 2012), known professionally as Margaret Yorke, was an English crime fiction writer.

== Life and work ==
Margaret Larminie was born in Compton, Surrey, near Godalming, on 30 January 1924. She spent her childhood in Dublin, moving to England in 1937. During World War II she worked as a hospital librarian, then at eighteen she joined the WRNS as a driver.

She changed to the Yorke pen name to avoid readers' confusion with a similarly-named published family member. She published her first novel Summer Flight in 1957, and in Dead in the Morning invented an Oxford don sleuth, Patrick Grant, who shared her love of Shakespeare. Her last novels were A Case to Answer (2000) and Cause for Concern (2001). Her five Patrick Grant books were reissued as ebooks in 2018. She was chairman of the Crime Writers' Association in 1979–80.

She lived in Long Crendon in Buckinghamshire until her death at the age of 88 on 17 November 2012. She was survived by a son and a daughter.

== Awards ==
Yorke was awarded the 1999 CWA Cartier Diamond Dagger, and the 1982 Martin Beck Award from the Swedish Academy of Detection for The Scent of Fear.

== Patrick Grant novels ==
- Dead in the Morning (1970)
- Silent Witness (1972)
- Grave Matters (1973)
- Mortal Remains (1974)
- Cast for Death (1976)

== Other novels ==
- Summer Flight (1957)
- Pray, Love, Remember (1958)
- Christopher (1959)
- The China Doll (1961)
- Once a Stranger (1962)
- The Birthday (1963)
- Full Circle (1965)
- No Fury (1967)
- The Apricot Bed (1968)
- The Limbo Ladies (1969)
- No Medals for the Major (1974)
- The Small Hours of the Morning (1975)
- The Cost of Silence (1977)
- The Point of Murder (American title The Come-On) (1978)
- Death on Account (1979)
- The Scent of Fear (1980)
- The Hand of Death (1981)
- Devil's Work (1982)
- Find Me a Villain (1983)
- The Smooth Face of Evil (1984)
- Intimate Kill (1985)
- Safely to the Grave (1986)
- Evidence to Destroy (1987)
- Speak for the Dead (1988)
- Deceiving Mirror (1988)
- Crime in Question (1989)
- Admit to Murder (1990)
- A Small Deceit (1991)
- Criminal Damage (1992)
- Dangerous to Know (1993)
- Almost the Truth (1994)
- Serious Intent (1995)
- A Question of Belief (1996)
- Act of Violence (1997)
- False Pretenses (1998)
- The Price of Guilt (1999)
- A Case to Answer (2000)
- Cause for Concern (2001)
