= Brunette Coleman =

Pseudonym used by the poet and writer Philip Larkin

Idealised illustration of an early 20th-century English schoolgirl

Brunette Coleman was a pseudonym used by the poet and writer Philip Larkin. In 1943, towards the end of his time as an undergraduate at St John's College, Oxford, he wrote several works of fiction, verse and critical commentary under that name, including homoerotic stories that parody the style of popular writers of contemporary girls' school fiction.

The Coleman oeuvre consists of a completed novella, Trouble at Willow Gables, set in a girls' boarding school; an incomplete sequel, Michaelmas Term at St Brides, set in a women's college at Oxford; seven short poems with a girls' school ambience; a fragment of pseudo-autobiography; and a critical essay purporting to be Coleman's literary apologia. The manuscripts were stored in the Brynmor Jones Library at the University of Hull, where Larkin was chief librarian between 1955 and 1985. Their existence was revealed to the public when Larkin's Selected Letters and Andrew Motion's biography were published in 1992 and 1993 respectively. The Coleman works themselves were finally published, with other Larkin drafts and oddments, in 2002.

At Oxford Larkin underwent a period of confused sexuality and limited literary output. The adoption of a female persona appeared to release his creativity, as in the three years following the Coleman phase he published under his own name two novels and his first poetry collection. Thereafter, although he gradually established his reputation as a poet, his career as a prose writer declined, and despite several attempts he completed no further fiction. Critical reaction to the publication of the Coleman material was divided between those who saw no value in these juvenilia, and those who considered that they cast useful light on the study of the mature Larkin.

== Origins ==
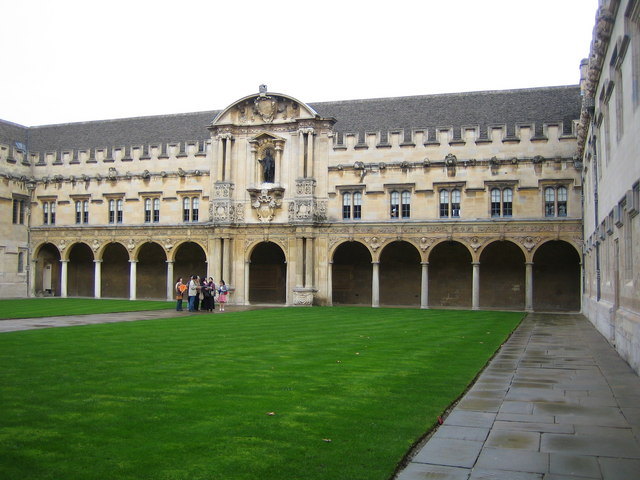
The quadrangle, St John's College, Oxford

In October 1940 Philip Larkin began studying English at St John's College, Oxford. A prolific writer since childhood, his primary ambition as an undergraduate was to be a novelist rather than a poet. As well as publishing articles and poems in Cherwell and Oxford Poetry, he wrote additional unpublished material that included fragments of semi-autobiographical stories exploring homosexual relationships among groups of undergraduates. According to Larkin's biographer Andrew Motion these writings, while of no literary value, give an indication of Larkin's confused sexuality at that time, and his growing distaste for what he terms "this buggery business".

From 1942 the character of much of Larkin's private writing changed, as a result of his friendship with a fellow undergraduate from St John's, Kingsley Amis, who arrived at the university that summer. Amis, a much more confident and assertive character than Larkin, disguised his serious concerns behind a facade of jokes and comic ironies. Larkin soon adopted that style as his own, joining with Amis in composing obscene rhymes and parodies of the Romantic poets they were required to study. In time they extended their efforts to soft-porn fantasies in which, typically, "girls roll[ed] around together twanging elastic and straps". After Amis's departure for the army in early 1943, Larkin made his first attempt at writing from a specifically feminine perspective in a story called "An Incident in the English Camp", which he subtitled "A Thoroughly Unhealthy Story". Lacking any salacious content despite its subtitle, the work is written in a pastiche of sentimental women's magazine prose. It depicts an undergraduate girl's parting from her soldier lover, and ends: "She walked in exaltation through the black streets, her heart glowing like a coal with deep love".

== Writing ==
From his general reading, Larkin had acquired a considerable knowledge of girls' school fiction, and had formed definite views on the authors of such works: "stupid women without a grain of humour in their minds", who lacked "erotic sensibility" and treated the lesbian perspective "too casually". His intention to write in this genre is expressed in a letter to his friend Norman Iles, dated 5 June 1943, just before Larkin sat his degree Finals: "I am spending my time doing an obscene Lesbian novel in the form of a school story". The novel was Trouble at Willow Gables, a school adventure story in the manner of Dorita Fairlie Bruce or Dorothy Vicary, which Larkin completed at home while awaiting his Finals results. That was the prelude to a busy summer's writing: "Leaving Oxford was like taking a cork out of a bottle. Writing flooded out of me", Larkin later told his biographer.

Larkin's letter to Iles does not mention a female pseudonym, although the idea of using one had been in his mind for months. The previous March he had begun writing the imagined autobiography of a supposed lady novelist, "Brunette Coleman", adapting the name of a well-known contemporary female jazz musician, Blanche Coleman. Larkin tentatively titled the autobiography "Ante Meridian"; he soon abandoned it, but held on to the Coleman name. According to James Booth, who prepared the Coleman texts for publication in 2002, the adoption of a female persona was in line with the pose of "girlish narcissism" that Larkin was affecting in the summer of 1943: "I am dressed in red trousers, shirt and white pullover, and look very beautiful". In his letters to Amis, Larkin maintained a straight-faced pretence that Coleman was a real person. Thus in one letter he wrote "Brunette is very thrilled" with a poem written in her name, and in another, "Brunette can stand healthy criticism".

As he waited for offers of employment through the summer and autumn of 1943, Larkin added more works to the Coleman oeuvre. He began a sequel to Trouble at Willow Gables, set in a women's college at Oxford and entitled Michaelmas Term at St Bride's, but did not finish it: "All literary inspiration has deserted me", he informed Amis on 13 August. Nevertheless, a week later he told Amis that Brunette was helping him to write a novel, provisionally entitled Jill, about "a young man who invents an imaginary sister, and falls in love with her". With this letter Larkin sent a Coleman poem, "Bliss", the first of seven written in the girls' school idiom. As late as 19 October he reported to Amis that "Brunette is working on a little monograph about girls' school stories". This is a reference to the putative literary manifesto "What Are We Writing For", which became the final Coleman work. Thereafter, Motion records, she disappeared, "to be mentioned only fleetingly in later accounts of his university life ... She ended up as an occasional comic reminder of lost youth".

== Works ==
The works which Larkin attributed to Brunette Coleman comprise a short piece of supposed autobiography, a complete short novel, an incomplete second novel, a collection of poems and a literary essay.

=== "Ante Meridian" ===
This fragment of spoof autobiography is distinct from the rest of the Coleman oeuvre in having no relation to girls' school fiction. It records Brunette's early life as the daughter of an eccentric priest, brought up in a tumbledown Cornish cliff-top house. Apart from descriptions of the house and its contents (some of which may be drawn from Larkin's own childhood home in Coventry), much of the narrative is taken up with a comical description of an attempt to launch the local lifeboat. Larkin's biographer Richard Bradford is struck by the distinctive tone in the fragment, different from anything else written under Coleman's name. The text breaks off suddenly; Motion surmises that Larkin abandoned it because he was eager to begin work on the first Coleman novel. Booth describes the prose as "a mix of Daphne du Maurier nostalgia and surreal farce".

=== Novel: Trouble at Willow Gables ===
==== Synopsis ====
Emotional friendships between girls are characteristic of Brunette Coleman's school fiction.

Marie Moore, a junior pupil at Willow Gables, receives a birthday present of £5 from an aunt. After the banknote is retained for safekeeping by the headmistress, Miss Holden, Marie slyly recovers it but is quickly found out, and is coerced by Miss Holden into giving the money to the school's gymnasium fund. When later the banknote goes missing from the fund's collection box, Marie is suspected, but protests her innocence despite a savage beating from Miss Holden with assistance from two burly school prefects. Only her friend Myfanwy believes her. Confined in the school's punishment room, Marie manages to escape with the help of a domestic servant, and runs away.

Hilary Russell, a prefect and predatory lesbian, lusts after Mary Beech, the school's cricket captain. On a night expedition in pursuit of Mary, Hilary catches Margaret Tattenham, a junior, in the act of replacing the £5 note in Miss Holden's room. Margaret says she originally took the money as a prank; Hilary agrees not to report her to Miss Holden in return for sexual favours, to which Margaret reluctantly consents. The following morning, Hilary denounces her anyway; Margaret responds by revealing Hilary's sexual harassment but is not believed, and is taken to the punishment room where Marie's absence is revealed.

Hilary is sent with a search party to find the missing girl. Meanwhile, Margaret makes a daring escape via the window, and rides off on the school horse. She finds Marie, who is miserable and frightened and wants to return to the school whatever the consequences. Margaret confesses that she borrowed the £5 to bet on a horse, and has won £100. She means to leave Willow Gables for good, and apologises to Marie for the trouble she has caused her. This conversation is overheard by Hilary's search party, and after a scuffle the truants are captured. On the way back to school they hear cries from the river; it is Myfanwy, who has got into difficulties while swimming. Margaret frees herself from her captors' clutches, dives in and saves her drowning friend.

Back at the school, Miss Holden overlooks the theft in view of Margaret's heroism, although she confiscates the £100 winnings and donates the money to a new swimming pool fund. Marie is exonerated, and her £5 is returned. Mary Beech comes forward to corroborate Margaret's accusations against Hilary, who is summarily expelled. Marie and Myfanwy enjoy an emotional reunion in the school sickroom, as life at the school returns to normal, with friendship and forgiveness all round.

==== Commentary ====
The typescript begins with a dedication page "To Jacinth" (Brunette Coleman's imagined secretary). There follows an untitled poem which later appears, slightly altered, as "The School in August" in Sugar and Spice, the Coleman poetry collection. In the story the surnames of the headmistress and principal girls have been altered in ink throughout the typescript; some of the original names belonged to Larkin's real-life acquaintances at Oxford. The presence of a publisher's inkstamp on the wallet containing the typescript indicates that the story may have been submitted by Larkin for publication.

Booth argues that, whatever Larkin's motive in writing it, the story follows the parameters of schoolgirl fiction with some fidelity. Its main characters all have models within the genre; Marie has much in common with Dorita Fairlie Bruce's recurrent character "Dimsie", while Hilary is likewise based on Dorothy Vicary's villainous "Una Vickers" in Niece of the Headmistress. The usual themes of friendships, rivalries and injustices are explored, and the ending in reconciliation and future hope is entirely true to type. Some scenes—the savage beating endured by Marie, the lingering descriptions of girls dressing and undressing, Hilary's smouldering sexuality—may, Booth asserts, be written with "the lusts of the male heterosexual gaze" in mind but, he continues, the reader looking for explicit pornography will be disappointed. Bradford notes three prose styles combining in the narrative: "cautious indifference, archly overwritten symbolism ... and ... its writer's involuntary feelings of sexual excitement". Motion finds the tone of the prose frivolous on the surface, yet fundamentally cold and cruel: "Once its women have been arraigned for pleasure they are dismissed; once they have been enjoyed they are treated with indifference".

=== Novel: Michaelmas Term at St Bride's ===
==== Synopsis ====
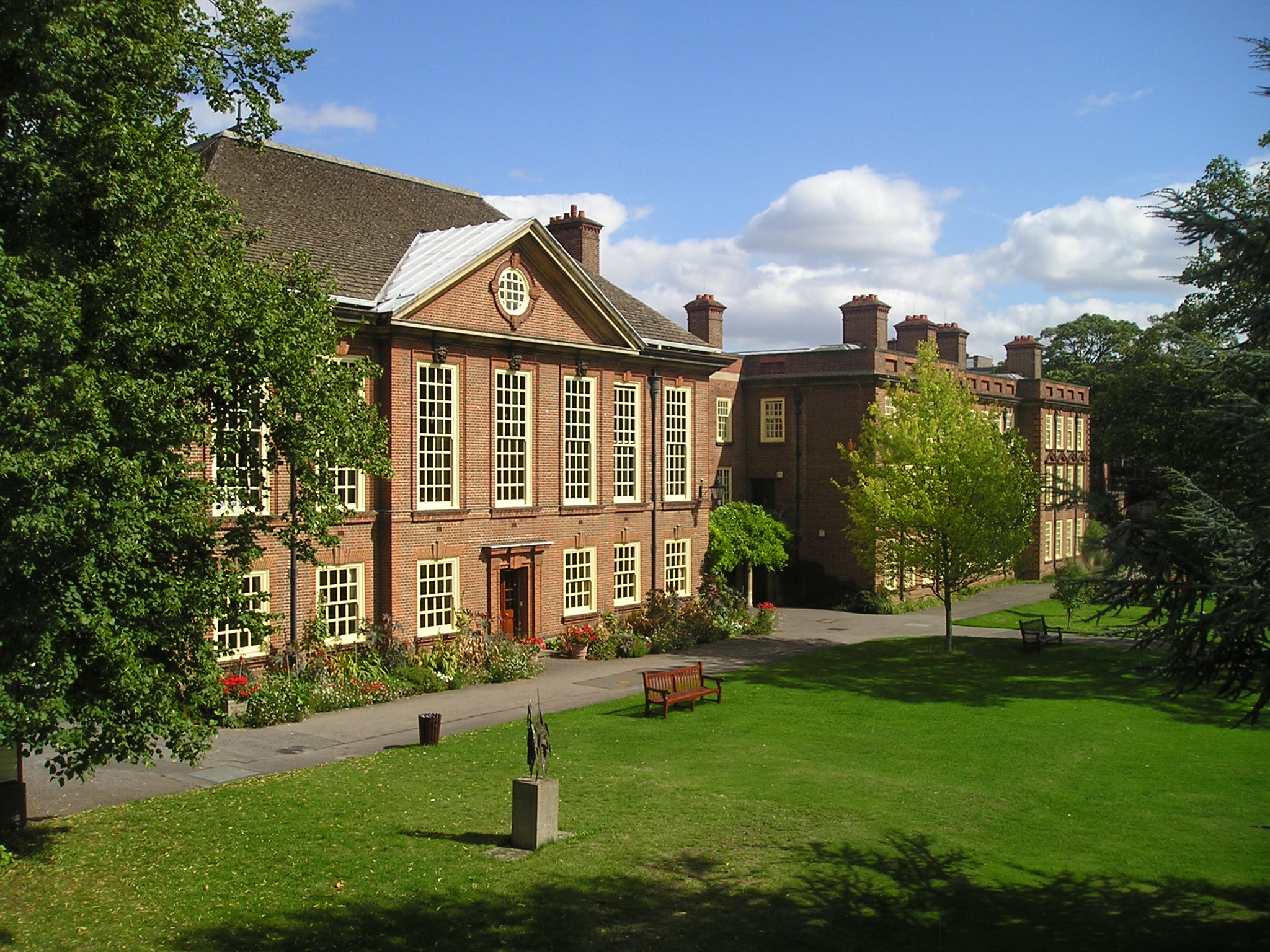
Somerville College, Oxford, the recognisable model for St Bride's

In this incomplete story Mary, Marie, Margaret and Myfanwy, friends from Willow Gables, are new undergraduates at St Bride's College, Oxford. Mary is disconcerted to find that she is sharing her rooms with Hilary, her old adversary from the school. However, although Hilary still has a roving lesbian eye, she has lost most of her predatory instincts and the two become friends. Mary falls foul of Mary de Putron, the aggressive and authoritarian college games captain; in the hockey trials de Putron makes Mary play out of her normal position, so that performs badly. Hilary subsequently avenges Mary's humiliation by seducing de Putron's boyfriend, a gauche Royal Air Force officer called Clive, whom she then dumps unceremoniously.

Of Myfanwy's doings we learn relatively little. Margaret, still fascinated with horse-racing, sets up her own bookmaking business. Marie discovers psychoanalysis and tries to cure her sister Philippa's leather belt fetish. After various efforts prove unsuccessful, the sisters seek solace in alcohol. The later stages of the story introduce Larkin's real-life friend, Diana Gollancz, and recount her preparations for a fashionable party. In the final scenes the narrative becomes surreal, as on their alcoholic quest Marie and Philippa are confronted by the knowledge that they are characters in a story, while "real life" is going on in the next room. Marie takes a peep at real life, and decides she would rather stay in the story, which breaks off at this point with a few pencil notes indicating possible ways in which it might have continued.

==== Commentary ====
Only the first dozen pages of the manuscript are typed; the remainder is handwritten. The surnames of the characters, which were changed in Trouble at Willow Gables, are unaltered. The script carries a dedication to "Miriam and Diana": Miriam was an acquaintance with whom Larkin had discussed lesbian relationships, while Diana Gollancz ("Diana G." in the story), the daughter of the publisher Victor Gollancz, supplied him with many anecdotes from her schooldays. According to Motion, "St Bride's" is recognisably based on Somerville College, Oxford.

In his analysis of the Coleman fiction, Stephen Cooper notes that, as with Willow Gables, the narrative voice switches from character to character so that different thoughts, attitudes and perspectives can be expressed. Cooper argues that as the narrative progresses, Larkin's concerns (in his Coleman voice) move beyond sexual titillation; he is no longer interested in describing lesbian encounters in voyeuristic detail. Hilary emerges as saviour rather than seducer, as a campaigner against male oppression, and as a figure who "deviates from the cultural norms [yet] can triumph over those who adopt conventional attitudes". The scenes with sexual content or innuendo are largely confined to the earlier parts of the story. The later parts, which introduce the male characters "Clive" and Hilary's other admirer, the contemptible "Creature" are, according to Motion, overlaid with male self-disgust, a theme apparent in Larkin's two published novels and in his later poetry. Motion suggests that the loss of erotic impetus, and Larkin's apparent fading of interest, are the main reasons why the story peters out.

=== Sugar and Spice: A Sheaf of Poems ===
The typescript of Sugar and Spice consists of six poems, which in sequence are:

1. "The False Friend"
2. "Bliss"
3. "Femmes Damnées"
4. "Ballade des Dames du Temps Jadis"
5. "Holidays"
6. "The School in August"

A seventh poem in pencil, "Fourth Form Loquitur", has been loosely inserted into the typescript. "Femmes Damnées", which was printed by John Fuller at the Sycamore Press, Oxford, in 1978, is the only Coleman work published in Larkin's lifetime. This poem, and "The School in August", were included in Larkin's Collected Poems published in 1988; "The School in August" was omitted from the 2003 revised edition of the collection although, according to Amis, it is the poem that best gives the flavour of the Coleman pastiche. "Bliss" was included in Larkin's Selected Letters (1992), as part of a letter to Amis.

Motion describes the Coleman poems as "a world of comfortless jealousies, breathless bike-rides and deathless crushes", mixing elements from writers and poets such as Angela Brazil, Richmal Crompton, John Betjeman and W.H. Auden. Larkin's own attitude to these poems appears equivocal. He expresses pleasure that his friend Bruce Montgomery liked them, especially "The School in August". However, to Amis he writes: "I think all wrong-thinking people ought to like them. I used to write them whenever I'd seen any particularly ripe schoolgirl ... Writing about grown women is less perverse and therefore less satisfying". Booth finds the poems the most impressive of all the Coleman works, in their evidence of Larkin's early ability to create striking and moving images from conventional school story clichés. They are an early demonstration of Larkin's talent for finding depths in ordinariness, an ability that characterised many of his later poems. Booth draws specific attention to the elegiac quality of the final lines of "The School in August": "And even swimming groups can fade / Games mistresses turn grey". In Booth's view the Coleman poems are among the best Larkin wrote in the 1940s, well beyond anything in his first published selection The North Ship (1945).

=== "What Are We Writing For" ===
The typescript of the essay is headed by an epigraph, attributed to The Upbringing of Daughters by Catherine Durning Whethem. It reads: "The chief justification of reading books of any sort is the enlargement of experience that should accrue therefrom". The text which follows is, in Motion's words, "a homily on how and how not to write for children". It argues for the need for well-drawn heroines, and for unrepentant villainesses: "To be tenacious in evil is the duty of every villain ... Let her hate the heroine wholeheartedly, and refuse, yes, even on the last page, to take her hand in forgiveness". The story should not be about schoolgirls, but about a school with girls in it. The school must be English; foreign settings or trips abroad are disparaged. Larkin, in Coleman's voice, pleads for "the Classic Unities": Unity of Place, which is the school and its inhabitants; Unity of Time, normally the term in which the action occurs; and Unity of Action, whereby every recorded incident contributes in some way to the telling of the story. The essay is laden with quotations from many writers of the genre, among them Joy Francis, Dorita Fairlie Bruce, Elsie J. Oxenham, Elinor Brent-Dyer and Nancy Breary.

Motion argues that aside from the sometimes facetious tone, the opinions expressed by Larkin in his Coleman persona, particularly the mild xenophobia that enters the essay, foreshadow his own mature prejudices. Bradford believes that the essay reads as a serious, well-researched paper on the genre of early twentieth century boarding school literature, worthy of inclusion in F. W. Bateson's Essays and Criticism had that journal existed in 1943.

== Critical reception ==
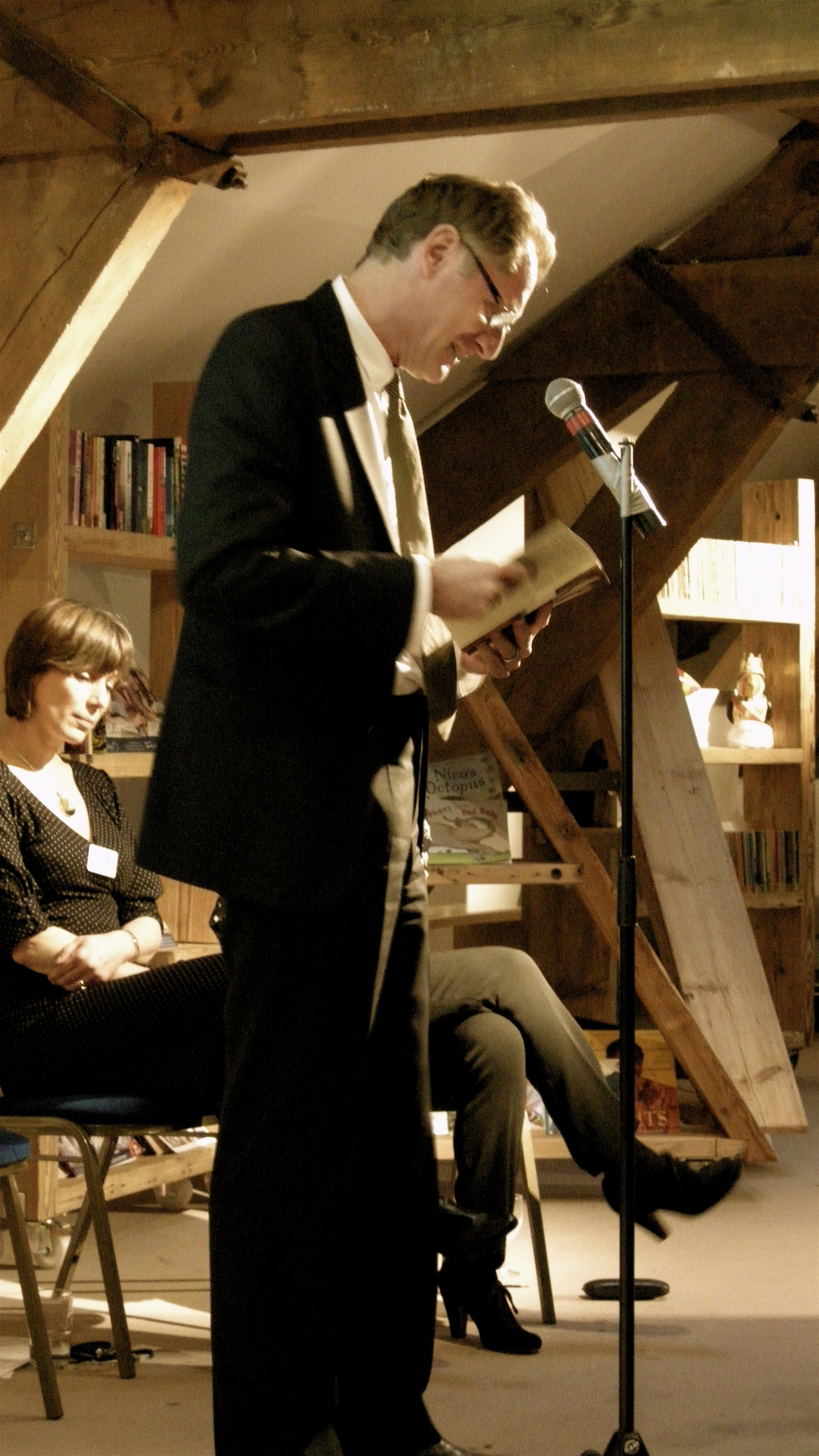
Andrew Motion, Larkin's biographer, who made public the existence of the "Brunette Coleman" works

Shortly before his death in 1985 Larkin instructed his companion Monica Jones to burn his diaries. His instructions did not cover other writings, therefore the Coleman material remained in the archives of the Brynmor Jones Library at the University of Hull, where Larkin had worked as chief librarian since 1955. The existence of these papers was first made public in 1992, when Larkin's Selected Letters was published. In the following year extensive extracts from the Coleman works appeared in Motion's biography of Larkin, and became the subject of literary analysis by M. W. Rowe, in his 1999 essay "Unreal Girls: Lesbian Fantasy in Early Larkin". Rowe saw Larkin's adoption of a female persona as an outlet, compensating for his sexual awkwardness and lack of success with Oxford women. The punishment scenes, in which women punish women, were a means of subduing Larkin's feelings of anger and frustration with his personal sexual failures. More significantly, according to Rowe, Larkin's invention of Coleman was the catalyst which broke the writing block that had afflicted him for most of his Oxford years. The few months of her creative life in 1943 were, Larkin later acknowledged, the prelude to "the intensest time of my life"; in the three subsequent years his poetry collection The North Ship and his novels Jill and A Girl in Winter were published.

The complete Coleman material, in a collection edited by James Booth, was finally published in 2002. Booth thought that the material would probably cause "a huge amount of confusion and smoke because the politically correct brigade will jump on it". Anticipating the publication, Emma Hartley and Vanessa Thorpe in The Observer doubted the literary value of the works, citing Motion's view that the stories were "little more than mild pornography" which the mature poet would never have wished to see published. On publication, Booth's collection provoked a particularly hostile reaction from The Guardian's critic Jenny Diski, whose review dismissed the Coleman writings as "drivel" and "sad ramblings", unworthy of publication or critical attention, and not even valid pornography: "Not a breast, not a clitoris is seen or mentioned." Unlike serious pornographers, "Larkin sketches a mere outline and then walks away with a snigger". Diski mocks Booth's reverential descriptions of the typescripts "as though they were slivers of the True Cross", and concludes: "Let this be a lesson, at least, to anyone who hasn't got around to chucking out the crap they wrote in their teens and early twenties."

Other critics were more positive. The New Statesman's Robert Potts found the stories "entertaining and intriguing for readers familiar with their background and with the genre", and for the most part charmingly innocent, "especially when compared with the reality of boarding-school life". The evocation of adolescent homoeroticism was deliberate and playful rather than pornographic. In a similar vein, Richard Canning in The Independent found the Willow Gables fiction vibrant, well-constructed and entertaining, and praised Larkin's "sly Sapphic spin". In a more recent analysis Terry Castle, writing in the journal Daedalus, disagrees profoundly with the notion expressed by Adam Kirsch in The Times Literary Supplement, that the publication of the Coleman works was damaging to Larkin's reputation. On the contrary, argues Castle, "the Brunette phase speaks volumes about the paradoxical process by which Philip Larkin became 'Larkinesque'—modern English poetry's reigning bard of erotic frustration and depressive (if verse-enabling) self-deprecation".

== Influences ==
The effects of Larkin's Coleman phase are clearly evident in his first novel, Jill, in which he makes copious use of Willow Gables material. The novelist's protagonist, a shy Oxford undergraduate called John Kemp, invents a schoolgirl sister called Jill, initially to impress his arrogant and dismissive room-mate, Christopher Warner. Although Warner displays little interest, the non-existent "Jill" comes to obsess Kemp. He imagines her at Willow Gables School, and writes long letters to her there. In the form of a short story he details her life at the school—now located in Derbyshire rather than Wiltshire as it had been in the Coleman works. (Note: The initial page of the St Brides story gives the Willow Gables address as "near Mallerton, Wilts".) The girls' names are different, but their speech and attitudes closely reflect those of the earlier stories. A lesbian element is introduced through Jill's fascination with the cool, detached senior girl Minerva Strachey. Kemp's fantasy is disturbed when he meets a real-life Jill, or Gillian; his attempts to match his flight of fancy to reality end in embarrassment and humiliation. (Note: The Willow Gables material in Jill is included between pages 116 and 152 of the 1975 Faber and Faber paperback edition, ISBN 0-571-10691-9)

Reviewing the published Coleman material, The Independent's Richard Canning suggests that the influence of these early works is often discernible in Larkin's poetry. Likewise Stephen Cooper, in his 2004 book Philip Larkin: Subversive Writer, argues that the stylistic and thematic influences of Trouble at Willow Gables and Michaelmas Term at St Brides anticipate the poetry's recurrent concern with rebellion and conformity. Among examples, Cooper cites Marie's refusal in Willow Gables to compromise with an unjust authority as reflecting the sentiments expressed in Larkin's poem "Places, Loved Ones" (1954). The reader, says Cooper, "is invited to identify with Marie's plight in a manner that foreshadows the empathy felt for the rape victim in 'Deception'" (1950). When Marie, having escaped from the school, discovers that her freedom is an illusion, she longs to return to the familiar paths. These sentiments are present in poems such as "Poetry of Departures" (1954), "Here" (1961), and "High Windows" (1967).

The spirit though not the name of Brunette was briefly revived during 1945–46, when Larkin renewed his friendship with Amis. Among the stillborn projects planned by the pair was a story about two beautiful jazz-loving lesbian undergraduates. According to Booth, the "feeble plot [was] merely the excuse for lesbian scenes ... far indeed from the originality of Larkin's Brunette works of 1943". Jill, completed in 1944, was finally published in October 1946 by The Fortune Press, whose eccentric proprietor Reginald Caton reportedly accepted the book without reading it. Larkin was disappointed by the book's critical reception, but by this time his second novel, A Girl in Winter, had been accepted by Faber and Faber, and was duly published in February 1947. It received better reviews than Jill, and achieved moderately good sales; Booth calls it Larkin's "most original and adventurous experiment in fiction". It is written from the viewpoint of its main female character, Katherine, but otherwise is unrelated to the Coleman phase. Over the following years Larkin began but failed to finish several more novels, in the last of which, A New World Symphony, he returned once again to the device of a female protagonist-narrator. The novel was finally abandoned around 1954.

== Notes and references ==
Notes

== Sources ==
- Amis, Kingsley (1991). Memoirs. London: Hutchinsons. ISBN 0-09-174533-0.
- Booth, James, ed. (2002). Philip Larkin: Trouble at Willow Gables and Other Fictions. London: Faber and Faber. ISBN 0-571-20347-7.
- Bradford, Richard (2005). First Boredom, Then Fear: The Life of Philip Larkin. London and Chester Springs: Peter Owen. ISBN 0-7206-1147-4.
- Cooper, Stephen (2004). Philip Larkin: Subversive writer. Brighton: Sussex Academic Press. ISBN 1-84519-000-9.
- Motion, Andrew (1993). Philip Larkin: A Writer's Life. London: Faber and Faber. ISBN 0-571-15174-4.
- Rowe, M.W. (2000). Unreal Girls: Lesbian Fantasy in Early Larkin in New Larkins for Old ed. James Booth. Basingstoke and New York: Palgrave. ISBN 0-333-76107-3.
- Thwaite, Anthony (1992). Selected Letters of Philip Larkin. London: Faber and Faber. ISBN 0-571-15197-3.
