= Tom Brown at Oxford =

Novel by Thomas Hughes

- Cover of 1885 Macmillan and Company edition.
- Author: Thomas Hughes
- Illustrator: Sydney Prior Hall
- Language: English
- Genre: Novel
- Publisher: Macmillan
- Publication date: 1861
- Publication place: England
- Media type: Print (Hardback & Paperback)
- Pages: 599
- Preceded by: Tom Brown's School Days

Tom's "Wine" in honour of his Father. "The Squire, who has been carefully planted by Tom with his back to the death warrant, enjoys himself very much."—P. 464. Frontispiece by Sydney Prior Hall from the 1885 Macmillan and Company edition of Tom Brown at Oxford

Title page from the 1885 Macmillan and Company edition of Tom Brown at Oxford

Tom Brown at Oxford is a novel by Thomas Hughes, first published in serial form in Macmillan's Magazine in 1859. It was published in two volumes in book form in 1861. It is a sequel to the better-known Tom Brown's School Days.

The story follows the character of Tom Brown to a fictional St Ambrose's College, Oxford. The novel offers a vivid impression of university life in the mid nineteenth century.

The book was out of print for many years but is available in Britain from Wordsworth Classics with 'Tom Brown's Schooldays' and is now available on the Project Gutenberg ebook site. Editions of the serialized form are available at the HathiTrust.

The illustrator Sydney Prior Hall (1842–1922), a portrait painter and illustrator, was one of the leading reportage artists of the later Victorian period.
