= A Staircase in Surrey =

A Staircase in Surrey is a sequence of five novels by Scottish novelist and academic J. I. M. Stewart (1906–1994), and published between 1974 and 1978 by Victor Gollancz in London. The word "Surrey" in the title of the quintet refers to student accommodation in an imaginary Oxford college. (A staircase, in the more traditionally designed colleges, is a group of students' rooms, with a ground-floor entrance leading off a quadrangle.)

== The series ==
The books, in order of publication, are:

- The Gaudy (1974)
- Young Pattullo (1975)
- A Memorial Service (1976)
- The Madonna of the Astrolabe (1977)
- Full Term (1978)

== Plot ==
The narrator and central character is playwright Duncan Pattullo, son of Lachlan Pattullo, a noted Scottish artist specializing in landscapes but occasionally painting portraits. He is educated in Edinburgh, at a school clearly intended to recall Fettes, and then at the unnamed College in Oxford (of which Surrey is one of the quadrangles) as the John Ruskin Scholar.

In the first novel of the sequence, The Gaudy, Pattullo returns to his Oxford College, after a long absence (and a successful career as a playwright, including extended residence abroad), and encounters a number of old friends, including Albert Talbert, his former tutor in English Literature; Lord Marchpayne, formerly Tony Mumford (an undergraduate contemporary who lived in the set of rooms opposite his); fellow Scot and schoolmate Ranald McKechnie, now Regius Professor of Greek at the college (McKechnie's wife, Janet, is Duncan's first love); Cyril Bedworth (now the college's Senior Tutor but formerly an undergraduate friend who lived at the top of Pattullo's staircase); and Robert Damien (College doctor, but also a contemporary of Pattullo's who embarrassed him by replacing the sketch for a famous painting that he owned with a bawdy picture of Mumford's at exactly the point when the great and the good had assembled to view it).

The second novel, Young Pattullo, tells the story of their former relationships and Pattullo's undergraduate career. In A Memorial Service Pattullo is instrumental in resolving the crisis caused by the academic insufficiency and aggressively anti-institutional behaviour of Ivo Mumford, his friend Tony's son, and begins a tentative involvement with his cousin Fiona Petrie, a don at one of the women's Colleges, as well as rekindling a friendship with Janet McKechnie. The title refers obliquely to the character of Paul Lusby, who committed suicide in the first novel as a result of a foolish wager proposed by Ivo Mumford, and whose brother Peter is seeking admission to the College, partly in memory of his brother. In The Madonna of the Astrolabe Pattullo has to cope with his ex-wife and her sexual designs on current undergraduates, the undergraduates' production of Tamburlaine, and the problems of raising enough money for the urgently needed restoration of the crumbling Great Tower (modelled on Tom Tower). The discovery of a lost masterpiece by Piero della Francesca proves crucial to the college's future fortunes, and Pattullo is able to help when it is stolen. Full Term takes up Pattullo's emotional conflicts but focuses on the scandalous, and apparently treasonous, behaviour of the College's Physics tutor, William Watershute, which are dramatically resolved at the end.

== Roman à clef ==
A Staircase in Surrey functions partly as a Roman à clef, with multiple allusions to thinly veiled people and places. The College, which is not named in the novels, is very clearly based on one of Stewart's own Colleges, Christ Church, where he was Student (i.e. Fellow and Tutor) from 1949 until 1973, and University Reader in English. Surrey is modelled on Peckwater Quadrangle, which houses the College library as the novels suggest, but does not have a statue of a former Head of House (in the middle of Surrey there is a statue of Provost Harbage). The character of the Provost (Head of the College) is based on that of Henry Chadwick, Dean of Christ Church, Oxford during Stewart's own time there. His name is taken from that of Edward Pococke (1604–91), seventeenth century Regius Professor of Hebrew (1648–91), after whom the Pococke Tree (the inspiration for Lewis Carroll's Jabberwocky) and the Pococke Garden in Christ Church are named. The fantasy writer and Oxford don J. R. R. Tolkien appears (or is remembered) as the elderly "Professor J. B. Timbermill" in all the novels. The character of Arnold Lempriere, an ancient and semi-retired history don at the College, is based on the eccentric Christ Church Censor R. H. Dundas. Tony Mumford's title "Marchpayne" is obviously both a nod to the Marquess of Marchmain, a character in Evelyn Waugh's Brideshead Revisited (another novel partly set in Christ Church, Oxford), but also a joke on "marchpane", an old name for marzipan. Stewart makes an oblique reference to himself in Full Term: 'the other [new fellow], bald and abraded, was understood to have escaped in middle age from some professorial assignment in the antipodes' (p. 37) – Stewart had been Jury Professor of English at the University of Adelaide before obtaining his post in Christ Church.

== Evaluation ==
Stewart's sequence of novels is much appreciated for his learned allusiveness and the sheer polish of his narrative style, for his command of irony, and for his remarkable gift for accompanying dialogue with an acute psychological commentary on the contextual motivation for what is said. The quintet is unashamedly nostalgic for an era of Oxford manners that was in the 1970s waning if not already gone, and this has put some readers off (whilst probably attracting others). He reproduces authentic views held by the community he evokes about society, sex, politics, race and education that are by no means widely held nowadays. Few readers will now acquiesce in many of the assumptions made or implied in these areas by the characters or even the narrator. Stewart narrates a world in which privilege and snobbery are normal; he critiques this, but he does not transcend it. In the story about Ivo Mumford's parachuting out of a rape charge a modern reader will surely regret any meaningful reflection on the situation of the victim. The sense that "boys will be boys" abounds in these novels, and there is a simplistic acceptance (on a narrative level) of the normality of class distinction and the way this impacts upon educational opportunity and success. Nevertheless, there is much sensitivity shown towards students who encounter problems. The novels are valuable above all for their insight into the social and intellectual dynamics of academic communities. In this respect Stewart is much more insightful than C. P. Snow, some of whose "Strangers and Brothers" novels from a previous era focus on similar bodies of people, and he is no less successful in plot-construction than his Cambridge counterpart.
