= List of poems by Philip Larkin =

The list of poems by Philip Larkin come mostly from the four volumes of poetry published during his lifetime:

- The North Ship (July 1945)
- The Less Deceived (November 1955, dated October)
- The Whitsun Weddings (February 1964)
- High Windows (June 1974)

Philip Larkin (1922–1985) also published other poems. They, along with the contents of the four published collections, are included in the 2003 edition of his Collected Poems in two appendices. The previous 1988 edition contains everything that appears in the 2003 edition and additionally includes all the known mature poems that he did not publish during his lifetime, plus an appendix of early work. To help differentiate between these published and unpublished poems in our table all poems that appear in the 2003 edition's appendices are listed as Collected Poems 2003; of course, they also appear in the 1988 volume.

Since 1988 many other unpublished, and as yet uncollected, poems have come to light. Some of these poems have now been included in "The Complete Poems by Philip Larkin," edited by Archie Burnett.

== List of poems ==
The following is the list of 244 poems attributed to Philip Larkin. Untitled poems are identified by their first lines and marked with an ellipsis. Completion dates are in the YYYY-MM-DD format, and are tagged "(best known date)" if the date is not definitive.

Poem title	Completion date	Book
Absences	1950-11-28	The Less Deceived
Administration	1965-03-03	Collected Poems 1988
After-Dinner Remarks	1940-06 (best known date)	Collected Poems 1988
Afternoons	1959-09 (best known date)	The Whitsun Weddings
Age	1954-05-26	The Less Deceived
All catches alight... (to Bruce Montgomery)	1944 (best known date)	The North Ship
Ambulances	1961-01-10	The Whitsun Weddings
An April Sunday brings the snow...	1948-04-04	Collected Poems 1988
An Arundel Tomb	1956-02-20	The Whitsun Weddings
And now the leaves suddenly lose strength...	1961-11-03	Collected Poems 1988
And the wave sings because it is moving...	1946-09-14	Collected Poems 1988
Annus Mirabilis	1967-06-16	High Windows
Ape Experiment Room	1965-02-24	Collected Poems 1988
Arrival	1950 (best known date)	Collected Poems 2003
Arrivals, Departures	1953-01-24	The Less Deceived
As a war in years of peace...	1940 (best known date)	Collected Poems 1988
As Bad as a Mile	1960-02-09	The Whitsun Weddings
At Grass	1950-01-03	The Less Deceived
At the chiming of light upon sleep...	1946-10-04	Collected Poems 1988
At thirty-one, when some are rich... (unfinished)	1953-08 (best known date)	Collected Poems 1988
Aubade	1977-11-29	Collected Poems 1988
Autobiography at an Air-Station	1953-12-06	Collected Poems 1988
Autumn	1953-10 (best known date)	Collected Poems 1988
Autumn has caught us in our summer wear...	1939 (best known date)	Collected Poems 1988
Best Society	1951 (best known date)	Collected Poems 1988
Born Yesterday (for Sally Amis)	1954-01-20	The Less Deceived
The bottle is drunk out by one...	1944 (best known date)	The North Ship
Breadfruit	1961-11-19	Collected Poems 2003
Bridge for the Living	1975–12 (best known date)	Collected Poems 2003
Broadcast	1961-11-06	The Whitsun Weddings
The Building	1972-02-09	High Windows
By day, a lifted study-storehouse...	1983-10 (best known date)	Collected Poems 1988
The Card-Players	1970-05-06	High Windows
Church Going	1954-07-28	The Less Deceived
Climbing the hill within the deafening wind...	1944-10-23	The North Ship
Come then to prayers...	1946-05-13	Collected Poems 1988
Coming	1950-02-25	The Less Deceived
Coming at last to night's most thankful springs...	1945-03-01	Collected Poems 1988
Compline	1950-02-12	Collected Poems 1988
Conscript (for James Ballard Sutton)	1941-10 (best known date)	The North Ship
Continuing to Live	1954-04-24	Collected Poems 2003
Counting	1955–09 (best known date)	Collected Poems 1988
Cut Grass	1971-06-03	High Windows
The daily things we do...	1979-02 (best known date)	Collected Poems 1988
The Dance (unfinished)	1964-05-12	Collected Poems 1988
The Dancer	1944 (best known date)	The North Ship
Dawn	1944 (best known date)	The North Ship
Days	1953-08-03	The Whitsun Weddings
Dear Charles, My Muse, asleep or dead...	1982 (best known date)	Collected Poems 2003
Deceptions	1950-02-20	The Less Deceived
The Dedicated	1946-09-18	Collected Poems 2003
Deep Analysis	1946-04 (best known date)	Collected Poems 1988
Disintegration	1942-02 (best known date)	Collected Poems 2003
Dockery and Son	1963-03-28	The Whitsun Weddings
Dry–Point	1950-03-17	The Less Deceived
Dublinesque	1970-06-06	High Windows
Essential Beauty	1962-06-26	The Whitsun Weddings
The Explosion	1970-01-05	High Windows
Faith Healing	1960-05-10	The Whitsun Weddings
Far Out	1959-02-01	Collected Poems 1988
Femmes Damnées	1943 (best known date)	Collected Poems 2003
Fiction and the Reading Public	1950-02-25	Collected Poems 2003
First Sight	1956-03-03	The Whitsun Weddings
For Sidney Bechet	1954-01-15	The Whitsun Weddings
Forget What Did	1971-08-06	High Windows
Fragment from May	1938 (best known date)	Collected Poems 1988
Friday Night in the Royal Station Hotel	1966-05-20	High Windows
Gathering Wood	1954-03-25	Collected Poems 1988
Going	1946–02 (best known date)	The Less Deceived
Going, Going	1972-01-25	High Windows
Good for you, Gavin...	1981-11-26	Collected Poems 1988
Having grown up in shade of Church and State...	1939-06 (best known date)	Collected Poems 1988
He Hears that his Beloved has become Engaged (for C.G.B.)	1953-01-29	Collected Poems 1988
Heads in the Women's Ward	1972-03-06	Collected Poems 2003
Heaviest of flowers, the head...	1944 (best known date)	The North Ship
Here	1961-10-08	The Whitsun Weddings
High Windows	1967-02-12	High Windows
The hills in their recumbent postures...	1940-03 (best known date)	Collected Poems 1988
Homage to a Government	1969-01-10	High Windows
Home is so Sad	1958-12-31	The Whitsun Weddings
The horns of the morning...	1944 (best known date)	The North Ship
Hospital Visits	1953-12-04	Collected Poems 1988
The house on the edge of the serious wood...	1941-04 (best known date)	Collected Poems 1988
How	1970-04-10	Collected Poems 2003
How Distant	1965-11-24	High Windows
How to Sleep	1950-03-10	Collected Poems 1988
I am washed upon a rock...	1949-03-19	Collected Poems 1988
I dreamed of an out-thrust arm of land	1943 (best known date)	The North Ship
I have started to say...	1971-10 (best known date)	Collected Poems 1988
I put my mouth...	1944 (best known date)	The North Ship
I Remember, I Remember	1954-01-08	The Less Deceived
If grief could burn out...	1944-10-05	The North Ship
I see a girl dragged by the wrists...	1944 (best known date)	The North Ship
If hands could free you, heart...	1944 (best known date)	The North Ship
If, My Darling	1950-05-23	The Less Deceived
Ignorance	1955-09-11	The Whitsun Weddings
In times when nothing stood...	1978-03-02	Collected Poems 2003
The Importance of Elsewhere	1955-06-13	The Whitsun Weddings
Is it for now or for always...	1944 (best known date)	The North Ship
Kick up the fire, and let the flames break loose...	1944 (best known date)	The North Ship
The Large Cool Store	1961-06-18	The Whitsun Weddings
Last Will and Testament	1940-09 (best known date)	Collected Poems 1988
Latest Face	1951-02 (best known date)	The Less Deceived
Letter to a Friend about Girls	1959-12 (best known date)	Collected Poems 1988
The Life with a Hole in it	1974-08-08	Collected Poems 2003
Lift through the breaking day...	1945-08-27	Collected Poems 1988
Like the train's beat...	1944 (best known date)	The North Ship
Lines on a Young Lady's Photograph Album	1953-09-18	The Less Deceived
The Literary World	1950-03-20	Collected Poems 1988
The little lives of earth and form...	1977-05-06	Collected Poems 1988
Livings: I, II, III	1971-12-10	High Windows
Long Last	1963-02-03	Collected Poems 1988
Long lion days...	1982-07-21	Collected Poems 1988
Long roots moor summer to our side of earth...	1954-06-12	Collected Poems 1988
Long Sight in Age	1955-06-20	Collected Poems 1988
Love	1962-12-07	Collected Poems 2003
Love Again	1979-09-20	Collected Poems 1988
Love Songs in Age	1957-01-01	The Whitsun Weddings
Love, we must part now...	1944 (best known date)	The North Ship
MCMXIV	1960-05-17	The Whitsun Weddings
Maiden Name	1955-01-15	The Less Deceived
Many famous feet have trod...	1946-10-15	Collected Poems 1988
The March Past	1951-05-25	Collected Poems 1988
Marriages	1951-06-12	Collected Poems 1988
Maturity	1951 (best known date)	Collected Poems 1988
May Weather	1941-06-05	Collected Poems 2003
Midsummer Night, 1940	1940-06 (best known date)	Collected Poems 1988
Midwinter Waking	1954-01-27	Collected Poems 1988
Modesties	1949-05-13	Collected Poems 2003
Money	1973-02-19	High Windows
The moon is full tonight...	1944 (best known date)	The North Ship
Morning at last: there in the snow...	1976-02-01	Collected Poems 1988
Morning has spread again...	1944 (best known date)	The North Ship
Mother, Summer, I	1953-08 (best known date)	Collected Poems 1988
The Mower	1979-06-12	Collected Poems 2003
Mr Bleaney	1955-05 (best known date)	The Whitsun Weddings
Mythological Introduction	1943 (best known date)	Collected Poems 2003
Myxomatosis	1954 (best known date)	The Less Deceived
Naturally the Foundation will Bear Your Expenses	1961-02-22	The Whitsun Weddings
Negative Indicative (unfinished)	1953-12-28	Collected Poems 1988
Neurotics	1949-03 (best known date)	Collected Poems 1988
New eyes each year...	1979-02 (best known date)	Collected Poems 1988
New Year Poem	1940-12-31	Collected Poems 1988
Next, Please	1951-01-16	The Less Deceived
Night-Music	1944-10-12	The North Ship
No Road	1950-10-28	The Less Deceived
None of the books have time...	1960-01-01	Collected Poems 1988
The North Ship	1944-10-08	The North Ship
Nothing significant was really said...	1940-03 (best known date)	Collected Poems 1988
Nothing To Be Said	1961-10-18	The Whitsun Weddings
Nursery Tale	1944 (best known date)	The North Ship
Observation	1941-11-22	Collected Poems 2003
Oils	1950-03-14	Collected Poems 2003
The Old Fools	1973-01-12	High Windows
On Being Twenty-Six	1949-05 (best known date)	Collected Poems 1988
One man walking a deserted platform...	1944 (best known date)	The North Ship
Out in the lane I pause...	1940-12 (best known date)	Collected Poems 1988
Party Politics	1984-01 (best known date)	Collected Poems 2003
Past days of gales...	1945-11-17	Collected Poems 1988
Pigeons	1955-12-27	Collected Poems 2003
Places, Loved Ones	1954-10-10	The Less Deceived
Plymouth	1945-06-25	Collected Poems 2003
Poem about Oxford (for Monica)	1970 (best known date)	Collected Poems 1988
Poetry of Departures	1954-01-23	The Less Deceived
Portrait	1945-11-07	Collected Poems 2003
Posterity	1968-06-17	High Windows
Pour away that youth...	1944 (best known date)	The North Ship
Reasons for Attendance	1953-12-30	The Less Deceived
Reference Back	1955-08-21	The Whitsun Weddings
Sad Steps	1968-04-24	High Windows
The School in August	1943 (best known date)	Collected Poems 1988
Schoolmaster	1940 (best known date)	Collected Poems 1988
Scratch on the scratchpad...	1966-07-19	Collected Poems 1988
Self's the Man	1958-05-05	The Whitsun Weddings
Send No Money	1962-08-21	The Whitsun Weddings
Show Saturday	1973-12-03	High Windows
Since the majority of me...	1950-12-06	Collected Poems 2003
Sinking like sediment through the day...	1949-05-13	Collected Poems 1988
Skin	1954-04-05	The Less Deceived
A slight relax of air where cold was...	1962-01-13	Collected Poems 1988
So through that unripe day you bore your head...	1944 (best known date)	The North Ship
So you have been, despite parental ban...	1940-03 (best known date)	Collected Poems 1988
Solar	1964-11-04	High Windows
The Spirit Wooed	1950 (best known date)	Collected Poems 1988
Spring	1950-05-19	The Less Deceived
Spring Warning	1940–04 (best known date)	Collected Poems 1988
A Stone Church Damaged by a Bomb	1943-06 (best known date)	Collected Poems 2003
Story	1941-02-13	Collected Poems 2003
Strangers	1950-05-20	Collected Poems 1988
Street Lamps	1939-09 (best known date)	Collected Poems 1988
A Study of Reading Habits	1960-08-20	The Whitsun Weddings
Success Story	1954-03-11	Collected Poems 2003
Summer Nocturne	1939 (best known date)	Collected Poems 1988
Sunny Prestatyn	1962-10 (best known date)	The Whitsun Weddings
Sympathy in White Major	1967-08-31	High Windows
Take One Home for the Kiddies	1960-08-13	The Whitsun Weddings
Talking in Bed	1960-08-10	The Whitsun Weddings
Thaw	1946-12 (best known date)	Collected Poems 1988
The local snivels through the fields...	1951 (best known date)	Collected Poems 1988
There is no language of destruction...	1940 (best known date)	Collected Poems 1988
This Be The Verse	1971-04 (best known date)	High Windows
This is the first thing...	1944 (best known date)	The North Ship
This was your place of birth, this daytime palace...	1942-02-28	The North Ship
Time and Space were only their disguises...	1941-04 (best known date)	Collected Poems 1988
To a Very Slow Air	1946-09-29	Collected Poems 1988
To Failure	1949-05-18	Collected Poems 1988
To My Wife	1951-03-19	Collected Poems 1988
To put one brick upon another...	1951 (best known date)	Collected Poems 1988
To the Sea	1969-10 (best known date)	High Windows
To write one song, I said...	1944 (best known date)	The North Ship
Toads	1954-03-16	The Less Deceived
Toads Revisited	1962-10 (best known date)	The Whitsun Weddings
Tops	1953-10-24	Collected Poems 2003
Träumerei	1946-09-27	Collected Poems 1988
The Trees	1967-06-02	High Windows
Triple Time	1953-10-03	The Less Deceived
Two Guitar Pieces	1946-09-18	Collected Poems 1988
Ugly Sister	1944 (best known date)	The North Ship
Under a splendid chestnut tree...	1950-06 (best known date)	Collected Poems 1988
Ultimatum	1940-06 (best known date)	Collected Poems 2003
Unfinished Poem	1951 (best known date)	Collected Poems 1988
Vers de Société	1971-05-19	High Windows
The View	1972-08 (best known date)	Collected Poems 1988
Waiting for breakfast, while she brushed her hair...	1947-12-15	The North Ship
Wants	1950-06-01	The Less Deceived
Water	1954-04-06	The Whitsun Weddings
We met at the end of the party...	1976-02 (best known date)	Uncollected
We see the spring breaking across rough stone...	1939 (best known date)	Collected Poems 1988
Wedding-Wind	1946-09-26	The Less Deceived
Whatever Happened	1953-10-26	The Less Deceived
Who whistled for the wind, that it should break...	1945-12-15	Collected Poems 1988
Why did I dream of you last night?...	1939 (best known date)	Collected Poems 1988
When first we touched, and touching showed...	1975-12-20	Collected Poems 1988
When the night puts twenty veils...	1939-09 (best known date)	Collected Poems 1988
When the Russian tanks roll westward...	1969-03 (best known date)	Collected Poems 2003
The Whitsun Weddings	1958-10-18	The Whitsun Weddings
Who called love conquering...	1950-07-17	Collected Poems 2003
Wild Oats	1962-05-12	The Whitsun Weddings
Winter	1944 (best known date)	The North Ship
Winter Nocturne	1938 (best known date)	Collected Poems 1988
The Winter Palace	1978-11-01	Collected Poems 1988
Within the dream you said...	1944-10-12	The North Ship
Wires	1950-11-04	The Less Deceived
A Writer	1941-05-08	Collected Poems 2003

== Footnotes ==
1. "Dry-point" written as second part of "Two Portraits about Sex"
2. "Oils" written as first part of "Two Portraits about Sex"
3. "Waiting for breakfast while she brushed her hair..." only published in the 1966 Faber and Faber reissue
4. "We met at the end of the party..." only published in issue 14 of The Larkin Society's journal About Larkin
