= Alison Pill =

Canadian actress (born 1985)

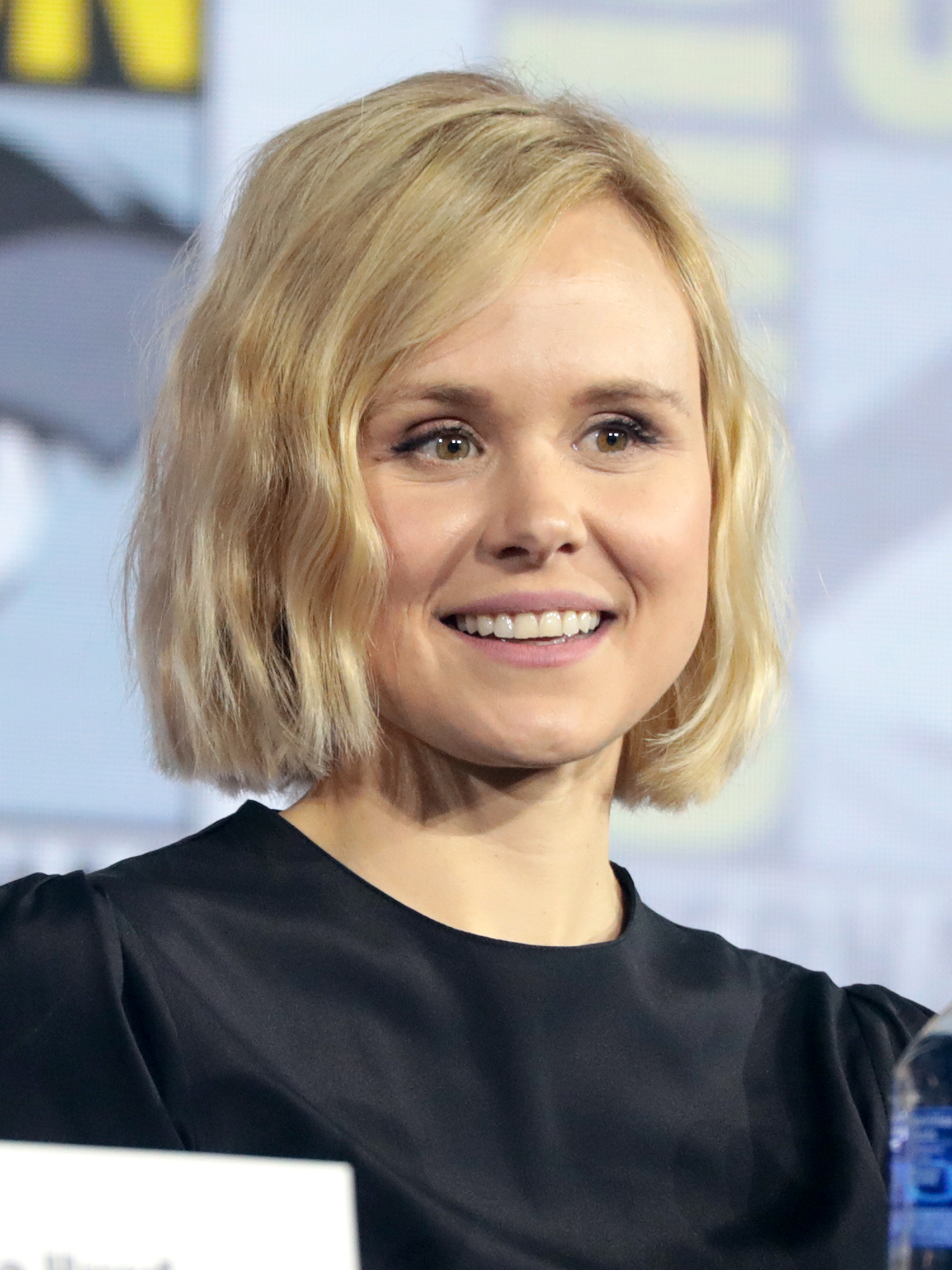
- Pill speaking at the 2019 San Diego Comicon in San Diego
- Born: November 27, 1985 (age 40); Toronto, Ontario, Canada
- Education: Vaughan Road Academy
- Occupation: Actress
- Years active: 1995–present
- Spouse: Joshua Leonard (m. 2015; div. 2025)
- Children: 1

Alison Pill (born November 27, 1985) is a Canadian actress. A former child actress, she began her career at age 12, appearing in numerous projects before transitioning to adult roles with a breakthrough role in the television series The Book of Daniel (2006), a tv series on NBC. Also in 2006, she made her Broadway debut in The Lieutenant of Inishmore (2006) earning a nomination for Tony Award for Best Featured Actress in a Play. Pill's other notable stage roles include being in Blackbird (2007), Mauritius (2007), The Miracle Worker (2010), The House of Blue Leaves (2011), and Three Tall Women (2018).

Pill had prominent roles in the films Confessions of a Teenage Drama Queen (2004), Plain Truth (2004), Dan in Real Life (2007), Milk (2008), Midnight in Paris (2011), Hail, Caesar! (2016), and Vice (2018). From 2012 to 2014 she played Maggie Jordan in Aaron Sorkin's HBO drama series The Newsroom and acted in the television series In Treatment (2009), The Pillars of the Earth (2010), American Horror Story: Cult (2017), Star Trek: Picard (2020–2022), Devs (2020), and Them (2021). She is also known for her role as Kim Pine in the film Scott Pilgrim vs. the World (2010) and the Netflix animated series Scott Pilgrim Takes Off (2023).

== Background ==
Pill was born in Toronto. Her father, a professional engineer, is Estonian. She attended Vaughan Road Academy in the city. She was in its Interact program which featured dance, music, athletics, and theatre.

== Career ==
=== 1997–2007: Rise to prominence ===
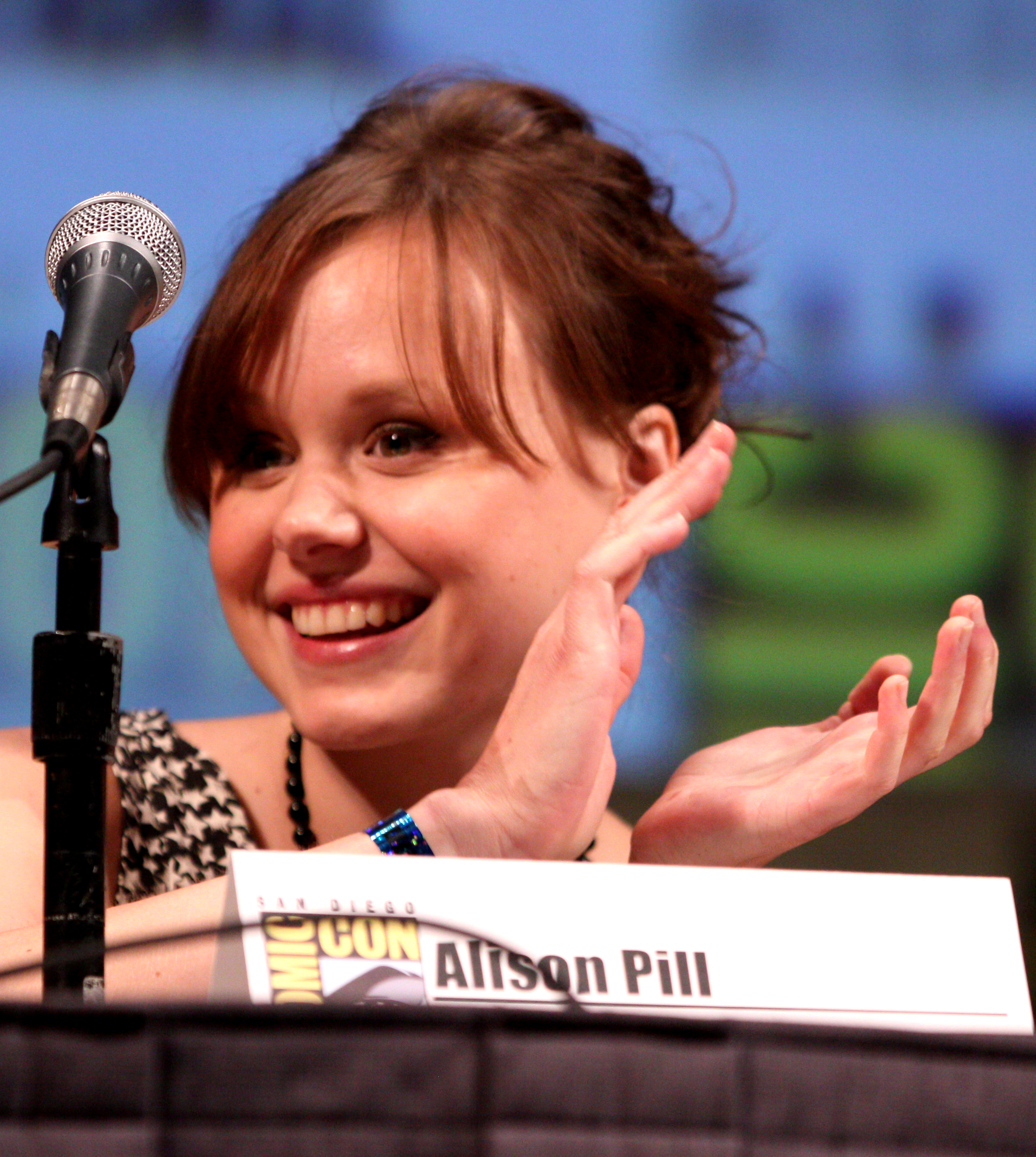
Pill at the 2010 San Diego Comic Con

Pill decided to become an actor when she was 10 years old. As a member of the Toronto Children's Chorus, she was chosen to narrate one of their performances. Her mother tried to discourage Pill by getting her a job as a background performer on the series Kung Fu: The Legend Continues. By the time she was 11, she had played a guest role on an episode of the children's series The New Ghostwriter Mysteries. At 12, she landed roles in two TV movies and a mini-series, a guest appearance on the TV series Psi Factor and voiced the character "Cornflower" on the animated series Redwall (1999–2001). After roles in two more television movies, she landed her first feature film role, a small-budget Canadian movie called The Life Before This in 1999, followed by the role of Jacob's older sister Marfa in Jacob Two Two Meets the Hooded Fang, another Canadian movie. Pill played roles in four more TV movies before the age of fourteen. She landed a small role in Skipped Parts in 2000 starring Drew Barrymore and Mischa Barton, then appeared in four more TV movies and features that year, including playing Farrah Fawcett's daughter in the TNT movie Baby and a lead role in the Canadian film The Dinosaur Hunter, which was originally intended to be shown at a dinosaur museum and on a provincial education channel, but which made its way to the Burbank International Film Festival, winning Pill an award for Best Child Actress.

She landed the role of young Lorna in the ABC-TV biopic Life with Judy Garland: Me and My Shadows in 2001, based on the memoir by Garland's daughter, Lorna Luft. Also in 2001, Pill also played Sissy Spacek's daughter in the TV flick Midwives. In 2003, she played Katie Holmes' sister in the indie feature Pieces of April. Pill won the lead in the CTV-TV movie Fast Food High, about a teenager who gets a job at a fast food restaurant and tries to set up a union. She also landed a supporting role in Confessions of a Teenage Drama Queen in 2003, starring Lindsay Lohan. Pill ventured into stage acting, with the Manhattan, New York staging of None of the Above as the first item in her theatre credentials. In 2006, she starred as Grace Webster in the short-lived NBC drama The Book of Daniel. That same year, she made her Broadway debut playing Mairead in Martin McDonagh's black comedy play The Lieutenant of Inishmore for which she was nominated for the Tony Award for Best Featured Actress in a Play.

Because of her busy work schedule, Pill's schooling was through a program for children in the entertainment industry. Since graduating from high school, she moved to New York to pursue a career in theatre, but continued to work in movies such as Dan in Real Life in 2007. She returned to Broadway in the Theresa Rebeck play Mauritius (2007) acting alongside F. Murray Abraham, Bobby Cannavale, and Dylan Baker. John Lahr of The New Yorker commended Pill as "excellent" adding, "It says something about the appeal of Alison Pill—an actress with a big future—that her compelling combination of ferocity and fragility carries the audience beyond the inconsistencies of the story." In 2007, she acted in the Manhattan Theatre Club production of the David Harrower play Blackbird starring alongside Jeff Daniels. The production was directed by Joe Mantello and was helmed at Center's Stage I in Manhattan, New York. For her performance she received the Drama League Award, Lucille Lortel Award, and Outer Critics Circle Awards nominations. That was followed by The Distance From Here, On the Mountain.

=== 2008–2014: Film roles and The Newsroom ===
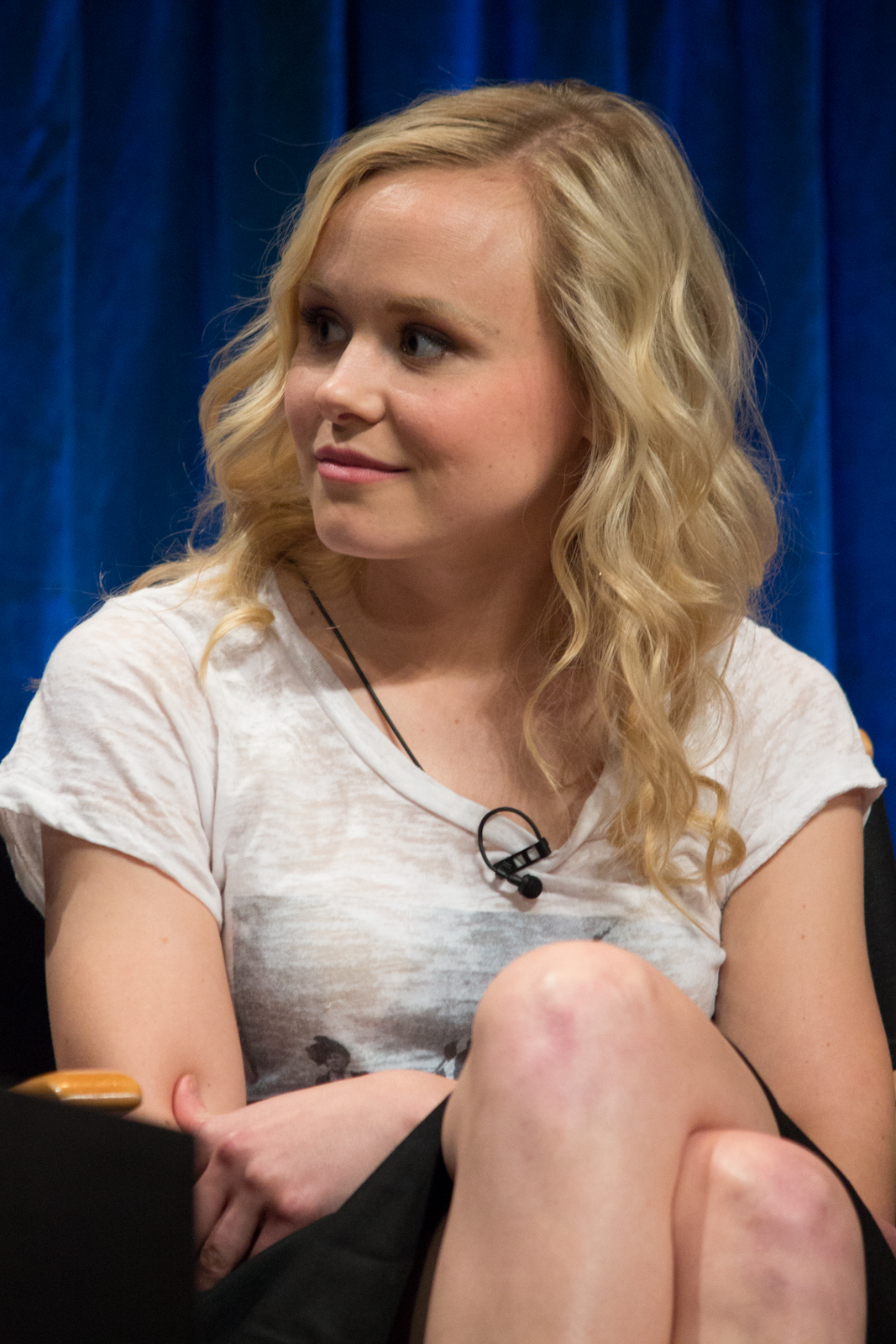
Pill at the 2013 PaleyFest in Midtown Manhattan, New York

Pill had a major supporting role as campaign manager Anne Kronenberg in the 2008 film Milk. In 2009, she performed with Erin Hill & her Psychedelic Harp playing the Twilight Zone-inspired "Meredith Moon" and "The Real North Pole" sci-fi Christmas Harp. Pill was cast as April on In Treatment. In 2009 she replaced Elliot Page in a role in Jack & Diane but due to postponement of the project neither ended up in it by the time it ran in 2012. Pill later played Kim Pine in the movie Scott Pilgrim vs. the World (2010) as well as in the short, Scott Pilgrim vs. the Animation. She portrayed Empress Maud in the miniseries The Pillars of the Earth.

Pill starred with Abigail Breslin in the Broadway revival of the William Gibson play The Miracle Worker (2010), David Rooney of Variety wrote, "Pill has demonstrated her skill at animating prickly contemporary women who can go from sullen vulnerability into bellicose attack mode in a flash. She's no less convincing as 20-year-old Boston Irish Sullivan, hired in 1887 by the Keller family in Alabama to serve as governess to Helen, left deaf and blind by an illness in her infancy". In 2011, she acted in another Broadway revival, the John Guare play The House of Blue Leaves with Ben Stiller, Edie Falco, Jennifer Jason Leigh, and Thomas Sadoski. In the play she portrayed a kindly, partially deaf actress. She received positive reviews with Entertainment Weekly describing her as "delightfully daffy", and The Hollywood Reporter declaring, "Pill's funny-sad ethereal performance exposes the cultivated poise and glamour of Hollywood as another empty fantasy". She appeared in Woody Allen's acclaimed romantic comedy Midnight in Paris (2011) portraying Zelda Fitzgerald alongside Tom Hiddleston as F. Scott Fitzgerald. In 2012, she reunited with Allen portraying Hayley in To Rome with Love (2012). She starred in short films including Denise in 2012 with Chris Messina and Santa Baby; she also sang and danced in Santa Baby. In 2016, she appeared in Cover Up by Satya Bhabha with Jason Ritter, to be released at the LA Shorts Fest, and Woman in Deep, playing a woman who calls a suicide prevention hot line and is put on hold, directed by Janicza Bravo.

From 2012 until it ended in 2014, she was in The Newsroom, a political drama series on HBO portraying journalist Maggie Jordan at a fictional cable news show. In a Geffen Playhouse production of Wait Until Dark (2013), she starred as a blind woman who fends for her life. Myron Meisel of The Hollywood Reporter compared Pill's performance favourably to previous actors who played the role including Lee Remick and Audrey Hepburn, writing "the reliably talented Pill instills [the role] with a distinctive individuality." Pill starred in Bong Joon-ho's post-apocalyptic film Snowpiercer, alongside Chris Evans and Tilda Swinton, which came out in 2013. Pill appeared in Cooties (2014) starring Elijah Wood. In Zoom, she played Emma, an aspiring comic book artist.

=== 2015–present ===
She acted in the Coen Brothers comedy Hail, Caesar! (2015) playing Eddie Mannix's wife. Pill starred in Goon: Last of the Enforcers as Eva Glatt, Doug Glatt's love interest in first movie Goon, and now married to her. She was part of the cast of The Family as Willa Warren. In 2016, Pill co-starred with Jessica Chastain in the EuropaCorp thriller Miss Sloane. In 2017, she joined American Horror Story: Cult, starring as Ivy Mayfair-Richards, one of the main characters of the storyline. In 2018 she played former Vice President Dick Cheney's daughter Mary in the Oscar-nominated film Vice. Also in 2018, she acted in the Broadway revival of the Edward Albee's Three Tall Women, a memory play, acting alongside Glenda Jackson and Laurie Metcalf.

In 2020, she was part of the TV series Devs directed by Alex Garland on FX on Hulu and played Katie, the chief designer of the Devs system. In 2021, she starred in the film All My Puny Sorrows with Sarah Gadon, as two Mennonite sisters who leave their religious lives behind. Pill won Best Actress in a Canadian Film by Vancouver Film Critics Circle for her role in the movie. She was in the TV series Them, playing Betty Wendell. For the first two seasons of Star Trek: Picard, she played scientist Dr. Agnes Jurati. Pill returned to Broadway playing Sonya in the 2024 revival of the Anton Chekov play Uncle Vanya starring with Steve Carell, William Jackson Harper, Jayne Houdyshell, and Alfred Molina at Lincoln Center in Manhattan. David Cote of The Observer hailed her performance, "Pill proves to be the evening's MVP... [She] embodies that brokenness with a palpable heat I wish could have ignited everything around her".

== Personal life ==
Pill was engaged to actor Jay Baruchel from 2011 to 2013.

Pill and actor Joshua Leonard married on May 24, 2015, They have a daughter who was born in 2016. On August 15, 2025, Leonard announced their divorce via social media.

== Acting credits ==
=== Film ===
Year	Title	Role	Notes
1999	The Life Before This	Jessica	
1999	Jacob Two Two Meets the Hooded Fang	Shapiro / Emma	
2000	Skipped Parts	Chuckette Morris	
2002	A.W.O.L.	Patient	Short film
2002	Perfect Pie	Marie Beck (age 15)	
2003	Pieces of April	Beth Burns	
2003	Fast Food High	Emma Redding	
2004	Confessions of a Teenage Drama Queen	Ella Gerard	
2004	The Crypt Club	Liesl	Short film
2005	Dear Wendy	Susan	
2007	Dan in Real Life	Jane Burns	
2007	Working in the Theatre	Self	Documentary
2008	Milk	Anne Kronenberg	
2009	The Awakening of Abigail Harris	Abigail Harris	Short film
2009	One Way to Valhalla	Dale	
2010	Goldstar, Ohio	Kendra Harper	Short film
2010	EMGOD	Alison	Short film
2010	Scott Pilgrim vs. the Animation	Kimberly "Kim" Pine (voice)	Short film
2010	Scott Pilgrim vs. the World	Kimberly "Kim" Pine	
2011	Midnight in Paris	Zelda Fitzgerald	
2011	Portraits in Dramatic Time	Self	
2011	Goon	Eva	
2012	To Rome with Love	Hayley	
2012	Denise	Denise	Short film
2012	Santa Baby	Alice	Short film
2013	Snowpiercer	Pregnant Teacher	
2014	Cooties	Lucy McCormick	
2015	Zoom	Emma Boyles	
2016	Hail, Caesar!	Mrs. Mannix	
2016	Woman in Deep	Birdie	Short film
2016	Cover Up	Emma	Short film
2016	Miss Sloane	Jane Molloy	
2017	Goon: Last of the Enforcers	Eva Glatt	
2018	Ideal Home	Melissa Enright	
2018	Vice	Mary Cheney	
2019	The Most Magnificent Thing	Mom (voice)	Short film
2020	We Are Animals	Self	Documentary
2021	The Same Storm	Bridget Salt	
2022	All My Puny Sorrows	Yolandi "Yoli" Von Riesen	
2023	Eric Larue	Lisa Graff	
2024	Trap	Rachel Abbott	
2024	Young Werther	Charlotte	
TBA	Dedicated to Morris Burke †		Filming

=== Television ===
Year	Title	Role	Notes
1997	The New Ghostwriter Mysteries	Lucy	Episode: "Moving Parts"
1998	Fast Track	Alexa Stokes	Episode: "Real Time"
1998	Psi Factor: Chronicles of the Paranormal	Sophie Schulman	Episode: "The Night of the Setting Sun"
1998	The Last Don II	Bethany	Episode: "1.1"
1998	Anatole	Paulette (voice)	5 episodes
1998	Degas & the Dancer	Marie van Goethem	Television film
1998	Stranger in Town	Hetty	Television film
1999	Locked in Silence	Lacey	Television film
1999	God's New Plan	Samantha Hutton	Television film
1999	Different	Sally Reed	Television film
1999	What Katy Did	Katy Carr	Television film
1999	Dear America: A Journey to the New World	Remember Patience Whipple	Television film
1999	A Holiday Romance	Fern	Television film
1999	Redwall	Cornflower (voice)	13 episodes
1999	Poltergeist: The Legacy	Paige	Episode: "Forget Me Not"
2000	Traders	Andrea Exter	Episode: "Hawks"
2000	Redwall: The Movie	Cornflower (voice)	Television film
2000	The Dinosaur Hunter	Julia Creath	Television film
2000	The Other Me	Allana Browning	Television film
2000	Baby	Larkin Malone	Television film
2001	Life with Judy Garland: Me and My Shadows	Young Lorna Luft	Television film
2001	Midwives	Constance "Connie" Danforth	Television film
2001	What Girls Learn	Tilden	Television film
2001	Anne of Green Gables: The Animated Series	Victoria (voice)	Episode: "Butterflies!"
2002	The Pilot's Wife	Mattie Lyons	Television film
2002	An Unexpected Love	Samantha Mayer	Television film
2004	A Separate Peace	Beth	Television film
2004	Plain Truth	Katie Fisher	Television film
2006	The Book of Daniel	Grace Webster	8 episodes
2006	Law & Order: Criminal Intent	Lisa Ramsey	Episode: "Wrongful Life"
2008	CSI: Crime Scene Investigation	Kelsey Murphy	Episode: "Woulda, Coulda, Shoulda"
2009	In Treatment	April	Recurring role, 7 episodes
2010	The Pillars of the Earth	Princess Maude	Miniseries, 8 episodes
2012–14	The Newsroom	Margaret "Maggie" Jordan	Main role, 25 episodes
2014	7p/10e	Alison	Episode: "Day 16"
2014	Therapy	Lucy	Episode: "1.1"
2014	Dinner with Friends with Brett Gelman and Friends	Herself	Television short
2016	The Family	Willa Warren	12 episodes
2017	American Horror Story: Cult	Ivy Mayfair-Richards	Main role, 9 episodes
2018	The Emperor's Newest Clothes	Thomasina (voice)	Television short
2020–22	Star Trek: Picard	Dr. Agnes Jurati	Main role, 20 episodes
2020	Devs	Katie	Miniseries, 8 episodes
2021	Them	Elizabeth "Betty" Wendell	8 episodes
2022	Archer	Alessia (voice)	3 episodes
2023	Hello Tomorrow!	Myrtle Mayburn	10 episodes
2023	Scott Pilgrim Takes Off	Kimberly "Kim" Pine (voice)	Main role
2025	RoboGobo	Farmer Faye (voice)	
2026	The Murder of JonBenét Ramsey	Linda Arndt	
2026	Rabbit, Rabbit		
2026	Get Jiro	Rose (voice)	

=== Theatre ===
Year	Title	Role	Playwright	Venue	Notes	Ref.
2003	None of the Above	Jamie	Jenny Lyn Bader	Ohio Theatre	Off-off-Broadway	
2004	The Distance from Here	Jenn	Neil LaBute	MCC Theater	Off-Broadway	
2005	On the Mountain	Jaime	Christopher Shinn	Playwrights Horizons	Off-Broadway	
2006	The Lieutenant of Inishmore	Mairead	Martin McDonagh	Lyceum Theatre	Broadway	
2007	Blackbird	Una	David Harrower	Manhattan Theatre Club	Off-Broadway	
2007	Mauritius	Jackie	Theresa Rebeck	Samuel J. Friedman Theatre	Broadway	
2008	Reasons to Be Pretty	Steph	Neil LaBute	Lucille Lortel Theatre	Off-Broadway	
2010	The Miracle Worker	Anne Sullivan	William Gibson	Circle in the Square Theatre	Broadway	
2010	This Wide Night	Marie	Chloe Moss	Peter Jay Sharp Theatre	Off-Broadway	
2011	The House of Blue Leaves	Corrinna Stroller	John Guare	Walter Kerr Theatre	Broadway	
2013	Wait Until Dark	Susan	Frederick Knott	Geffen Playhouse	Los Angeles	
2018	Three Tall Women	C	Edward Albee	John Golden Theatre	Broadway	
2024	Uncle Vanya	Sonya	Anton Chekov	Vivian Beaumont Theatre	Broadway	
2027	Too Bad For Her	Justine	Clare Barron	Atlantic Theater Company	Off-Broadway	

=== Music videos ===
Year	Title	Artist(s)
2004	"Drama Queen (That Girl)"	Lindsay Lohan
2010	"Lewis Takes Off His Shirt"	Owen Pallett
2010	"Medicine"	Nick Casey
2020	"Eat It (We're All In This Together)"	David Cross featuring "Weird Al" Yankovic

=== Web ===
Year	Title	Role	Website
2016	Honest Phone Sex for Married Couples	Wife	Funny or Die
2016	Angel and Demon	Demon	WeatherFrom
2018	George's Cheese/Pizza Revenge	Mother Porpoise	Story Pirates
2020	Fight of the Century	Narrator	Simon & Schuster
2020	Skin Trade	Nick	Geffen Playhouse
2020	The Homebound Project	C.A. Johnson	The Homebound Theater
2020	The Line	Jennifer	The Public Theater
2020	Scott Pilgrim vs. the World Water Crisis	Kim Pine / Vegan Police	Water For People
2020	My Mouth Ran Away	Mother Porpoise	Story Pirates
2020	Raising Arizona	Edwina "Ed"	Pandemic Players
2022	The Doctor Is In	Dr. Kate Spencer (voice)	Echoverse
2022	The Rubber Room	Lindsey Whittle	SiriusXM

== Discography ==
=== With Sex Bob-omb ===
Soundtrack

Title	Year	Album
"We Are Sex Bob-Omb"	2010	Scott Pilgrim vs. the World: Original Motion Picture Soundtrack
"Garbage Truck"	2010	Scott Pilgrim vs. the World: Original Motion Picture Soundtrack
"Threshold"	2010	Scott Pilgrim vs. the World: Original Motion Picture Soundtrack
"Summertime"	2010	Scott Pilgrim vs. the World: Original Motion Picture Soundtrack
"Indefatigable"	2010	Scott Pilgrim vs. the World: Original Motion Picture Soundtrack

== Awards and nominations ==
Year	Award	Category	Work	Result	Ref.
2000	Burbank International Children's Film Festival	Best Child Actress Performance	The Dinosaur Hunter	Won	
2000	Young Artist Award	Best Performance in a TV Movie or Pilot – Supporting Young Actress	Degas and the Dancer	Nominated	
2001	Young Artist Award	Best Ensemble in a TV Movie	The Other Me	Nominated	
2002	Young Artist Award	Best Performance in a TV Movie or Special – Leading Young Actress	What Girls Learn	Nominated	
2003	Gemini Awards	Best Performance in a Children's or Youth Program or Series	The Dinosaur Hunter	Nominated	
2004	Drama Desk Award	Outstanding Ensemble Performance	The Distance From Here	Won	
2005	Lucille Lortel Awards	Outstanding Featured Actress	On the Mountain	Nominated	
2006	Tony Award	Best Featured Actress in a Play	The Lieutenant of Inishmore	Nominated	
2007	Outer Critics Circle Award	Outstanding Actress in a Play	Blackbird	Nominated	
2007	Drama League Award	Distinguished Performance	Blackbird	Nominated	
2008	Lucille Lortel Award	Outstanding Lead Actress	Blackbird	Nominated	
2009	Screen Actors Guild Award	Outstanding Performance by a Cast in a Motion Picture	Milk	Nominated	
2009	Gold Derby Awards	Ensemble Cast	Milk	Nominated	
2009	Critics' Choice Awards	Best Acting Ensemble	Milk	Won	
2009	Online Film & Television Association Award	Best Supporting Actress in a Drama Series	In Treatment	Nominated	
2010	Detroit Film Critics Society Awards	Best Ensemble	Scott Pilgrim vs. the World	Nominated	
2011	Drama League Award	Distinguished Performance	This Wide Night	Nominated	
2011	Gemini Awards	Best Performance by an Actor in a Featured Supporting Role in a Dramatic Program or Mini-Series	The Pillars of the Earth	Nominated	
2011	Phoenix Film Critics Society Awards	Best Ensemble Acting	Midnight in Paris	Nominated	
2011	Screen Actors Guild Awards	Outstanding Performance by a Cast in a Motion Picture	Midnight in Paris	Nominated	
2012	Gold Derby Awards	Ensemble Cast	Midnight in Paris	Nominated	
2013	Vancouver Film Critics Circle Award	Best Supporting Actress in a Canadian Film	Goon	Nominated	
2014	San Diego International Film Festival	Virtuoso Award for Best Breakthrough Performance	The Newsroom	Awarded	
2018	Critics' Choice Movie Awards	Best Acting Ensemble	Vice	Nominated	
2018	Detroit Film Critics Society	Best Ensemble	Vice	Won	
2018	Seattle Film Critics Society	Best Ensemble Cast	Vice	Nominated	
2022	Vancouver Film Critics Circle Award	Best Actress in a Canadian Film	All My Puny Sorrows	Won	
2022	Festival du Film Canadien de Dieppe	Best Actress	All My Puny Sorrows	Won	
2022	Tell-Tale TV Awards	Favorite Performer in a Network Sci-fi / Fantasy / Horror Series	Star Trek: Picard	Nominated	
2022	Tell-Tale TV Awards	Favorite Ensemble Cast in a Sci-fi/Fantasy/Horror Series	Star Trek: Picard	Nominated	
2024	Vancouver Film Critics Circle Award	Best Supporting Actress in a Canadian Film	Young Werther	Nominated	
