= An Arundel Tomb =

1956 English poem

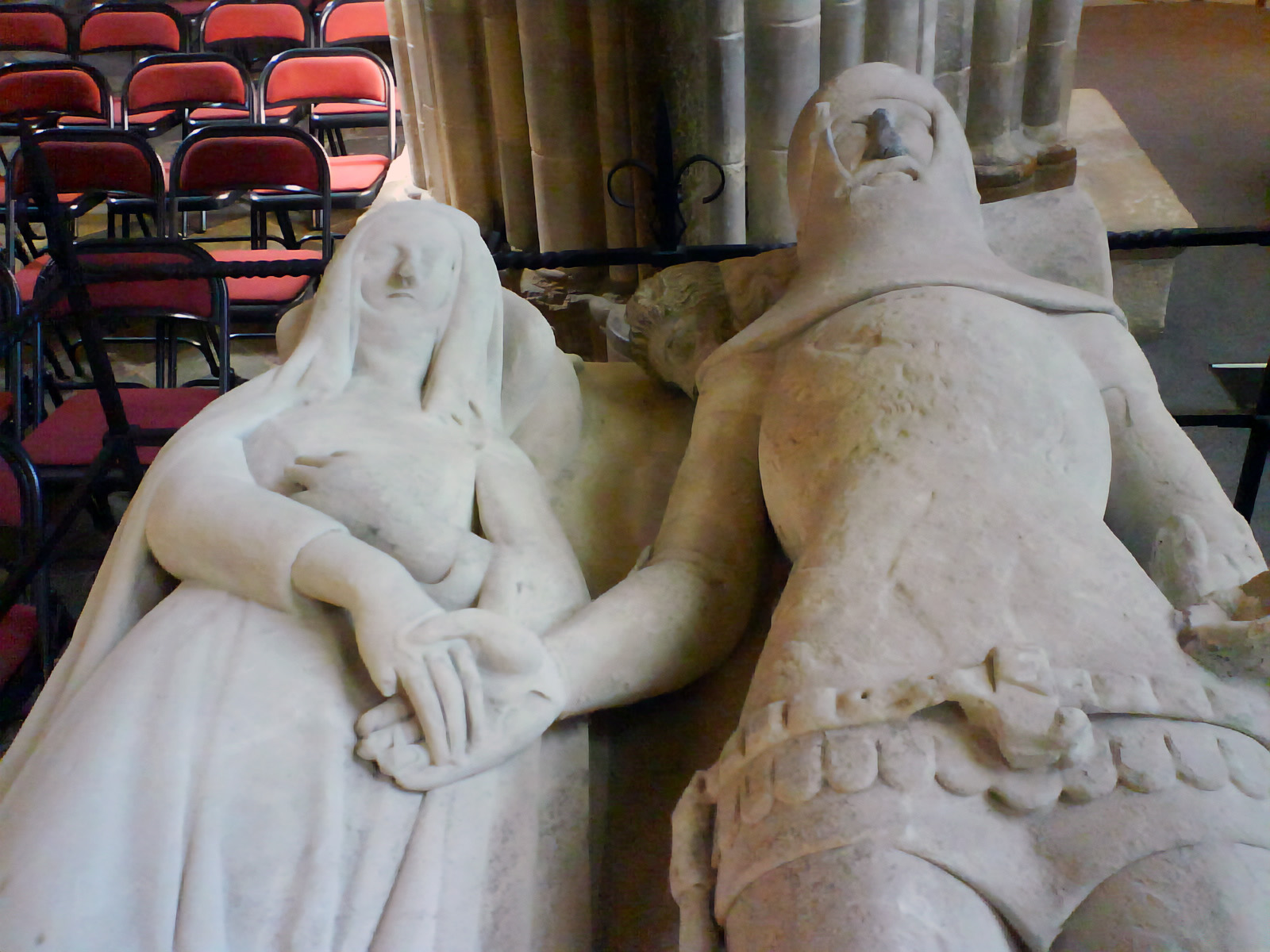
The monument in Chichester Cathedral

"An Arundel Tomb" is a poem by Philip Larkin, written and published in 1956, and subsequently included in his 1964 collection The Whitsun Weddings. He composed it after seeing a pair of recumbent Tomb effigies with hands joined in Chichester Cathedral. The words were described by James Booth as "one of [Larkin's] greatest poems". It consists of seven verses of six lines, each with rhyme scheme ABBCAC.

== The monument ==
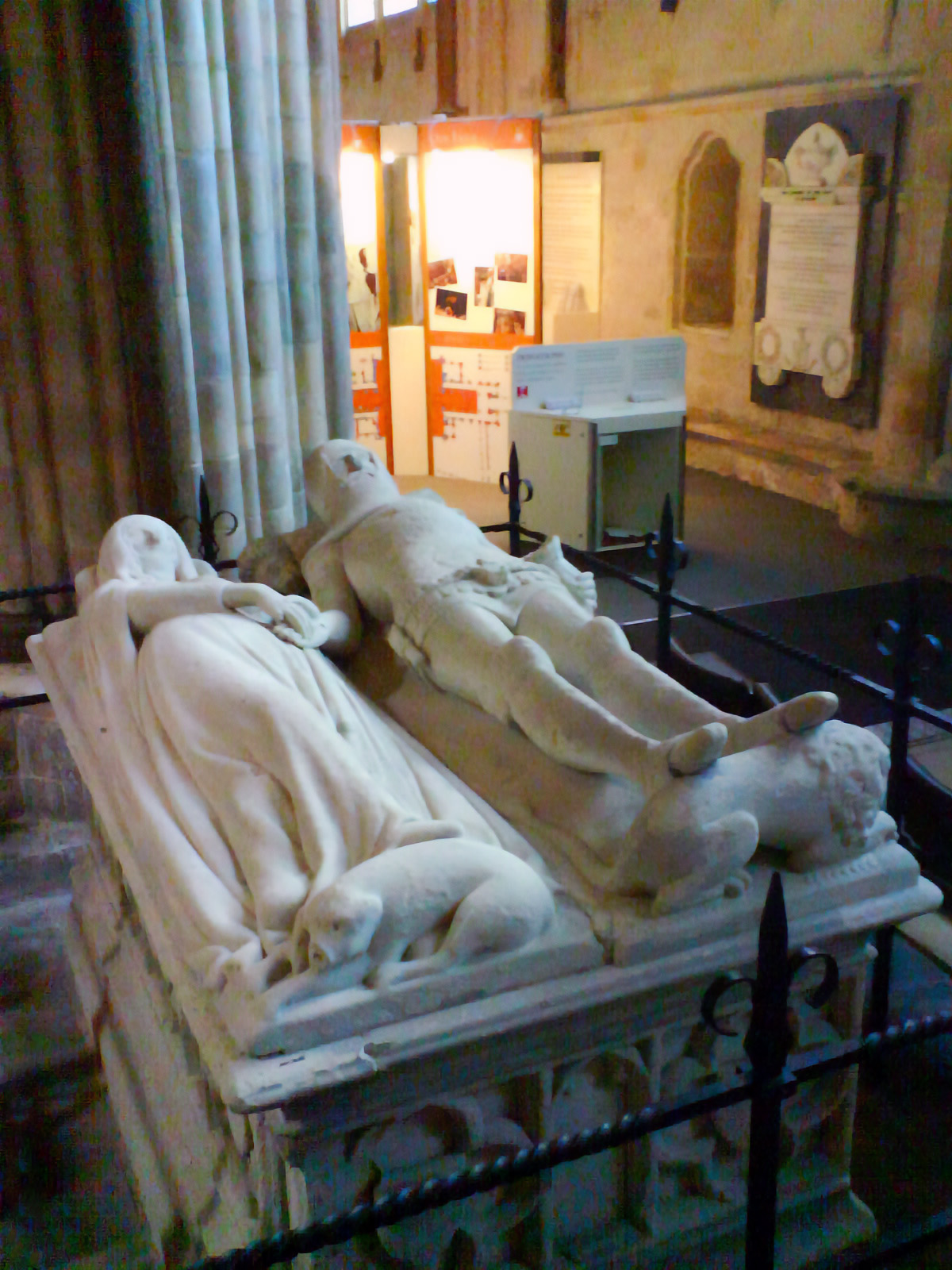
Full length view

The tomb monument in Chichester Cathedral is now widely, though not quite certainly, identified as that of Richard FitzAlan, 10th Earl of Arundel (d. 1376) and his second wife, Eleanor of Lancaster (d. 1372). The couple were buried in the chapter house of Lewes Priory, and their monument may have been fashioned by the master mason Henry Yevele: documentary evidence survives relating to the shipping of two "marble" tombs for them in January 1375 from Poole Harbour to London at Yevele's behest. Having first been erected at Lewes Priory, the effigies were probably moved to Chichester following the priory's dissolution in 1537. The earliest certain record of their presence in the cathedral dates from 1635.

The male figure wears armour, and bears a lion rampant (the arms of the FitzAlan family) on his coat armour, and a lion's head couped as a crest on the helm beneath his head. The female figure wears a veil, wimple, a long gown and a mantle, all characteristic dress of the 14th century; while beneath her gown, her legs are crossed. In a feature common to many English tombs of this period, the knight has a lion at his feet, while the lady has a dog: the lion may indicate valour and nobility, the dog loyalty. He has his right hand ungloved, and her right hand rests on his.

By the 19th century, the Arundel effigies had become badly mutilated, and also separated from one another, being placed against the north wall of the northern outer aisle of the Cathedral, with the woman at the feet of the man. In 1843 Edward Richardson (1812–1869) was commissioned to restore them. It was Richardson who was responsible not only for reuniting them side by side, but also for carving the present joined hands, the originals having been lost. His research was conscientious, and the evidence would suggest that his restoration was reasonably faithful to the original pose. Nevertheless, it was Richardson who was responsible for the precise form of the hands (the lady's right hand resting lightly on the knight's). An additional detail that may have been Richardson's own choice was to depict the knight's empty right-hand gauntlet held in his left hand: he may have found precedents in several hand-joining monuments elsewhere, such as that of c. 1419–20 to Ralph Greene and his wife Katherine Clifton at St Peter's Church, Lowick, Northamptonshire.

The monument is not inscribed, and it is likely that Larkin's reference to "the Latin names around the base" was inspired by a card label placed by the cathedral authorities – which probably, in accordance with the thinking of the time, misidentified the couple as Richard FitzAlan, 11th Earl of Arundel (d. 1397) and his countess.

=== Hand-joining pose ===
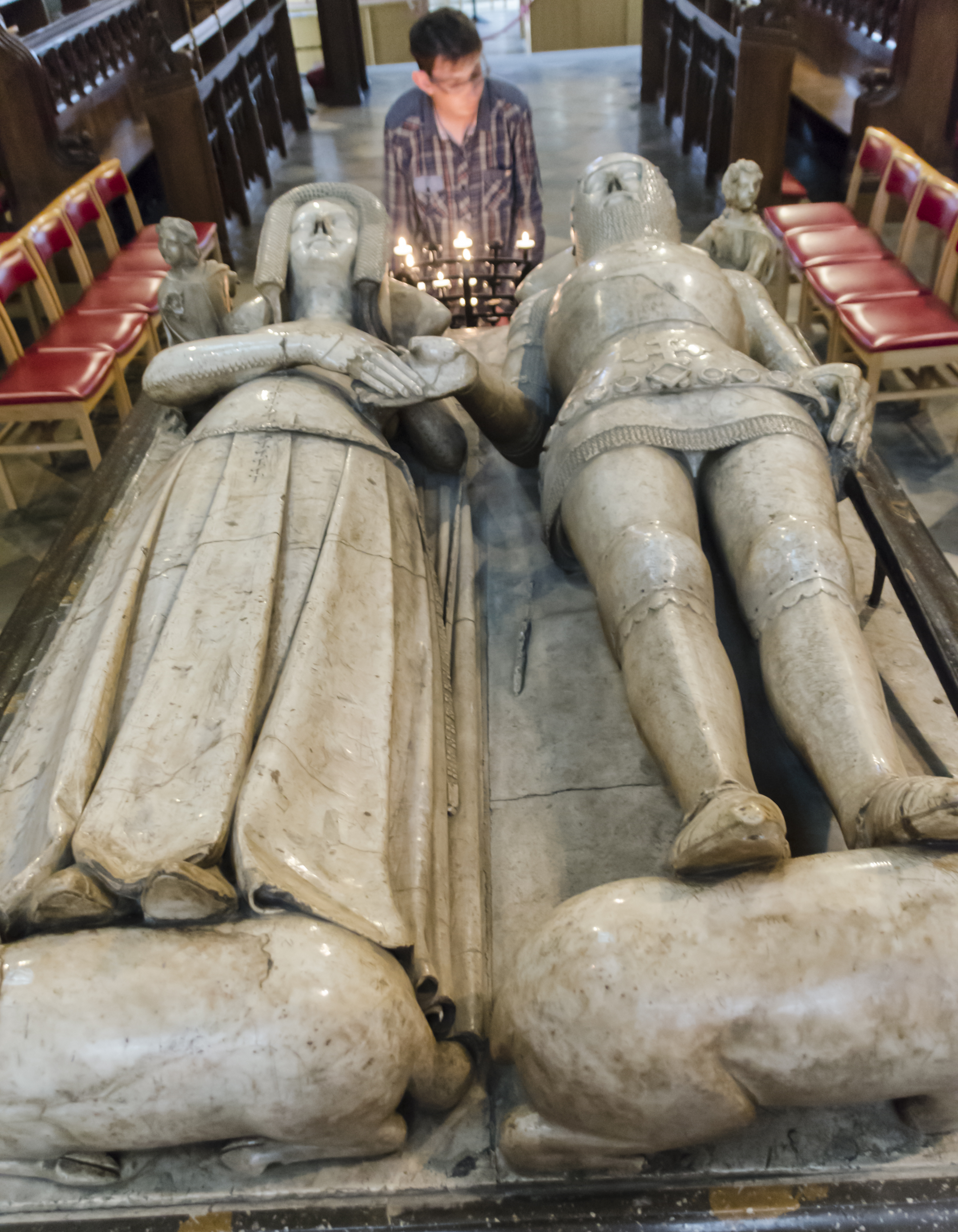
Monument of Thomas de Beauchamp and Katherine Mortimer in St Mary's Church, Warwick

The hand-joining pose is unusual, but by no means unparalleled in England in this period. Three near-contemporary examples were the alabaster effigies of Thomas de Beauchamp, 11th Earl of Warwick (d. 1369) and Katherine Mortimer (d. 1369) in St Mary's Church, Warwick (which survives); the alabaster effigies of John of Gaunt, 1st Duke of Lancaster (d. 1399) and Blanche of Lancaster (d. 1368) in St Paul's Cathedral, London (now lost); and the brass to Sir Miles de Stapleton (d. 1364) and Joan de Ingham at Ingham, Norfolk (also lost). There were close connections between these patrons – Eleanor and Blanche of Lancaster, for example, were aunt and niece – and it is likely that all were fully aware of one another's burial choices. It is also possible that all four monuments were the products of Yevele's workshop: Gaunt's monument was certainly Yevele's work, the Arundel monument probably was, and the Stapleton brass was in a style closely associated with him.

Slightly later examples of the pose, which may have been inspired by the Arundel monument, include two commemorating two of the Earl and Countess's grandchildren: a brass to Sir William Arundel (d. 1400) and his wife Agnes (d. c. 1401) in Rochester Cathedral; and an effigial monument to Elizabeth Fitzalan (d. 1425) and Sir Robert Goushill (d. 1403) at Hoveringham, Nottinghamshire.

Although many modern observers have – like Larkin – read the linking of hands as a sign of romantic love and affection, it seems more likely that the gesture's primary meaning was to signify the formal, legal, and sacramental bonds of matrimony.

== The poem ==
Larkin visited Chichester Cathedral with his lover Monica Jones in January 1956. He later claimed to have been "very moved" by the monument; and in an audio recording of the poem, he stated that the effigies were unlike any he had ever seen before, and that he had found them "extremely affecting". The poem was completed on 20 February. It was first published in the May 1956 issue of the London Magazine.

Larkin draws inspiration from the figures to muse on time, mortality, fidelity and the nature of earthly love. In a letter to Monica written while the poem was still in progress, he identified his "chief idea" as that of the two effigies "lasting so long, & in the end being remarkable only for something they hadn't perhaps meant very seriously". Andrew Motion describes him "using the detail of the hands as the focus for one of his most moving evocations of the struggle between time and human tenderness".

The poem begins:

Side by side, their faces blurred,
The earl and countess lie in stone,
Their proper habits vaguely shown
As jointed armour, stiffened pleat,
And that faint hint of the absurd –
The little dogs under their feet.

— lines 1–6

and concludes:

[...] The stone fidelity
They hardly meant has come to be
Their final blazon, and to prove
Our almost-instinct almost true:
What will survive of us is love.

— lines 38–42

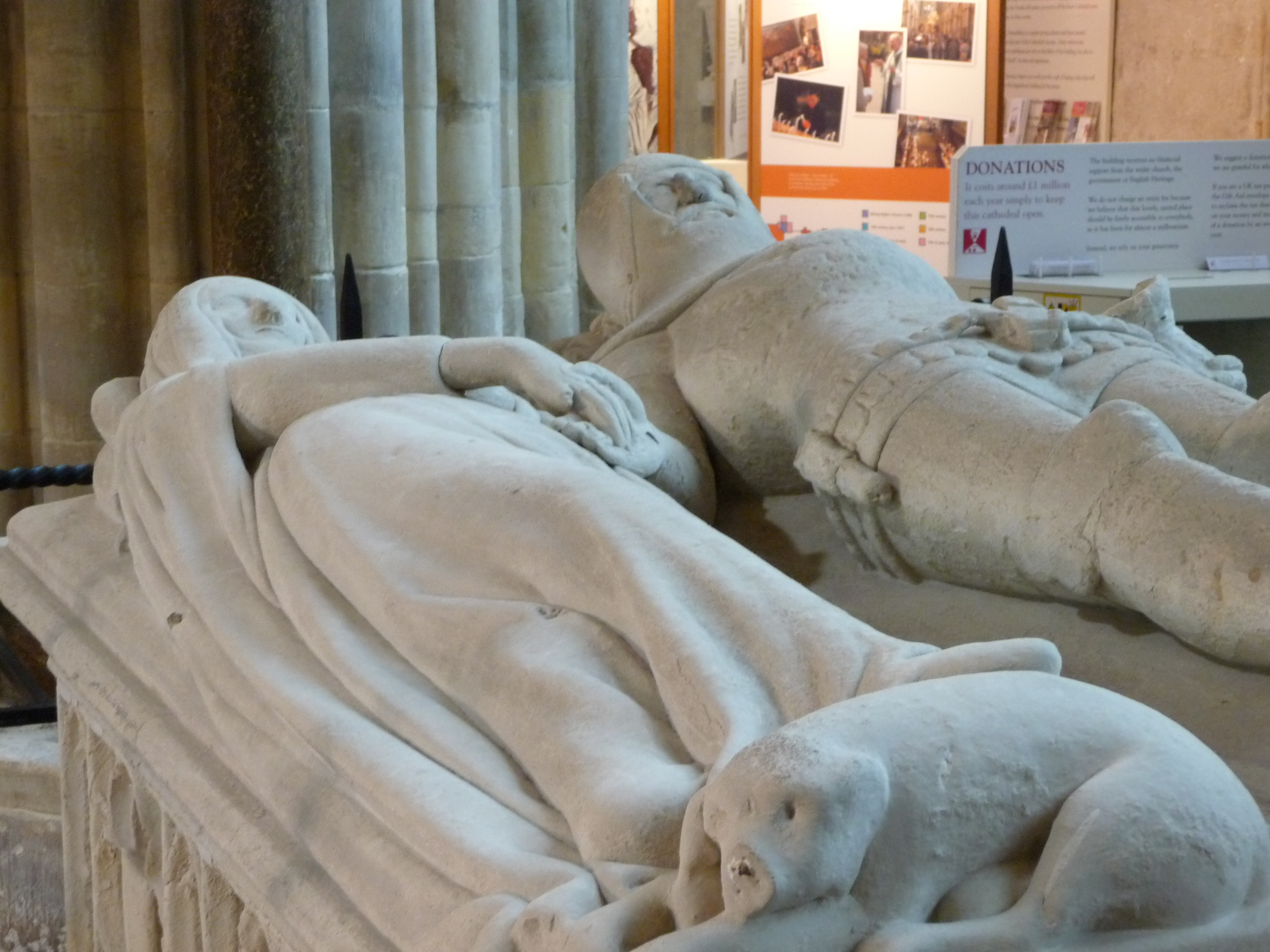
Another view of the monument at Chichester

The final line is among the most quoted of all of Larkin's work. When read out of context, it may be understood as a "sentimental" endorsement of "love enduring beyond the grave". However, the poem as a whole is rather more nuanced, and challenges a simple romantic interpretation, even if in the end it is conceded to have "an inevitable ring of truth – if only because we want so much to hear it". James Booth describes it as possessing a "mix of stark pessimism and yearning despair".

Larkin himself wrote at the end of the manuscript draft of the poem:

Love isn't stronger than death just because statues hold hands for six hundred years.

But he later commented in an interview:

I think what survives of us is love, whether in the simple biological sense or just in terms of responding to life, making it happier, even if it's only making a joke.

Larkin wrote in a letter to Monica Jones, shortly after the poem's first publication, that he found it "embarrassingly bad!", because it was trying to be too clever. In another letter to Robert Conquest he described it as "a bit timey" (i.e. with too much emphasis on time). He later reiterated that he never really liked it, partly because it was unduly romantic, and partly for other reasons:

technically it's a bit muddy in the middle – the fourth and fifth stanzas seem trudging somehow, with awful rhymes like voyage/damage. Everything went wrong with that poem: I got the hands wrong – it's right-hand gauntlet really – and anyway the hands were a nineteenth-century addition, not pre-Baroque at all.

He was disappointed to learn that the hand-joining gesture was not as unusual as he had thought: "A schoolmaster sent me a number of illustrations of other tombs having the same feature, so clearly it is in no way unique."

== Legacy ==
The poem was one of three read at Larkin's memorial service in Westminster Abbey in February 1986. Its two final lines ("Our almost-instinct almost true: / What will survive of us is love.") are also inscribed on the memorial stone to Larkin unveiled in December 2016 in Poets' Corner in the Abbey.

The line "What will survive of us is love" is also inscribed on the gravestone of Maeve Brennan (d. 2003) in Cottingham Cemetery in Yorkshire. Brennan was one of Larkin's lovers and her grave is situated a few metres away from Larkin's in the same cemetery.

== Other poems ==
Other poems appear to have taken inspiration, directly or indirectly, from the same Arundel tomb monument.

- The male effigy, prior to restoration, may have inspired John Keats's 1819 ballad, "La Belle Dame Sans Merci", a suggestion made in 2019 by Richard Marggraf Turley and Jennifer Squire.
- Charles Crocker (1797–1861), verger at Chichester Cathedral and a respected poet, published a sonnet in praise of Richardson's 1843 restoration. It begins:

Thanks, Richardson! whose renovating hand,
Guided by talent, skill, and taste refined,
Hath given to the eye of cultured mind
This relic of a by-gone age to stand
In all its pristine beauty [...]

— lines 1–5

- Gavin Ewart (1916–1995) wrote a poem inspired by Larkin's, entitled "An Arundel Tomb Revisited", about two lovers lying in bed together "like an Arundel tomb", of whom "one takes the hand of the other".

== See also ==
- List of poems by Philip Larkin
