= Aubade =

Morning love song or a song or poem about lovers separating at dawn

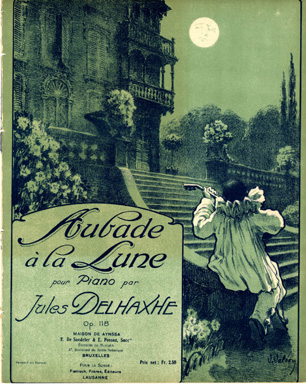
Sheet music for Jules Delhaxhe's Aubade à la Lune

An aubade is a morning love song (as opposed to a serenade, intended for performance in the evening), or a song or poem about lovers separating at dawn. It has also been defined as "a song or instrumental composition concerning, accompanying, or evoking daybreak".

In the strictest sense of the term, an aubade is a song sung by a departing lover to a sleeping woman. Aubades are generally conflated with what are strictly called albas, which are exemplified by a dialogue between parting lovers, a refrain with the word alba, and a watchman warning the lovers of the approaching dawn.

The tradition of aubades goes back at least to the troubadours of the Provençal schools of courtly love in the High Middle Ages. The aubade gained in popularity again with the advent of the metaphysical fashion in the 17th century. John Donne's poem "The Sunne Rising" exemplifies an aubade in English. Aubades were written from time to time in the 18th and 19th centuries. In the 20th century the focus of the aubade shifted from the genre's original specialized courtly-love context into the more generalized theme of a human parting at daybreak. In this reformulated context several notable aubades were published in the 20th century, such as "Aubade" by poet Philip Larkin. French composers of the turn of the 20th century wrote a number of aubades. In 1883, the French composer Emmanuel Chabrier composed an "Aubade" for piano solo, inspired by a four-month visit to Spain. Maurice Ravel included a Spain-inspired aubade entitled "Alborada del gracioso" in his 1906 piano suite Miroirs. An aubade is the centerpiece of Erik Satie's 1915 piano suite Avant-dernières pensées. The composer Francis Poulenc later wrote (in concerto form) a piece titled Aubade; it premiered in 1929.

In 2014 postmodern dancer and choreographer Douglas Dunn presented a piece titled Aubade, with costumes, video and lighting by Charles Atlas, and poetry by Anne Waldman.

Montreal pop-composer Jean-Michel Blais' 2022 album, Aubades, is inspired by the theme.

== See also ==
- Lyric poetry
- Tagelied
- Las Mañanitas, commonly sung in the morning
- Reverdie
