= Days (poem) =

Short poem by Philip Larkin

"Days" is a short poem by Philip Larkin, written in 1953 and included in his 1964 collection The Whitsun Weddings. It is 10 lines long.

== See also ==
- List of poems by Philip Larkin
