= MCMXIV =

English poem by Philip Larkin

"MCMXIV" (1914) is a poem written by English poet Philip Larkin. It was first published in the book The Whitsun Weddings in 1964. The poem, a single sentence spread over four stanzas, begins by describing what is seemingly a photograph of volunteers lining up to enlist, and goes on to reflect on the momentous changes in England that would result from the First World War, ending, 'Never such innocence again'.

== References in popular culture ==
- The first and last lines of the poem are quoted in the film The History Boys.
- MCMXIV is the first single on the Portland, Oregon band Archeology's E.P. Change of Address
- MCMXIV is a single from Chicago, Illinois band Ratboys' album "AOID"

== See also ==
- List of poems by Philip Larkin
