= The Emperor's Newest Clothes =

- Genre: Animation; Comedy; Family; Fantasy; Musical
- Written by: Sheila Nevins
- Directed by: Simón Wilches
- Creative director: Galen Pehrson
- Voices of: Jeff Daniels; John Early; Tim Heidecker; Matt Hobby; Alison Pill; Gabriel Sunday
- Narrated by: Alan Alda
- Composers: William Finn; Michael Starobin
- Country of origin: United States
- Original language: English

Production
- Executive producers: Susan Benaroya; James A. Fino; Jacqueline Glover
- Producers: Josh Hetzler; Sheila Nevins; Casey Rup
- Animators: Sullivan Brown; Simon Estrada; Luke Freitag; Eric Hoff; Lars Ingelman; Galen Pehrson; Richard Ramos; Ilana Morgan Schwartz; Simón Wilches
- Running time: 27 min
- Production companies: Lifeboat Productions; Starburns Industries

Original release
- Network: HBO
- Release: November 15, 2018

The Emperor's Newest Clothes is a 2018 American animated musical television special, based on the classic 1837 fairy tale "The Emperor's New Clothes" by Hans Christian Andersen.

The half-hour special was produced by Lifeboat Productions and Starburns Industries, for HBO Family and features original songs by the late Tony Award-winning composer William Finn.

== Plot ==
The special is set in an old kingdom where the Emperor is a vain, delusional ruler whose every word is considered law. Fearing the loss of their positions or more, his two closest confidantes—Syco the Jester and Phantic the Advisor —adhere to his every pronouncement, no matter how foolish.

The Emperor declares a holiday in his own honor and demands an unparalleled new outfit for the celebration. Two con artists, posing as tailors, are hired. They claim they can weave a miraculous suit of clothes that is invisible only to those who are "incompetent or stupid." The tailors show an empty metal mannequin to Syco, who, afraid of being labeled a fool, praises the non-existent clothing as "glorious and perfect." Phantic repeats this praise to the increasingly impatient Emperor.

Despite his own internal suspicion, the Emperor believes the flattery and wears his "new clothes"—actually only his underwear—to his grand parade. The townsfolk, fearing the consequences of speaking the truth, reluctantly marvel at the imaginary fabric. The silence is finally broken by Thomasina, a perceptive young girl, who loudly exclaims that the Emperor is wearing nothing at all.

== Cast ==
- Alan Alda as the Narrator
- Jeff Daniels as The Emperor
- John Early as Sysco the Jester
- Tim Heidecker as Phantic the Advisor
- Matt Hobby as Tailor #1
- Alison Pill as Thomasina
- Gabriel Sunday as Tailor #2

== Production ==
The special was written and produced by veteran television executive Sheila Nevins. The music and original songs were composed by Finn, known for works such as Falsettos and The 25th Annual Putnam County Spelling Bee.

The director, Simón Wilches-Castro along side Art director Galen Pehrson, opted for a stylized, geometric visual aesthetic. Wilches-Castro cited influences from the Bauhaus movement, particularly artists like Wassily Kandinsky and Paul Klee, and referenced animated films like Yellow Submarine for its musical sequences. The design aimed to be "surreal, cubist, and sometimes nonsensical" to juxtapose with the traditional Broadway style of Finn's songs.

== Reception ==
Reception was generally positive among critics, focusing on the film's whimsical visuals and production.

Emily Ashby of Common Sense Media gave the special a 4/5, stating that the version a fun, worthwhile family pick with bold animation, catchy songs, and valuable lessons about vanity and mob mentality, though some parents found it hard for younger kids.

IMDb gave the special a 5.3/10, with mixed-to-positive reviews. Letterboxd gave it a 3.0, on its site.
