= This Be The Verse =

Poem by Philip Larkin

This Be the Verse is a poem by the English poet Philip Larkin. It was first published in the August 1971 issue of New Humanist and later included in Larkin’s 1974 collection High Windows. The poem is one of Larkin’s most widely known works and remains notable for its dark humour, directness, and taboo-breaking language.

== Text ==
The poem opens with the line:

They fuck you up, your mum and dad,

and concludes with:

Man hands on misery to man. / It deepens like a coastal shelf. / Get out as early as you can, / And don’t have any kids yourself.

The profanity of the first line and the bleak humour of its closing stanza have made the poem one of the most frequently quoted in 20th-century English literature.

== Themes and interpretation ==
The title is taken from a line in Robert Louis Stevenson's 1896 poem "Requiem":

"This be the verse you grave for me."

Larkin's version turns the sentiment upside down, replacing acceptance with cynical inheritance.

Critics have interpreted the poem as both comic and despairing. According to The Cambridge Companion to English Poets (Chapter 29 on Larkin), Larkin "reduces the domestic comedy of human failure to a universal law" while maintaining an ironic tenderness toward his subjects. The poem's conversational tone and metrical precision exemplify Larkin's colloquial modernism—using everyday diction within traditional verse forms.

== Reception and legacy ==
Since its first appearance, This Be the Verse has become one of the most quoted English poems of the 20th century. It continues to appear in anthologies and curricula, though its language has occasionally caused controversy in classroom contexts. Scholars note that despite its cynicism, the poem's metrical control and final imperative ("don't have any kids yourself") lend it an almost moral authority.

== In popular culture ==
The poem has appeared in numerous works in media:

- Referenced in essays by Martin Amis and Clive James in 2001.
- The BBC documentary Philip Larkin: Love and Death in Hull (2003) features a full reading of the poem.
- The antagonist of Daniel Handler’s A Series of Unfortunate Events quotes the final stanza in the 2006 book installment and its 2019 television adaptation.
- A full reading of the poem is recited by Anette Badland’s character May, in Season 3, Episode 11 ("Mom City") of the third series of the television series Ted Lasso. [12]

== See also ==
- Philip Larkin
- High Windows
- List of poems by Philip Larkin
