= Mr Bleaney =

Poem by Philip Larkin

"Mr Bleaney" is a poem by British poet Philip Larkin, written in May 1955. It was first published in The Listener on 8 September 1955 and later included in Larkin's 1964 anthology The Whitsun Weddings.

The speaker in the poem is renting a room and compares his situation to that of its previous occupant, a Mr Bleaney.

Larkin had previously used the surname Bleaney in his first novel Jill in 1946, where Bleaney is named as a classmate of the hero, John Kemp, at "Huddlesford Grammar School", somewhere in Lancashire. But the reader is not told his Christian name or indeed anything else about him. There is nothing to indicate that this is the same Bleaney who eventually occupies the room described in Larkin's poem.

== Structure ==
The poem comprises seven four-line stanzas with a regular rhyme pattern of ABAB. The last sentence spans two stanzas:

But if he stood and watched the frigid wind
Tousling the clouds, lay on the fusty bed
Telling himself that this was home, and grinned,
And shivered, without shaking off the dread

That how we live measures our own nature,
And at his age having no more to show
Than one hired box should make him pretty sure
He warranted no better, I don't know.

— lines 21-28

== See also ==
- List of poems by Philip Larkin
