= The Whitsun Weddings =

Collection of poems by Philip Larkin

- First edition
- Author: Philip Larkin
- Language: English
- Genre: Poetry
- Publisher: Faber & Faber
- Publication place: United Kingdom
- English publication date: 1964
- ISBN: 9780571097104
- Preceded by: The Less Deceived
- Followed by: High Windows

The Whitsun Weddings is a collection of 32 poems by Philip Larkin. It was first published by Faber in the United Kingdom on 28 February 1964. It was a commercial success, by the standards of poetry publication, selling 4,000 copies on its first run. A United States edition appeared some seven months later. In Larkin's lifetime, he would sell 100,000 paperback copies.

It contains many of Larkin's best known poems, such as "The Whitsun Weddings", "Days", "Mr Bleaney", "MCMXIV", and "An Arundel Tomb".

== Poems ==
- Here
- Mr Bleaney
- Nothing To Be Said
- Love Songs in Age
- Naturally the Foundation will Bear Your Expenses
- Broadcast
- Faith Healing
- For Sidney Bechet
- Home is so Sad
- Toads Revisited
- Water
- The Whitsun Weddings
- Self's the Man
- Take One Home for the Kiddies
- Days
- MCMXIV
- Talking in Bed
- The Large Cool Store
- A Study of Reading Habits
- As Bad as a Mile
- Ambulances
- The Importance of Elsewhere
- Sunny Prestatyn
- First Sight
- Dockery and Son
- Ignorance
- Reference Back
- Wild Oats
- Essential Beauty
- Send No Money
- Afternoons
- An Arundel Tomb

== See also ==
- List of poems by Philip Larkin
- 1964 in poetry
