= The Whitsun Weddings (poem) =

Poem by Philip Larkin

"The Whitsun Weddings" is one of the best known poems by British poet Philip Larkin. It was written and rewritten and finally published in the 1964 collection of poems, also called The Whitsun Weddings. It is one of three poems that Larkin wrote about train journeys.

The poem comprises eight stanzas of ten lines, making it one of his longest poems. The rhyming scheme is a, b, a, b, c, d, e, c, d, e (a rhyme scheme similar to that used in various of Keats' odes).

Larkin describes a stopping-train journey southwards from Paragon station in Kingston upon Hull, where he was a librarian at the university, on a hot Whit Saturday afternoon. It has always been supposed the poem was based on an actual train journey Larkin made in 1955 on Whitsun Saturday, a day which was popular for weddings at that time though since there was a rail strike on that weekend Larkin scholar John Osborne now thinks the journey an unlikely one to have taken place. Larkin's letters mention two journeys, one to Grantham (not at Whitsun, some weddings), and one to London (not at Whitsun, no weddings), that may have been conflated in the poem.

The poem's narrator describes the scenery and smells of the countryside and towns through which the largely empty train passes. The train's windows are open because of the heat, and he gradually becomes aware of bustle on the platforms at each station, eventually realising that this is the noise and actions of wedding parties that are seeing off couples who are boarding the train.

He notes the different classes of people involved, each with their own responses to the occasion – the fathers, the uncles, the children, the unmarried female relatives. He imagines the venues where the wedding receptions have been held.

As the train continues into London, with the afternoon shadows lengthening, his reflections turn to the permanence of what the newly-weds have done, yet its significance, though huge for them, seems to give him an ultimately disappointing message, suggested by the poem's final phrase. However, as a counterbalance, rain brings fertility.

[...] there swelled
A sense of falling, like an arrow-shower
Sent out of sight, somewhere becoming rain.

— lines 78-80

Recorded readings of the poem include one by Larkin himself.

== See also ==
- List of poems by Philip Larkin
