= Mauritius (play) =

2007 play by Theresa Rebeck

- Original language: English
- Written by: Theresa Rebeck
- Genre: Drama

Premiere
- Date: October 2006

Mauritius is a play by Theresa Rebeck. It opened on Broadway in 2007.

== Summary ==
The play focuses on two half-sisters, Jackie and Mary, who inherit a stamp collection from Mary’s grandfather which might be worth a fortune. The title refers to the "Blue Mauritius", one of the world's rarest stamps. The sisters become involved with three men, including Phillip, the owner of a stamp store, and Dennis, whose occupation is somewhat mysterious. The characters try to out-do each other in attempting to reap possible rewards from the stamp collection.

== Cast and characters ==
Character	Wimberly Theatre, World Premiere (2006)	Biltmore Theatre, Broadway Premiere (2007)
Sterling	James Gale	F. Murray Abraham
Phillip	Robert Dorfman	Dylan Baker
Dennis	Michael Aronov	Bobby Cannavale
Mary	Laura Latreille	Katie Finneran
Jackie	Marin Ireland	Alison Pill

== Production history ==
Mauritius premiered on Broadway at the Biltmore Theatre on October 4, 2007, and closed November 25, 2007. This play marked the Broadway debut for Rebeck. The play was directed by Doug Hughes with scenic design by John Lee Beatty, costume design by Catherine Zuber and lighting design by Paul Gallo in a Manhattan Theatre Club production. Bobby Cannavale received a Tony Award nomination for Best Performance by a Featured Actor in a Play.

The play had its world premiere in Boston by the Huntington Theatre Company at the Boston Center for the Arts Calderwood Pavilion in October 2006. The play was directed by Rebecca Taichman and starred Marin Ireland as Jackie, Michael Aronov as Dennis, Robert Dorfman, Laura Latreille and James Gale as Sterling.

It was presented at Chicago's Northlight Theatre from February 25 to April 5, 2009.

The play was produced by the Pasadena Playhouse, California opening on April 9, 2009. Direction was by Jessica Kubzansky.

== Reception ==
=== Accolades ===
Year	Award	Category	Nominated work	Result	Ref.
2008	Tony Awards	Best Featured Actor in a Play	Bobby Cannavale	Nominated	
