= Devs (TV series) =

American science fiction thriller TV miniseries (2020)

- Genre: Drama; Science fiction; Techno-thriller
- Created by: Alex Garland
- Written by: Alex Garland
- Directed by: Alex Garland
- Starring: Sonoya Mizuno; Nick Offerman; Jin Ha; Zach Grenier; Cailee Spaeny; Stephen McKinley Henderson; Karl Glusman; Alison Pill
- Composers: Ben Salisbury; Geoff Barrow; The Insects
- Country of origin: United States
- Original language: English
- No. of episodes: 8

Production
- Executive producers: Alex Garland; Andrew Macdonald; Allon Reich; Eli Bush; Scott Rudin; Garrett Basch
- Cinematography: Rob Hardy
- Editor: Jake Roberts
- Running time: 43–57 minutes
- Production companies: DNA TV; FXP

Original release
- Network: FX on Hulu
- Release: March 5 – April 16, 2020

Devs is an American science fiction thriller television miniseries created, written, and directed by Alex Garland. It premiered on March 5, 2020, on FX on Hulu.

The series explores themes related to free will and determinism, as well as Silicon Valley. It received generally positive reviews, with critics praising its imagination, cinematography, acting, and soundtrack.

== Synopsis ==
Lily Chan is a software engineer for Amaya, a quantum computing company run by Forest. Lily soon becomes embroiled in the mysterious death of her boyfriend, who died on the first day of his new job at the Devs team at Amaya.

== Cast and characters ==
=== Main ===
- Sonoya Mizuno as Lily Chan, a software engineer at Amaya
- Nick Offerman as Forest, CEO of Amaya
- Jin Ha as Jamie, a cybersecurity specialist and Lily's ex-boyfriend
- Zach Grenier as Kenton, head of security at Amaya
- Stephen McKinley Henderson as Stewart, a member of the Devs team at Amaya
- Cailee Spaeny as Lyndon, a member of the Devs team specializing in work on sound waves
- Karl Glusman as Sergei Pavlov, Lily's boyfriend and co-worker at Amaya
- Alison Pill as Katie, the chief designer of the Devs system

=== Recurring ===
- Linnea Berthelsen as Jen, Lily's coworker and good friend
- Aimee Mullins as Anya, Lily's coworker
- Jefferson Hall as Pete, a homeless man who sleeps outside Lily's apartment
- Janet Mock as Senator Laine
- Georgia King as Lianne, Forest's wife
- Amaya Mizuno-André as Amaya, Forest's daughter

=== Guest ===
- Brian d'Arcy James as Anton
- David Tse as Lily's father
- Liz Carr as a university lecturer
- Corey Johnson as a psychiatrist

== Episodes ==
No.	Title	Directed by	Written by	Original release date
1	"Episode 1"	Alex Garland	Alex Garland	March 5, 2020
Lily, who works in the encryption division of tech company Amaya, lives with her coworker and boyfriend Sergei in San Francisco. Forest, the CEO of Amaya, gives Sergei a coveted position on Amaya's secretive quantum computing team, known as "Devs". Sergei is shown to the division's elegant and futuristic lab in a bunker protected by a Faraday cage. Sergei asks questions about his responsibilities, but Forest is vague, telling him what he should do will become clear. Sergei surreptitiously records code from the project using his wristwatch. Later that night he is confronted and accused of theft by Forest, who has Kenton, the head of Amaya security, suffocate Sergei to death with a plastic bag. Lily grows worried when Sergei does not come home and reports his disappearance to Kenton and Forest. They show Lily footage appearing to show Sergei walking out of the building and off company grounds. Unconvinced, Lily downloads a backup of Sergei's phone and discovers a suspicious password-protected program disguised as Sudoku, a game Sergei disliked. She contacts her ex-boyfriend Jamie to help her crack the password, but he refuses to help. Lily's friend Jen urgently summons her to work the next morning, where Forest and Kenton show her additional footage of Sergei committing suicide by setting himself on fire.
2	"Episode 2"	Alex Garland	Alex Garland	March 5, 2020
Forest attempts to console Lily by recounting the death of his young daughter, Amaya, and his difficulty in dealing with a reality he considers impossible. Lily convinces Jamie to crack the program on Sergei's phone and finds it is a Russian government messaging program that Sergei—an industrial spy—was using to contact his handler. Kenton meets Forest at his home and advises him to let go of the past. Forest assures him he is, but later uses an interface in the Devs lab, on which the team has achieved a projection of the Crucifixion, to view a projection of his daughter. Lily uses the app to arrange a meeting with Sergei's handler Anton, who tells her Sergei was sent to infiltrate Devs and that he suspects Sergei's death was murder. He offers to bring her on board in Sergei's place. Kenton watches their meeting. Jamie tries to convince Lily not to contact anyone through the Russian program, not knowing she already has, and offers his support. Lily decides to refuse to cooperate with Anton. Kenton follows Anton into a parking garage and tells him he will kill Lily if she starts working for Russia. Anton derides him over Amaya's secrecy and attacks Kenton, stabbing him. Kenton breaks Anton's neck in the struggle, killing him.
3	"Episode 3"	Alex Garland	Alex Garland	March 12, 2020
Senator Laine, who wants to use the Devs technology for the US government, visits Amaya and questions Forest about his work. Chief Devs designer Katie admonishes the Devs team for using the projection system for their own amusement, with member Stewart scorning her hypocrisy. Lily shares her suspicion that Sergei was murdered with her co-workers, and they advise her to tell Kenton. Jen mentions that Lily has struggled with schizophrenia in the past, which Kenton reports back to Forest. While meeting with Kenton, Lily seems to have a breakdown and climbs out onto a high window ledge, in full view of Forest and the senator. While Kenton talks Lily down, Jen copies data from his computer onto a flash drive—Lily, with Jen's help, was feigning schizophrenia to get the security footage from the night of Sergei's death. Lily watches the footage with Jamie, who notices that the flames on the screen are not real, but digital effects. In a flashback, Kenton is shown staging Sergei's suicide.
4	"Episode 4"	Alex Garland	Alex Garland	March 19, 2020
Watching projections of the future, Forest reveals to Katie that Lily will die in two days. Lily and Jamie argue over whether to contact the police. Kenton waits for Lily outside her apartment, where Pete, a local homeless man, treats him with suspicion and offers Lily his support. Kenton pressures Lily into seeing a psychiatrist, with whom she discusses her past drug use and her distant relationship with her mother, who remarried and moved to Hong Kong after Lily's father died. Lyndon develops a new algorithm based on the many-worlds interpretation—rather than the deterministic De Broglie–Bohm theory favored by Forest—that enables clear sound to be heard on the Devs projections, but Forest rejects Lyndon's work and fires him. In the car, Kenton lies to Lily that the doctor said she was psychotic and a suicide risk. When Lily realizes Kenton is driving her somewhere unknown, she grabs the wheel and crashes the car; the impact knocks Kenton unconscious, allowing Lily to escape. Katie applies Lyndon's algorithm to light waves, resulting in clear color images, and calls up a projection of Forest's daughter Amaya, causing him to weep. Lily runs to Jamie's apartment and calls the police to report Sergei's death as a murder. The police arrive, accompanied by the psychiatrist and Kenton, arrest Lily for causing the crash, and take her away for psychiatric commitment, while Kenton brutally forces Jamie back inside his apartment.
5	"Episode 5"	Alex Garland	Alex Garland	March 26, 2020
Katie views projections of events from various points in time in the Devs lab, including Kenton torturing Jamie, Lily at age ten playing Go with her father and talking to him on his deathbed, Sergei and Lily's first meeting and first admission of love for each other, Forest recruiting Katie at a lecture on the superposition of quantum particles after she argues with the professor for disregarding the many-worlds interpretation, the Devs team working on an early projection trial, Forest witnessing the car accident that killed his wife and daughter (superimposed with various realities, including some in which they arrive home safely), Katie talking to Forest about his reasons for starting Devs, Kenton telling Forest and Katie that he will give them up to the authorities rather than go to jail himself, Lily falling to her death inside the Devs lab, and finally, Jamie telling his family to go into hiding before sneaking a heavily sedated Lily out of the psychiatric ward, which Katie watches with a smile.
6	"Episode 6"	Alex Garland	Alex Garland	April 2, 2020
Lyndon breaks into Stewart's RV and asks him to help get his Devs job back, as he is unwilling to abandon his work on the project. Lily awakes in the Napa motel Jamie brought her to and, realizing they cannot run, decides to return to San Francisco and confront Forest at his house. They find him there with Katie, who Forest says can answer Lily's questions. Katie confirms that she and Forest are lovers and that Sergei was killed by Kenton. By way of the Socratic method, Katie explains to Lily the true nature of the Devs system – a powerful computer that can show the actions of any subject in the past or future. However, future projections cease at a certain point in time, beyond which there is only impenetrable static, due to a supposed breakdown of the laws of physics. Katie tells Lily that this event is now only 21 hours away, and she believes Lily, who has been seen entering the Devs lab in the future, is the cause. Katie's deterministic view angers Lily, and she leaves with Jamie; Kenton, who had been watching them since they arrived, follows them. Lily goes back home, and invites Jamie into her bed, where they kiss.
7	"Episode 7"	Alex Garland	Alex Garland	April 9, 2020
Lyndon goes to Katie to regain his job at the now-fully-operational Devs. She tells him he can rejoin the project if he proves his faith in the many-worlds interpretation by standing at a perilous height overlooking the Crystal Springs Dam, proposing that he will only be conscious of the worlds in which he does not fall to his death. He adheres to this vision, but falls and dies in the present world while the viewer hears Stewart reciting Aubade by Philip Larkin. Forest arrives at Devs and meets Stewart just inside the entrance, while Stewart continues his recitation of Aubade. Stewart challenges Forest's hubris at seeking to control the world despite his ignorance of history and the past. Lily and Jamie resume their relationship, and she tells him she plans on proving the Devs team is delusional by not showing up when the machine predicts she will. However, Kenton enters her apartment, fatally shoots Jamie, and attempts to strangle her, but is killed by Pete. Pete reveals himself as a Russian agent who had been supervising Sergei. He presents Lily with a choice: go to the CIA, or leave for Hong Kong and never return to the US. Instead, Lily heads to Devs.
8	"Episode 8"	Alex Garland	Alex Garland	April 16, 2020
Stewart stands just inside the Devs entrance tunnel, reciting portions of "The Second Coming" by W. B. Yeats. Inside the Devs labs, Forest shows Lily a projection of what she is about to do: holding Forest at gunpoint, Lily will force him into the capsule leading out of Devs and shoot him. The capsule will crash, and Lily will die in the fall; beyond this point, Devs can see nothing. Forest tells Lily that their actions have been predetermined and that the system's real name is Deus. Lily leads Forest into the capsule as projected, but as the doors close, she discards the gun, shocking Forest. Stewart causes the capsule to crash, killing Forest and Lily. Before he walks away, Stewart tells a devastated Katie that the system had to be stopped. Lily suddenly regains consciousness on the day before Sergei joined Devs, and finds an empty field where the Devs building once stood, where Forest is playing with his wife and daughter. He tells her that they now exist in a simulation inside the Devs system, where the two of them are the only ones who remember what happened. In the real world, an emotional Katie reveals the Devs system to Senator Laine, and asks her to help keep it turned on. Inside Devs, Lily rejects Sergei and seeks a reconciliation with Jamie.

== Production ==
=== Development ===
On March 13, 2018, it was announced that FX had given the production a pilot order. The pilot was written by Alex Garland, who also directed and executive produced the episode. On July 23, 2018, Rob Hardy mentioned in an interview that he would serve as the cinematographer for the series.

On August 3, 2018, it was announced during the Television Critics Association's annual summer press tour that FX had decided to bypass the pilot process and instead were giving the production a straight-to-series order consisting of eight episodes. Additional executive producers include Andrew Macdonald, Allon Reich, Eli Bush, and Scott Rudin.

Garland appeared at the New York Comic Con and explained his reasoning behind the creation of the series: "I read more about science than anything else, and it started with two things. One was getting my head around this principle of determinism, which basically says that everything that happens in the world is based on cause and effect...That has all sorts of implications for us. One is that it takes away free will, but the other is that if you are at a computer powerful enough, you could use determinism to predict the future and understand the past. If you unravel everything about you, about the specifics of you why you prefer a cup of coffee to tea...then five seconds before you said you'd like to have a cup of coffee one would be able to predict you'd ask for it." In November 2019, it was announced the show would premiere on Hulu instead of FX, as part of "FX on Hulu". On January 9, 2020, it was announced that the series would premiere on March 5, 2020.

=== Casting ===
Alongside the series order announcement, it was confirmed that Sonoya Mizuno, Nick Offerman, Jin Ha, Zach Grenier, Stephen McKinley Henderson, Cailee Spaeny, and Alison Pill had been cast in the series' main roles. Amaya Mizuno-André, who plays Forest's daughter Amaya, is Sonoya Mizuno's niece.

=== Filming ===
Filming on the series had begun by August 2018, with scenes shot at UC Santa Cruz.

== Release ==
The first teaser for the series was released October 5, 2019. The first two episodes of the series were released on March 5, 2020, with the rest debuting weekly on Hulu under the label "FX on Hulu". In India, the series premiered on Hotstar on March 6, 2020. The series premiered on BBC Two in the UK on April 15, 2020, with the whole series available on iPlayer at the same time. On September 23, 2020, Fox Greece picked up the series and began airing it on September 28, 2020. The series is available to stream on Disney+ via the Star content hub.

== Reception ==
=== Audience viewership ===
According to Whip Media's TV Time, Devs was the second most anticipated new television series of March 2020, and the tenth rising show, based on the week-over-week growth in episodes watched for a specific program, during the week of March 15, 2020. In January 2021, it was reported that Devs was one of FX on Hulu's most-watched series to date, surpassed by A Teacher.

=== Critical response ===
The series has an 82% rating with an average score of 7.7 out of 10 based on 90 reviews on Rotten Tomatoes. The site's critical consensus reads: "A hauntingly beautiful meditation on humanity, Devs' slow unfurling may test some viewers' patience, but fans of Alex Garland's singular talents will find much to chew on." On Metacritic, it has a score of 71 out of 100 based on 32 reviews, indicating "generally favorable reviews".

Brian Tallerico of RogerEbert.com found Devs to be a highly philosophical and intellectual sci-fi and called it "stunningly ambitious." He stated, "It's ultimately an unforgettable and rewarding experience." Tallerico praised Garland's work and concluded by writing, "one of the best new shows in a long time." Brian Lowry of CNN called the series audacious, summarizing that it is "a mind-blowing concept that doesn't entirely come together at the close, but which remains unsettling and provocative throughout." Alan Sepinwall of Rolling Stone rated the series 4 out of 5 stars, praised the performances of the actors, and complimented writing and the score, saying, "Alex Garland's new sci-fi series is a confounding and mesmerizing trip into a scary near-future." Martin Brown of Common Sense Media rated the series 3 out of 5 stars, praised the depiction of positive messages and role models, writing, "Devs poses ethical and moral questions about the nature of technology. Characters don't always act for the greater good, but some are driven by a sense of what is right," and complimented the diversity of the cast members.

In a more mixed review from The New York Times, James Poniewozik wrote that "It showcases what Garland does well—ideas and atmosphere—while amplifying his weaknesses in character and plot. As the techies say, it scales—for better and for worse." In a more negative review, Sophie Gilbert of The Atlantic wrote that "Devs is only the latest in a series of puzzle-box shows more preoccupied with their own cleverness and their labyrinthine twists than with the burden of watchability."

The New York Times interviewed theoretical physicist Sean Carroll about sweeping statements about humanity and determinism made by the creators of Devs and Westworld. When asked which show he preferred, Carroll responded, "I was very impressed with how [Devs' creators] were doing something very, very different. I thought it was a very well done show. It was slow and contemplative, but that's a perfectly good change of pace from what we ordinarily see in action movies".

Liam Gaughan of Collider called Devs "the best hard sci-fi show", praising the performances, emotional tone, and how it explored the multiverse concept.

=== Accolades ===
Year	Award	Category	Nominee(s)	Result	Ref.
2020	Primetime Emmy Awards	Outstanding Cinematography for a Limited Series or Movie	Rob Hardy (for "Episode 7")	Nominated	
2020	Primetime Emmy Awards	Outstanding Sound Editing for a Limited Series, Movie, or Special	Glenn Freemantle, Ben Barker, Gillian Dodders, James Wichall, Danny Freemantle, Robert Malone, Dayo James, Nicholas Freemantle, Lily Blazewicz and Emilie O'Connor (for "Episode 3")	Nominated	
2020	Primetime Emmy Awards	Outstanding Sound Mixing for a Limited Series or Movie	Lisa Piñero, Mitch Low, Howard Bargroff and Glen Gathard (for "Episode 3")	Nominated	
2020	Primetime Emmy Awards	Outstanding Special Visual Effects in a Supporting Role	Andrew Whitehurst, Sarah Tulloch, Anne Akande, Samantha Townend, Giacomo Mineo, Tom Hales, George Kyparissous, Stafford Lawrence and Jon Uriarte (for "Episode 8")	Nominated	
2020	British Society of Cinematographers Awards	Best Cinematography in a Television Drama	Rob Hardy	Nominated	
2021	British Academy Television Craft Awards	Best Photography & Lighting: Fiction	Rob Hardy	Nominated	
2021	Critics' Choice Super Awards	Best Actor in a Science Fiction/Fantasy Series	Nick Offerman	Nominated	
2021	Motion Picture Sound Editors Awards	Outstanding Achievement in Sound Editing - Sound Effects and Foley for Episodic Long Form Broadcast Media	Glenn Freemantle, Ben Barker, Danny Freemantle, Nick Freemantle, Rob Malone, Dayo James, Lilly Blazewicz, Peter Burgis and Zoe Freed (for "Episode 3")	Nominated	

== See also ==
- Laplace's demon
