= Bobby Cannavale =

American actor (born 1970)

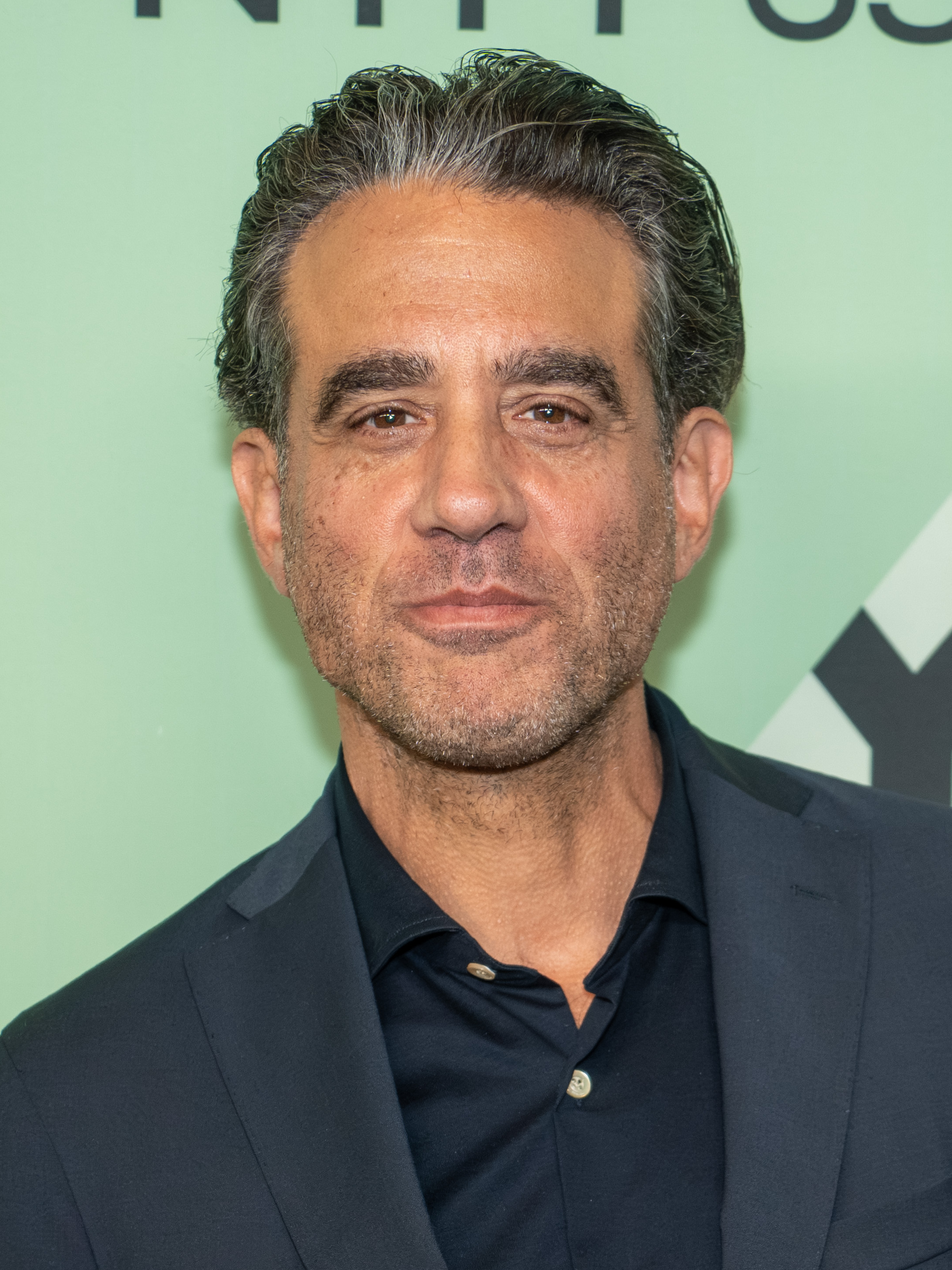
- Cannavale in 2025
- Born: Robert Michael Cannavale; May 3, 1970 (age 56); Union City, New Jersey, U.S.
- Occupation: Actor
- Years active: 1996–present
- Spouse: Jenny Lumet (m. 1994; div. 2003)
- Partner: Rose Byrne (2012–present)
- Children: 3, including Jake Cannavale
- Relatives: Enzo Cannavale (uncle)

Robert Michael Cannavale (/ˌkænəˈvɑːli/ kan-uh-VAH-lee; born May 3, 1970) is an American actor. His breakthrough came with the leading role as FDNY Paramedic Roberto "Bobby" Caffey in the NBC series Third Watch, a role he played from 1999 to 2001.

Cannavale then had roles on Will & Grace in 2005 and a recurring role on Nurse Jackie (2012, 2013). He also starred as a main antagonist while portraying Gyp Rosetti in season 3 of Boardwalk Empire in 2013. Other television roles include Vinyl, Mr. Robot, Blue Bloods and Master of None. He has also starred in the Amazon Prime series Homecoming (2018–20), the Hulu series Nine Perfect Strangers (2021), and Netflix's The Watcher (2022).

Cannavale made his Broadway debut in the 2008 Theresa Rebeck play Mauritius. In 2011, he starred in the Stephen Adly Guirgis comedic play The Motherfucker with the Hat. He portrayed Richard Roma in the 2012 revival of David Mamet's Glengarry Glen Ross.

Cannavale has acted in the drama films The Station Agent (2003), Win Win (2011), Blue Jasmine (2013), I, Tonya (2017), Motherless Brooklyn (2019), The Irishman (2019), and Blonde (2022) as well as the comedy films Paul Blart: Mall Cop (2009), The Other Guys (2010), Annie (2014), Spy (2015), and Jumanji: Welcome to the Jungle (2017). He entered the Marvel Cinematic Universe (MCU) portraying Jim Paxton in Ant-Man (2015) and Ant-Man and the Wasp (2018). He has voiced recurring roles for the animated Netflix series BoJack Horseman and Big Mouth, and provided voice acting work for The Nut Job 2: Nutty by Nature, Ferdinand (both 2017), Tom & Jerry, Sing 2 (both 2021) and Under the Boardwalk (2023).

== Early life ==
Cannavale was born on May 3, 1970, in Union City, New Jersey, where he grew up, the son of Isabel and Salvatore "Sal" Cannavale. His father was of Italian descent, while his mother is Cuban and moved to the U.S. in 1960. His uncle was Enzo Cannavale, an Italian actor who performed in the Academy Award–winning Cinema Paradiso. He was raised Catholic and attended St. Michael's Catholic School, where he participated in a number of extracurricular activities, including being an altar boy and member of the chorus.

When he was eight, Cannavale secured the plum role of the lisping boy, Winthrop, in his school's production of The Music Man and later played a gangster in Guys and Dolls, which cemented his love for performing. Cannavale's parents divorced when he was 13 and his mother moved the family to Puerto Rico. After two years in the American territory, they settled in Margate, Florida. From 1983 to 1986, Cannavale attended Coconut Creek High School, but during his senior year, he was expelled "for being a cutup." He then returned to New Jersey to live with his grandmother, in order to be closer to New York to launch his acting career and went to summer school to earn a diploma from Union Hill High School.

== Career ==
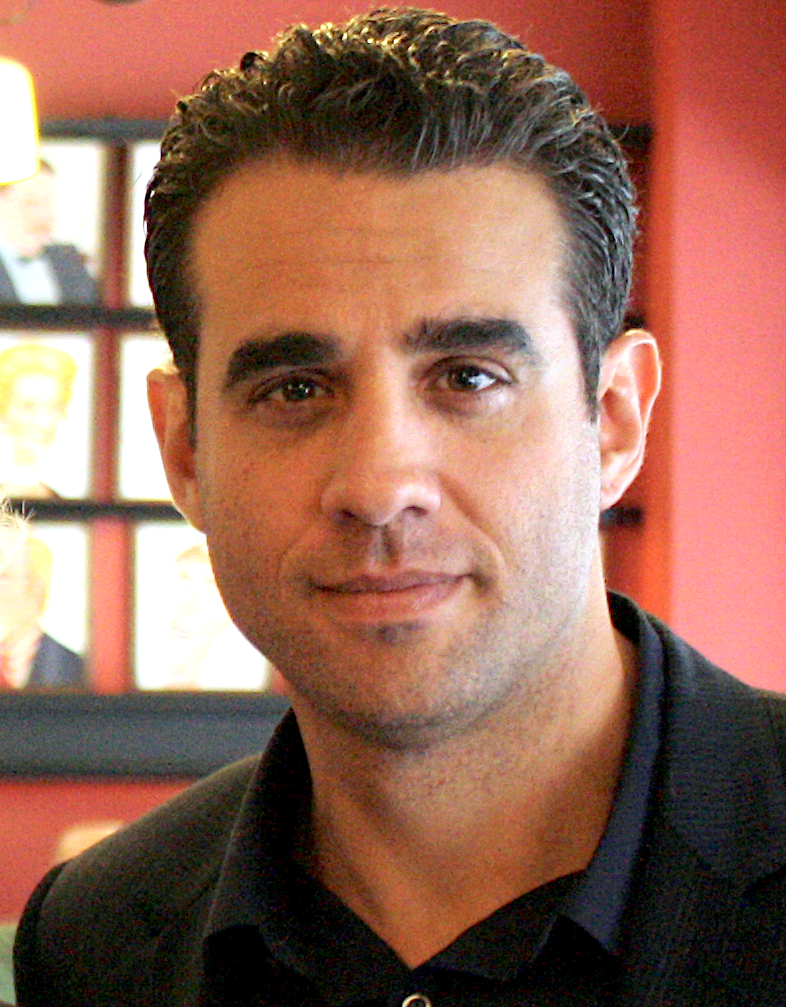
Cannavale in 2009

Cannavale began his acting career in the theater – with no acting training – and gained early film roles in Night Falls on Manhattan (1997) and The Bone Collector (1999), Cannavale became well known when he starred as Bobby Caffey for two seasons on Third Watch. Following this, in 2001, he starred with Alan Arkin in 100 Centre Street – which was written and directed by Sidney Lumet, his then-father-in-law.

In 2002, he joined the cast of Ally McBeal for the last five episodes, but the show was then cancelled. Following this, he starred with Yancey Arias and Sheryl Lee in the miniseries Kingpin. In 2003, Cannavale briefly appeared on the last two episodes of Oz. He also appeared in the film The Station Agent as a man who befriends a little person removed from society. From 2004 to 2006, he had a recurring guest role on Will & Grace as Vince D'Angelo, the boyfriend (and eventual husband) of Will Truman (Eric McCormack). However, in the reboot, they are revealed not to be married. For this role, he won the Primetime Emmy Award for Outstanding Guest Actor in a Comedy Series in 2005. He has also appeared in the films The Guru (2002), Shall We Dance? (2004), Romance & Cigarettes (2005) and Snakes on a Plane, and guest-starred in Sex and the City, Six Feet Under, Law & Order – and its spin-off series Law & Order: Criminal Intent and Law & Order: Special Victims Unit. He appeared in The Take (2007) as Agent Steve Perelli, alongside John Leguizamo and Tyrese Gibson.

Cannavale serves as the voice of Corado R. Ciarlo, known as "Babe", in the Ken Burns PBS film series The War (the story of World War II) from the perspective of the men who fought in combat and their loved ones at home. He also read the audiobook versions of Richard Price's 2008 novel Lush Life and Ed Falco's 2012 novel The Family Corleone. On August 25, 2008, ABC ordered his pilot Cupid, a remake of the 1998 program which had starred Jeremy Piven and Paula Marshall, to series. In the new version of the series, Cannavale starred opposite Sarah Paulson with script development overseen by original series creator Rob Thomas. Cupid premiered on March 31, 2009, but was cancelled by ABC after less than two months, on May 19, 2009.

In 2008, he received a Tony Award nomination for his role as Dennis in the Broadway play, Mauritius. In 2009, CBS announced Cannavale would reprise his role of Det. Eddie Saccardo on the television show, Cold Case, for three episodes, starting with the third episode of Season 7. Cannavale was in the film The Other Guys (2010), and played the role of Terry Delfino in the film Win Win (2011). He later starred in the Broadway play The Motherfucker with the Hat alongside Chris Rock and Annabella Sciorra. On May 3, 2011 (his 41st birthday), he was nominated for a Tony Award for his leading role in that production.

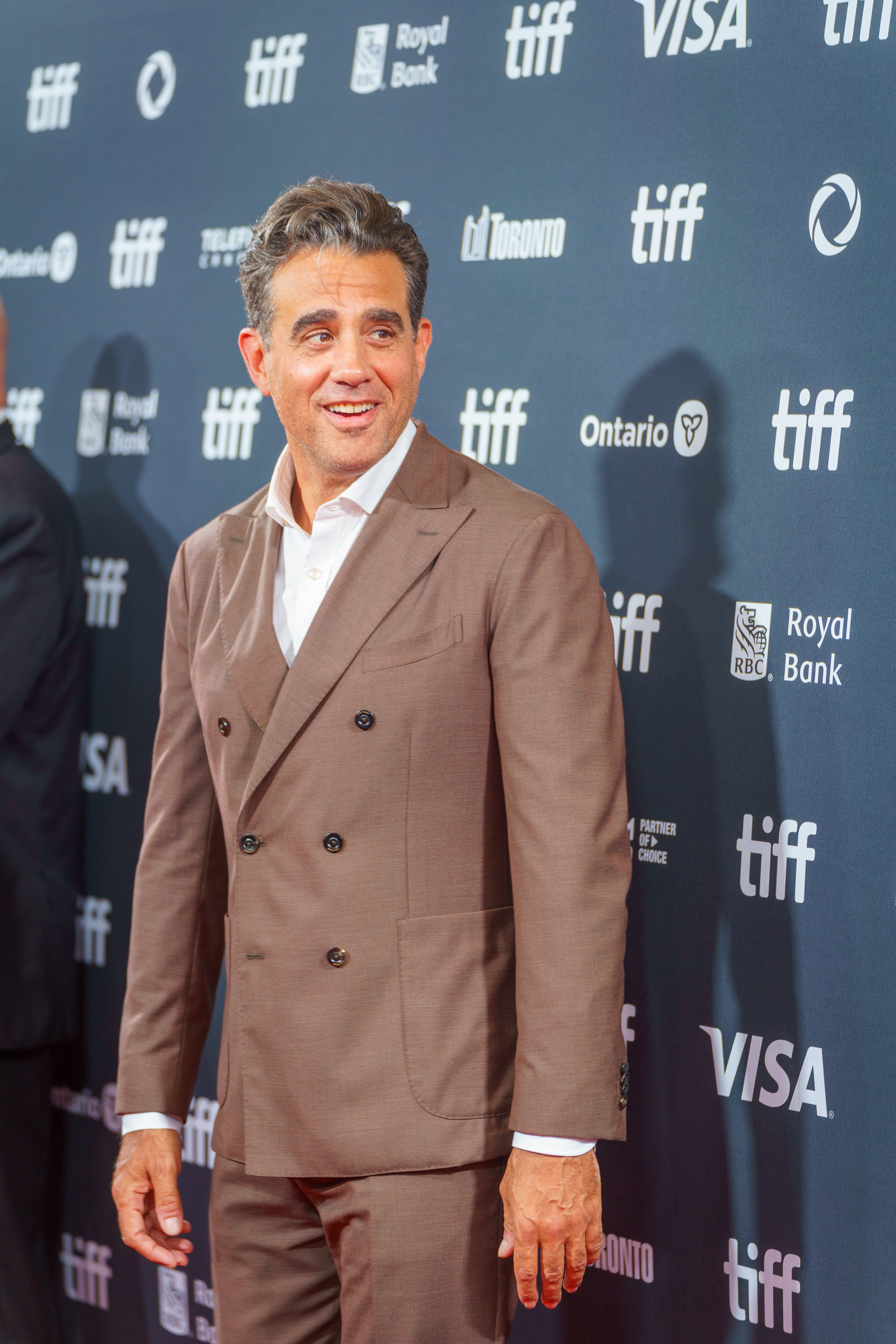
Cannavale at the Toronto International Film Festival in 2024

In 2012 and 2013, he guest-starred in the fourth and fifth seasons of Showtime's Nurse Jackie, for which he was nominated twice again for the Primetime Emmy Award for Outstanding Guest Actor in a Comedy Series in 2012 and 2013, as well as joining the cast of HBO's Boardwalk Empire, portraying the psychopathic Sicilian gangster Gyp Rosetti in the third season. His performance on Boardwalk Empire won critical acclaim, earning him the Primetime Emmy Award for Outstanding Supporting Actor in a Drama Series in 2013. That same year he also played Lewis, a vengeful clown on Modern Family during the third season, for which he was nominated for Best Guest Performer in a Comedy Series at the 2nd Critics' Choice Television Awards in 2012. TV Guide, in its "Cheers & Jeers 2012" issue, praised Cannavale for this "trifecta of great performances", commenting, "This guy is so good at playing bad, it's scary." He played what Matt Zoller Seitz of RogerEbert.com called a "heroically moving" lead role in Danny Collins in 2015.

Since 2015, Cannavale has been involved with voice-over work for Playing On Air, a non-profit organization that "records short plays [for public radio and podcast] written by top playwrights and performed by outstanding actors." He has starred in three short plays, including Crazy Eights by David Lindsay-Abaire, co-starring Rosie Perez and John Leguizamo; Mere Mortals by David Ives; and 2 Dads by David Auburn.

In January 2020, Cannavale appeared with his real-life partner Rose Byrne in the play Medea, written and directed by Simon Stone. In 2021, Cannavale played Tony Hogburn in the Nicole Kidman-led Hulu miniseries Nine Perfect Strangers (based on the novel of the same name by Liane Moriarty), which also featured Melissa McCarthy, Michael Shannon, Luke Evans, Samara Weaving, and Asher Keddie. In 2022, Cannavale was seen portraying Dean Braddock in the 2022 Netflix series The Watcher.

== Personal life ==
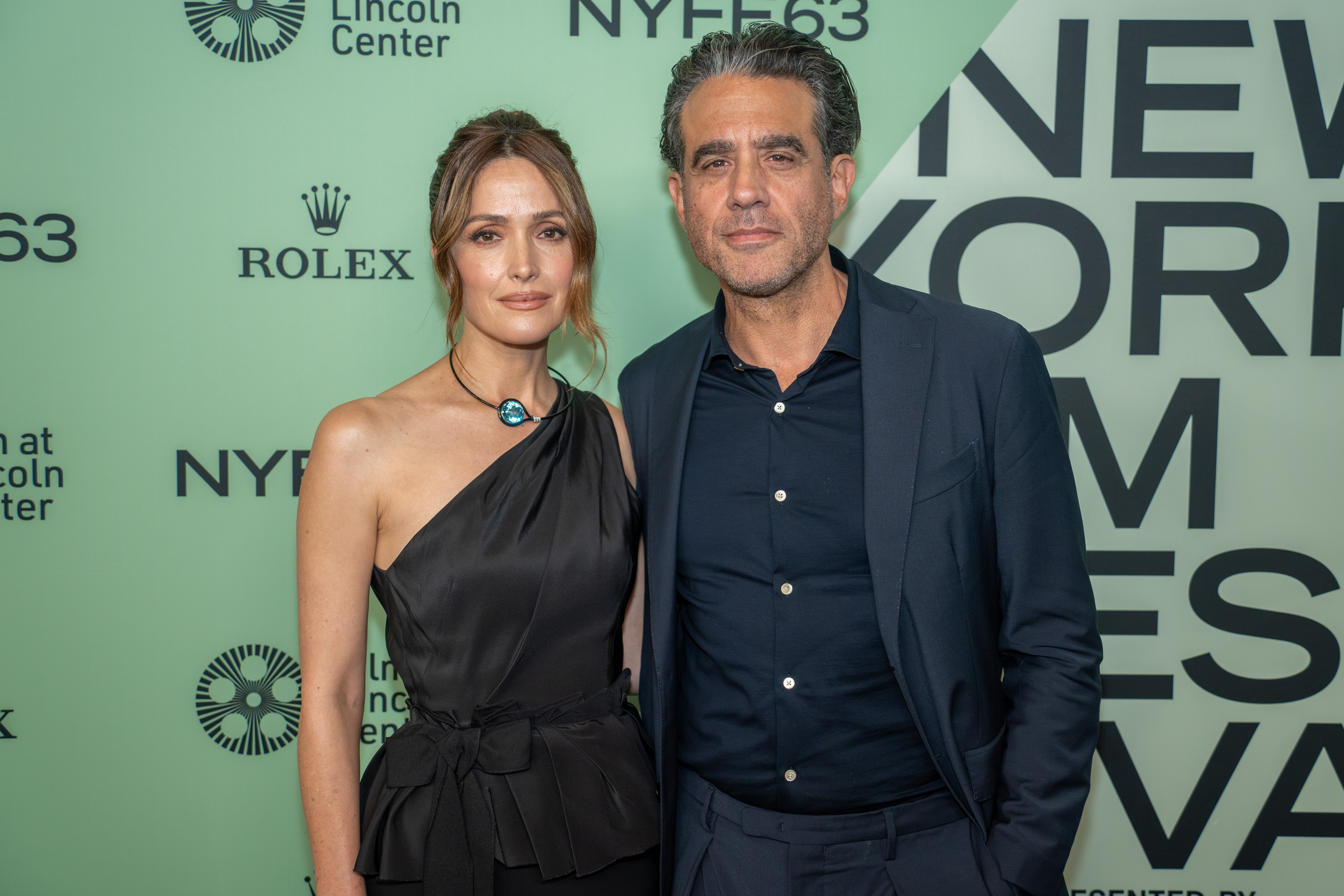
Cannavale with Rose Byrne in 2025

From 1994 to 2003, Cannavale was married to actress/screenwriter Jenny Lumet – director Sidney Lumet's daughter and performer Lena Horne's granddaughter – with whom he has a son, actor Jake Cannavale. Cannavale and Jake were cast as father and son in season four of Nurse Jackie. From 2004 to 2007, he was in a relationship with Annabella Sciorra. Cannavale has been in a relationship with Australian actress Rose Byrne since 2012. Their first son was born in 2016, and a second son in 2017.

== Acting credits ==
=== Film ===
Year	Title	Role	Notes
1996	Night Falls on Manhattan	Vigoda Assistant #1	
1999	Gloria	Jack Jesus Nunez	
1999	The Bone Collector	Detective Steve	
2000	3 A.M.	Jose	
2002	Washington Heights	Angel	
2002	The Guru	Randy	
2003	Shortcut to Happiness	Cop	
2003	The Station Agent	Joe Oramas	
2004	Fresh Cut Grass	Billy Pecchio	
2004	Haven	Lieutenant	
2004	Shall We Dance?	Chic	
2004	The Breakup Artist	Neighbor	
2005	Happy Endings	Javier Duran	
2005	Romance & Cigarettes	Chetty Jr. / "Fryburg"	
2006	The Night Listener	Jess	
2006	Fast Food Nation	Mike	
2006	Snakes on a Plane	Henry "Hank" Harris	
2006	10 Items or Less	Bobby	
2007	The Ten	Marty McBride	
2007	Dedication	Don Meyers	
2008	The Take	Agent Steve Perelli	
2008	Diminished Capacity	Lee Vivyan	
2008	The Promotion	Mark Timms	
2008	100 Feet	Lou Shanks	
2009	Paul Blart: Mall Cop	Commander James Kent	
2009	The Merry Gentleman	Michael Elkhart	
2009	Brief Interviews with Hideous Men	Subject #40	
2009	Louis C.K.'s Last Chance	Porn Producer	Short film
2010	F—K	Bobby	Short film
2010	The Other Guys	Jimmy	
2010	Apples	Nino	Short film
2010	Weakness	Joshua Polansky	
2011	Win Win	Terry Delfino	
2011	Roadie	Randy Stevens	
2013	Movie 43	Superman	Segment: "Super Hero Speed Dating"
2013	Parker	Jake Fernandez	
2013	Lovelace	Butchie Peraino	
2013	Blue Jasmine	Chili	
2014	Chef	Tony	
2014	Adult Beginners	Danny	
2014	Annie	Guy Danlily	
2015	Danny Collins	Tom Donnelly	
2015	Spy	Sergio De Luca	
2015	Ant-Man	Jim Paxton	
2015	Daddy's Home	Emilio Francisco	
2016	The Fundamentals of Caring	Cash	Uncredited
2017	Hair	Bobby Cannavale	Short film
2017	The Nut Job 2: Nutty by Nature	Frankie (voice)	
2017	I, Tonya	Martin Maddox	
2017	Jumanji: Welcome to the Jungle	Professor Russell Van Pelt	Credited as Van Pelt (Note: In Jumanji: Welcome to the Jungle, Van Pelt has a different first name depending on the region in which the film is watched. In the UK version of the film, the character's first name is given as "John Hardin", while in the US version of the film, the character is provided the first name "Russell".)
2017	Ferdinand	Valiente/Valiente's father (voice)	
2017	The Photographer	Photographer	Short film
2018	Boundaries	Leonard	
2018	Ant-Man and the Wasp	Jim Paxton	
2019	Motherless Brooklyn	Tony Vermonte	
2019	The Irishman	Felix “Skinny Razor” DiTullio	
2019	The Jesus Rolls	Petey	
2019	Martha the Monster	Kevin / Doormat (voice)	Short film
2020	Superintelligence	George Churchill	
2021	Tom & Jerry	Spike (voice)	
2021	Thunder Force	William "The King" Stevens	
2021	Jolt	Detective Vicars	
2021	This Is the Night	Frank Larocca	
2021	Sing 2	Jimmy Crystal (voice)	
2022	Seriously Red	Wilson	
2022	Allswell in New York	Gabe	
2022	Blonde	Joe DiMaggio	
2022	Angry Neighbors	Kevin	
2023	Ezra	Max Brandel	Also executive producer
2023	Old Dads	Connor Brody	
2023	Under the Boardwalk	Bobby (voice)	
2024	MaXXXine	Detective Torres	
2024	Incoming	Mr. Studebaker	
2024	Unstoppable	Rich	
2025	Blue Moon	Eddie	
2025	Trap House	DEA Agent Andre Washburn	
2026	One Night Only	Detective Sannogale	
2026	Ray Gunn	Arnold Dom (voice)	
TBA	Judgment Day	TBA	Post-production

=== Television ===
Year	Title	Role	Notes
1998	When Trumpets Fade	Capt. Thomas Zenek	Television film
1999–2001	Third Watch	Roberto Caffey	Main cast; 38 episodes
2000	Sex and the City	Adam Ball	Episode: "Easy Come, Easy Go"
2001–2002	100 Centre Street	Jeremiah Jellinek	5 episodes
2002	Law & Order: Special Victims Unit	Kyle Novacek	Episode: "Monogamy"
2002	Ally McBeal	Wilson Jade	5 episodes
2002	Law & Order	Randy Porter	Episode: "Hitman"
2003	Kingpin	Chato Cadena	Main cast; 6 episodes
2003	Law & Order: Criminal Intent	Julian Bello	Episode: "The Gift"
2003	Oz	Alonzo Torquemada	2 episodes
2004	Six Feet Under	Javier	3 episodes
2004–2006, 2018	Will & Grace	Vince D'Angelo	17 episodes
2005	N.Y.-70	Det. Niko Corso	Pilot
2005	The Exonerated	Jesse Tafero	Television film
2005	Recipe for a Perfect Christmas	Alex Stermadapolous	Television film
2006–2007	The Days of Pets	Burke Zuko	Recurring cast
2007	The War	Corado R. "Babe" Ciarlo (voice)	2 episodes
2007	The Knights of Prosperity	Enrico Cortez	2 episodes
2007	Law & Order	J.P. Lange	Episode: "Murder Book"
2007	M.O.N.Y.	Joe Capanelli	Pilot
2008–2009	Cold Case	Eddie Saccardo	7 episodes
2008	Lipstick Jungle	Chris "Parks" Parker	Episode: "Chapter Seven: Carpe Threesome"
2009	Cupid	Trevor Pierce	Main cast; 7 episodes
2010	American Dad!	Detective Chaz Migliaccio (voice)	Episode: "Cops and Roger"
2010	Louie	Chris	2 episodes
2010	Marry Me	Adam	2 episodes
2010–2011	Blue Bloods	Charles Rosselini	3 episodes
2012	Modern Family	Lewis	Episode: "Send Out the Clowns"
2012	Boardwalk Empire	Gyp Rosetti	11 episodes
2012–2013	Nurse Jackie	Dr. Mike Cruz	12 episodes
2014	Submissions Only	Man with Paper	Episode: "Petit Sweet Ending with N"
2014	Robot Chicken	Various (voice)	Episode: "Super Guitario Center"
2016	Vinyl	Richie Finestra	Main cast; 10 episodes
2017	Master of None	Chef Jeff	4 episodes
2017	Comrade Detective	Petre Bubescu (voice)	Episode: "Two Films for One Ticket"
2017, 2019	Mr. Robot	Irving	9 episodes
2018	Angie Tribeca	Angela "A.J." Giles Jr.	10 episodes
2018, 2020	BoJack Horseman	Vance Waggoner (voice)	2 episodes
2018, 2020	Big Mouth	Gavin the Hormone Monster / Nick's Agent (voice)	3 episodes
2018–2020	Homecoming	Colin Belfast	11 episodes
2019	The Detour	Castro (voice)	Episode: "The Groom"
2019	SpongeBob SquarePants	Tony (voice)	Episode: "Shell Games"
2020	Mrs. America	Tom Snyder	Episode: "Phyllis & Fred & Brenda & Marc"
2021	Nine Perfect Strangers	Tony Hogburn	8 episodes
2022–2023	Human Resources	Gavin Reeves / Guyvin Reeves (voice)	8 episodes
2022	The Last Movie Stars	Elia Kazan (voice)	2 episodes
2022	The Watcher	Dean Brannock	7 episodes
2023	Bupkis	Uncle Tommy	2 episodes
2025	Only Murders in the Building	Nicky Caccimelio	Recurring role
2025	Platonic	Brett Coyote	Episode: "Brett Coyote's Last Stand"
2026	Man on Fire	Paul Rayburn	Episode: "One"
2026–present	Scarpetta	Pete Marino	Main role

=== Theater ===
Year	Title	Role	Theatre	Ref.
1998	The Most Fabulous Story Ever Told	Steve	Williamstown Theatre Festival	
2003	Fucking A	The Mayor	The Public Theater, Off-Broadway	
2005	Hurlyburly	Phil	Acorn Theater, Off-Broadway	
2007	Mauritius	Dennis	Biltmore Theatre, Broadway	
2010	Trust	Morton	Second Stage Theater, Off-Broadway	
2011	The Motherfucker with the Hat	Jackie	Gerald Schoenfeld Theatre, Broadway	
2012	Glengarry Glen Ross	Richard Roma	Gerald Schoenfeld Theatre, Broadway	
2013	The Big Knife	Charlie Castle	American Airlines Theater, Broadway	
2016	White Rabbit Red Rabbit	Performer	Westside Theatre, Off-Broadway	
2017	The Hairy Ape	Robert "Yank" Smith	Park Avenue Armory, Off-Broadway	
2018	The Lifespan of a Fact	John	Studio 54, Broadway	
2020	Medea	Lucas	Harvey Theatre, BAM, Brooklyn	
2023	Here We Are	Leo Brink	The Shed, Off-Broadway	
2025	Art	Marc	Music Box Theatre, Broadway	

== Awards and nominations ==
Organizations	Year	Category	Work	Result	Ref.
Alliance of Women Film Journalists	2013	Best Supporting Actor	Blue Jasmine	Nominated	
Critics' Choice Television Awards	2012	Best Guest Performer in a Comedy Series	Modern Family	Nominated	
Critics' Choice Television Awards	2018	Best Supporting Actor in a Drama Series	Mr. Robot	Nominated	
Drama Desk Awards	2011	Outstanding Actor in a Play	The Motherfucker with the Hat	Won	
Drama Desk Awards	2017	Outstanding Actor in a Play	The Hairy Ape	Nominated	
Gotham Awards	2003	Breakthrough Actor	The Station Agent	Nominated	
Primetime Emmy Awards	2005	Outstanding Guest Actor in a Comedy Series	Will & Grace (season 7)	Won	
Primetime Emmy Awards	2012	Outstanding Guest Actor in a Comedy Series	Nurse Jackie (episode: "Disneyland Sucks")	Nominated	
Primetime Emmy Awards	2013	Outstanding Guest Actor in a Comedy Series	Nurse Jackie (episode: "Walk of Shame")	Nominated	
Primetime Emmy Awards	2013	Outstanding Supporting Actor in a Drama Series	Boardwalk Empire (episode: "Sunday Best")	Won	
Screen Actors Guild Awards	2003	Outstanding Cast in a Motion Picture	The Station Agent	Nominated	
Screen Actors Guild Awards	2012	Outstanding Ensemble in a Comedy Series	Nurse Jackie	Nominated	
Screen Actors Guild Awards	2012	Outstanding Ensemble in a Drama Series	Boardwalk Empire	Nominated	
Screen Actors Guild Awards	2019	Outstanding Cast in a Motion Picture	The Irishman	Nominated	
Tony Awards	2008	Best Featured Actor in a Play	Mauritius	Nominated	
Tony Awards	2011	Best Leading Actor in a Play	The Motherfucker with the Hat	Nominated	
