= Aubade (Larkin) =

Poem by Philip Larkin

"Aubade" is a poem by the English poet Philip Larkin, first published in 1977. The theme of the poem is the terror of death. The title refers to the poetic genre of aubade, poems written about the early morning.

"Aubade" has been described by Frank Wilson of the Philadelphia Inquirer as Larkin's last truly great poem. Larkin described it as an "in-a-funk-about-death" poem.

== References in popular culture ==
In the television show Devs, the first three and a half stanzas of the poem are read by the actor Stephen McKinley Henderson, initially as a voiceover, but later revealed to be his character Stewart speaking it as a warning to Forest.
