= High Windows =

Collection of poems by Philip Larkin

- First edition
- Author: Philip Larkin
- Language: English
- Genre: Poetry
- Published: 1974 (Faber and Faber)
- Publication place: United Kingdom
- ISBN: 0-571-20275-6
- OCLC: 46613746
- Preceded by: The Whitsun Weddings

High Windows is a collection of poems by English poet Philip Larkin. It was published in 1974 by Faber & Faber and was the last publication of new poetry by Larkin before his death in 1985. It was much anticipated. The dust cover flap of the hardback says "No introduction is necessary to this new collection..."

The collection contains some of his most famous poems, including the title piece, "High Windows", "Dublinesque", and "This Be The Verse". The collection contains themes presented in his earlier collections, though the tone of the poems caused critics to suggest the book is darker and more "socially engaged" than his earlier volumes. It is currently on the AQA AS/A2 level English Literature syllabus.

Larkin read the poems from this collection for an LP, released in 1975 by Argo as part of their series British Poets of Our Time.

== Poems ==
The volume contains 24 poems:

| Sequence | Poem title | Completion date |
|---|---|---|
| 1 | To the Sea | Oct 1969 (best known date) |
| 2 | Sympathy in White Major | 31 Aug 1967 |
| 3 | The Trees | 02 Jun 1967 |
| 4 | Livings: I, II, III | 10 Dec 1971 |
| 5 | Forget What Did | 06 Aug 1971 |
| 6 | High Windows | 12 Feb 1967 |
| 7 | Friday Night in the Royal Station Hotel | 20 May 1966 |
| 8 | The Old Fools | 12 Jan 1973 |
| 9 | Going, Going | 25 Jan 1972 |
| 10 | The Card-Players | 6 May 1970 |
| 11 | The Building | 09 Feb 1972 |
| 12 | Posterity | 17 Jun 1968 |
| 13 | Dublinesque | 06 Jun 1970 |
| 14 | Homage to a Government | 10 Jan 1969 |
| 15 | This Be The Verse | Apr 1971 (best known date) |
| 16 | How Distant | 24 Nov 1965 |
| 17 | Sad Steps | 24 Apr 1968 |
| 18 | Solar | 04 Nov 1964 |
| 19 | Annus Mirabilis | 16 Jul 1967 |
| 20 | Vers de Société | 19 May 1971 |
| 21 | Show Saturday | 03 Dec 1973 |
| 22 | Money | 19 Feb 1973 |
| 23 | Cut Grass | 03 Jun 1971 |
| 24 | The Explosion | 05 Jan 1970 |

== Critical reception ==
Clive James, in As of this writing, describes High Windows as Larkin's bleakest volume of poetry, though he does admit that there are aspects of the poetry that contain the humour found in Larkin's earlier books of poetry. James suggests that Larkin has never liked the idea of a poet "Developing" and that Larkin himself remains the same throughout his career as a poet. High Windows, in James's opinion, shows that Larkin simply strives, with the addition of each poem, to state more clearly the same principles shown by his early works and concludes that "The total impression of High Windows is of despair made beautiful."
