= List of Mystery! episodes =

TV show

The following is the list of Mystery! episodes in order by season.

In 1980, Mystery! was launched as the de facto spin-off of Masterpiece Theatre and ran until 2007. For most of its history, the program aired on Thursday nights. Beginning in season 22, the time slot shifted to Wednesday, and then Monday. Finally, in late 2002, Mystery! was moved to Sunday nights and shared the same time slot as Masterpiece Theatre. For the next five years, Mystery! aired as a summer and early fall program, while Masterpiece Theatre aired in the late fall, winter, and spring.

In early 2008, Mystery! and Masterpiece Theatre were reformatted as Masterpiece. Masterpiece is aired as three different series: Masterpiece Classic, Masterpiece Mystery!, and Masterpiece Contemporary.

This lists the titles of the individual miniseries. Some ran for only one episode, many ran for two or more installments. The following lists them according to original season, and then in alphabetical order. Also included are the original UK series and episode numbers for each program, when they differ from the US numbers. For lists of episodes of the successor series, see List of Masterpiece Mystery! episodes.

This list does not include any rebroadcasts of series, including those previously shown on Masterpiece Theatre.

== Episode list ==
=== Season 1 (1980-81) ===
- The Racing Game, Series I
- Rebecca
- Rumpole of the Bailey, Series I (UK Series I: 3-6)
- Sergeant Cribb, Series I (UK Series I:2,3,6)
- She Fell Among Thieves

=== Season 2 (1981-82) ===
- Dr. Jekyll and Mr. Hyde
- Malice Aforethought
- The Racing Game, Series II
- Rumpole of the Bailey, Series II
- Sergeant Cribb, Series II (UK Series I:1,4,5,7,8)

=== Season 3 (1982-83) ===
- Agatha Christie Stories, Series I
- Dying Day
- Father Brown, Series I
- The Limbo Connection
- Melissa
- Miss Morison's Ghosts
- Quiet as a Nun
- Sergeant Cribb, Series III (UK Series II:1,2,4,5,6)
- Sweeney Todd
- We, the Accused

=== Season 4 (1983-84) ===
- Reilly, Ace of Spies, Series I
- Shades of Darkness, Series I

=== Season 5 (1984-85) ===
- The Adventures of Sherlock Holmes, Series I
- Agatha Christie Stories, Series II
- Agatha Christie's Partners in Crime, Series I (UK Series I:2-6)
- Praying Mantis
- Rumpole of the Bailey, Series III
- The Woman in White

=== Season 6 (1985-86) ===
- The Adventures of Sherlock Holmes, Series II
- Agatha Christie's Miss Marple, Series I (UK Series I:1-2)
- Agatha Christie's Partners in Crime, Series II (UK Series I:7-11)
- Charters and Caldicott
- Dalgliesh I: Death of an Expert Witness
- My Cousin Rachel

=== Season 7 (1986-87) ===
- Agatha Christie's Miss Marple, Series II (UK Series I:3-4)
- Agatha Christie's The Secret Adversary
- Brat Farrar
- Dalgliesh II: Shroud for a Nightingale
- Dalgliesh III: Cover Her Face
- The Return of Sherlock Holmes, Series I

=== Season 8 (1987-88) ===
- Agatha Christie's Miss Marple, Series III (UK Series I:6-8)
- Dalgliesh IV: The Black Tower
- Inspector Morse, Series I
- Lord Peter Wimsey, Series I
- Rumpole of the Bailey, Series IV

=== Season 9 (1988-89) ===
- Agatha Christie's Miss Marple, Series IV (UK Series I:5,9)
- Cause Célèbre
- Game, Set and Match
- Inspector Morse, Series II (UK Series II:1,2,4)
- The Return of Sherlock Holmes, Series II

=== Season 10 (1989-1990) ===
- Agatha Christie's Poirot, Series I
- Campion, Series I
- Dalgliesh V: A Taste for Death
- Inspector Morse, Series III (UK Series II:3 and Series III:1-2)
- Rumpole of the Bailey, Series V

=== Season 11 (1990-91) ===
- Agatha Christie's Poirot, Series II (UK Series II:1-7 and Series III:1)
- Campion, Series II
- The Dark Angel
- Die Kinder (The Children)
- Inspector Morse, Series IV (UK Series III:3-4 and Series IV:1)
- The Man from the Pru
- Mother Love

=== Season 12 (1991-92) ===
- Agatha Christie's Poirot, Series III (UK Series II:8-9 and Series III:2-7)
- The Casebook of Sherlock Holmes, Series I
- Dalgliesh VI: Devices and Desires
- The Inspector Alleyn Mysteries: Artists in Crime (UK Pilot)
- Inspector Morse, Series V (UK Series IV:2-4)
- Prime Suspect I

=== Season 13 (1992-93) ===
- Agatha Christie's Poirot, Series IV (UK Series III:8-11 and Series IV:1)
- Inspector Morse, Series VI (UK Series V: 1,2,5)
- Maigret, Series I
- Prime Suspect II
- Rumpole of the Bailey, Series VI
- Sherlock Holmes: The Master Blackmailer

=== Season 14 (1993-94) ===
- Agatha Christie's Poirot, Series V (UK Series IV:2-3 and Series V:1,5,7,8)
- Dalgliesh VII: Unnatural Causes
- The Inspector Alleyn Mysteries, Series I (UK Series I:1-3)
- Inspector Morse, Series VII (UK Series V:3-4 and Series VI:1-2)
- Prime Suspect III
- Sherlock Holmes: The Eligible Bachelor
- Sherlock Holmes: The Last Vampire

=== Season 15 (1994-95) ===
- Agatha Christie's Poirot, Series VI (UK Series V:2-4,6)
- Cadfael, Series I
- A Dark Adapted Eye
- The Inspector Alleyn Mysteries, Series II (UK Series I:4-5)
- Inspector Morse, Series VIII (UK Series VI:3-5)
- Maigret, Series II
- Rumpole of the Bailey, Series VII

=== Season 16 (1995-96) ===
- Agatha Christie's Poirot, Series VII (UK Series VI:2)
- Chandler & Company
- Dalgliesh VIII: A Mind to Murder
- Gallowglass
- Inspector Morse, Series IX (UK Series VII:2-3)
- The Memoirs of Sherlock Holmes, Series I

=== Season 17 (1996-97) ===
- Agatha Christie's Poirot, Series VIII (UK Series VI:1,4)
- Cadfael, Series II
- Dalgliesh IX: Original Sin
- Inspector Morse, Series X (UK Series VII:1 and 1995 Special)
- Oliver's Travels

=== Season 18 (1997-98) ===
- Deep Secrets
- Hetty Wainthropp Investigates, Series I (UK Series I:1,2,4,6)
- Into the Blue
- The Sculptress

=== Season 19 (1998-99) ===
- Cadfael, Series III
- Cadfael, Series IV
- Dalgliesh X: A Certain Justice
- Heat of the Sun, Series I
- Hetty Wainthropp Investigates, Series II (UK Series II:1,4-6)
- Inspector Morse, Series XI (UK 1996 and 1997 Specials)
- The Life and Crimes of William Palmer
- Touching Evil, Series I

=== Season 20 (1999-2000) ===
- Hetty Wainthropp Investigates, Series III (UK Series III:1-6)
- Inspector Morse, Series XII (UK 1998 Special)
- Lady Audley's Secret
- Murder Rooms: The Dark Beginnings of Sherlock Holmes (UK Pilot)
- Second Sight, Series I
- Touching Evil, Series II
- An Unsuitable Job for a Woman

=== Season 21 (2000-01) ===
- Hetty Wainthropp Investigates, Series IV (UK Series III:7-9 and Series IV:1-3)
- The Inspector Morse Finalé: The Remorseful Day (UK 2000 Special)
- The Last Morse: A Documentary
- The Mrs. Bradley Mysteries, (UK Pilot)
- Second Sight, Series II
- Touching Evil, Series III
- Trial by Fire
- The Wyvern Mystery

=== Season 22 (2002) ===
- Forgotten
- The Inspector Lynley Mysteries I: A Great Deliverance (UK Pilot)
- Murder Rooms: The Dark Beginnings of Sherlock Holmes, Series I
- Skinwalkers: An American MYSTERY! Special

=== Season 23 (2003) ===
- Coyote Waits: An American MYSTERY! Special
- Dead Gorgeous
- Hetty Wainthropp Investigates, Series V (UK Series IV:4-6)
- The Inspector Lynley Mysteries, Series II (UK Series I)
- The Mrs. Bradley Mysteries, Series I

=== Season 24 (2004) ===
- Dalgliesh XI: Death in Holy Orders
- Foyle's War, Series II
- The Inspector Lynley Mysteries, Series III (UK Series II)
- A Thief of Time: An American MYSTERY! Special

=== Season 25 (2005) ===
- Agatha Christie's Marple, Series I
- Dalgliesh XII: The Murder Room
- Foyle's War, Series III
- The Inspector Lynley Mysteries, Series IV (UK Series III)
- Malice Aforethought

=== Season 26 (2006) ===
- Agatha Christie's Marple, Series II
- Inspector Lewis (UK Pilot) (July 30)
- The Inspector Lynley Mysteries, Series V (UK Series IV)
- Jericho, Series I

=== Final Season 27 (2007) ===
- Agatha Christie's Marple, Series III
- Foyle's War, Series IV
- Inspector Lynley Mysteries, Series VI (UK Series V)
- Jericho, Series II
