= Neville Teller =

British dramatist and abridger

Neville Teller MBE
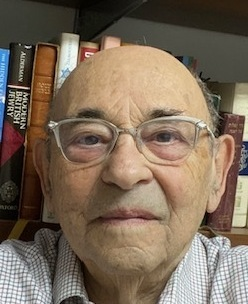
- Born: 1931 (age 94–95); London, England
- Education: St Edmund Hall, Oxford
- Occupations: Dramatist, abridger, writer
- Years active: 1956–present
- Known for: BBC Radio plays and abridgements
- Awards: Member of the Order of the British Empire (2006)
- Website: nevilleteller.co.uk

Neville Teller MBE (born 1931) is a British dramatist and abridger. A prolific contributor to BBC Radio, his first broadcast was a 1956 abridgement of Ethel Lina White's novel The Wheel Spins, which was adapted by Alfred Hitchcock as The Lady Vanishes.

== Early life and education ==
Neville Teller was born in London in 1931. He attended Owen's School in Islington and went on to study modern history at St Edmund Hall, Oxford. He has three sons and now lives in Israel.

== Career ==
Teller began contributing to BBC Radio in the 1950s and became a prolific writer of radio drama and readings. He has written or adapted around 50 radio plays and well over 250 abridged readings for broadcast on BBC radio. Alongside his radio work, Teller pursued a parallel career in the commercial and public sectors: he held positions in marketing, the media, and the civil service while continuing to write for radio. From 1970 to 1991, he was a direct-entry senior civil servant, ending his civil-service career as an assistant secretary in the Department of Health and Social Security. From 1991 to 2001, he worked at Macmillan Cancer Relief, initially as a manager and later as operations director. He was also active in professional organizations related to his field, serving as chairman of the Society of Authors' broadcasting committee and of the Audiobook Publishing Association's contributors committee.

In addition to his broadcasting work, Teller has been a commentator on Middle Eastern politics for over thirty years. His analysis and opinion articles have appeared in publications such as The Jerusalem Post and the online journal Eurasia Review, and he maintained a personal blog called A Mid-East Journal on regional issues. Teller has also authored several books on Middle East affairs, including One Man's Israel (2008), One Year in the History of Israel and Palestine (2011), The Search for Détente: 2012–2014 (2014), The Chaos in the Middle East: 2014–2016 (2016), and Trump and the Holy Land: 2016–2020 (2020). In 2011, he relocated from the UK to Israel, from where he has continued his writing and commentary for publications in both Britain and Israel.

Teller also published two collections of radio dramatizations, Audio Drama - 10 Plays for Radio and Podcast (2019) and Audio Drama 2 - 10 More Plays for Radio and Podcast (2021). He later published Your Pro-Israel Bookshelf: 100 Titles Reviewed, a collection of book reviews written for The Jerusalem Post.

His adaptations of novels by P. D. James include five Adam Dalgliesh mysteries and both novels featuring the private detective Cordelia Gray.

== Awards and recognition ==
In the 2006 Queen's Birthday Honours, Teller was awarded the title of Member of the Order of the British Empire (MBE) for "services to broadcasting and to drama".

== Radio ==
- Adaptations of novels by P. D. James
  - Adam Dalgliesh mysteries
    - Cover Her Face (1993)
    - Devices and Desires (1998)
    - A Certain Justice (2005)
    - A Taste for Death (2008)
    - The Private Patient (2010)
  - Cordelia Gray novels
    - An Unsuitable Job for a Woman
    - The Skull Beneath the Skin

== Books ==
- One Man's Israel (2008)
- One Year in the History of Israel and Palestine (2011)
- The Search for Détente: Israel and Palestine 2012-2014 (2014)
- The Chaos in the Middle East: 2014-2016 (2016)
- Audio Drama - 10 Plays for Radio and Podcast (2019)
- Trump and the Holy Land: 2016-2020 (2020)
- Audio Drama 2 - 10 More Plays for Radio and Podcast (2021)
- Your Pro-Israel Bookshelf: 100 Titles Reviewed
