= Roy Marsden =

English actor (b. 1941)

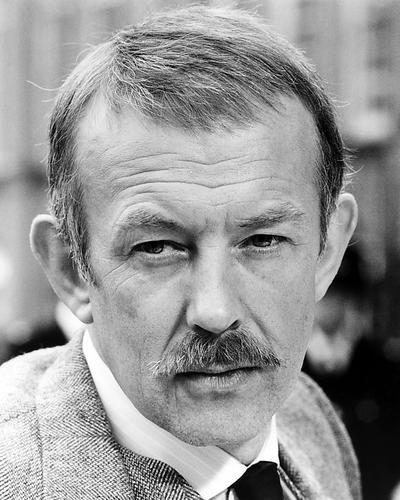
- Roy Marsden as Adam Dalgliesh
- Born: Roy Anthony Mould; 25 June 1941 (age 85); Stepney, London, England
- Occupation: Actor
- Years active: 1964–present
- Spouse(s): First wife (m. 1962; div. 1968); Polly Hemingway (m. 1972; div. 1992)
- Children: 2

Roy Marsden (born Roy Anthony Mould; 25 June 1941) is an English actor who portrayed Adam Dalgliesh in the Anglia Television dramatisations (1983–1998) of P. D. James's detective novels, and Neil Burnside in the spy drama The Sandbaggers (1979–1980).

== Early life and education ==
Marsden was born on 25 June 1941, as Roy Anthony Mould. Marsden attended the Royal Academy of Dramatic Art (RADA) and spent four terms there, and while there, he attempted to unionise the students (but was thwarted).

== Acting career ==
=== Stage ===
In the early 1960s, Marsden worked with the Royal Shakespeare Company and began to accumulate an extensive list of theatrical credits that include everything from Anton Chekhov and Henrik Ibsen to contemporary Soviet playwright Alexander Vampilov. His preference was for the alternative experimental theatres of Glasgow, Edinburgh, Cambridge and Birmingham over London's commercial theatre.

His appearances include Crispen in The Friends, 1970; Casca and Lucilius in Julius Caesar, 1972; Paul Schippel in Schippel, 1974; Heinrich Krey in The Plumber's Progress, 1975. He also played Long John Silver in Treasure Island at London's Mermaid Theatre around Christmas for two years and Henry Higgins in Pygmalion at the Albery Theatre. In 2008, Marsden appeared in two productions, Murder on Air and Happy Jack at the Theatre Royal, Windsor.

=== Television ===
His prominent television roles include George Osborne in a 1967 adaptation of Vanity Fair and the title role of Arthur Chipping in 1984's Goodbye Mr. Chips. Marsden has also appeared in guest roles in episodes of The New Avengers (episode "The Tale of the Big Why"), Space: 1999, Only Fools and Horses (episode "Little Problems"), and Tales of the Unexpected (episode "Proof of Guilt").

Marsden starred in Yorkshire Television's 1978–1980 Cold War espionage series The Sandbaggers. He played Neil Burnside, the dour and fiercely protective director of operations for the Secret Intelligence Service, whose character spent as much time infighting with his superiors in Whitehall and his own department as he did battling the KGB. The show ran for three series and 20 episodes.

In 1982, Yorkshire Television cast him in Airline, a series in which he played Jack Ruskin, a scrappy Second World War pilot trying to start his own post-war airline against establishment opposition. It also starred his wife, Polly Hemingway, who was pregnant with their first child during most of the filming.

Marsden's portrayal of Adam Dalgliesh in Anglia TV's P. D. James series spanned fifteen years. The series began as adaptations played out in serials of five or six one-hour episodes each, which were, unusually for the time, recorded on outside broadcast videotape as opposed to film:

- Death of an Expert Witness (1983);
- Shroud for a Nightingale (1984);
- Cover Her Face (1985);
- The Black Tower (1985);
- A Taste for Death (1988);
- Devices and Desires (1991).

After producer John Rosenberg died in early 1991 (during the transmission run of Devices and Desires), the format of the adaptations changed. Initially, Anglia followed the trend made popular by the Inspector Morse series, condensing the next two adaptations into two-hour filmed TV films.

- Unnatural Causes (1993);
- A Mind to Murder (1995).

The final two adaptations were filmed in three one-hour episodes:

- Original Sin (1997);
- A Certain Justice (1998).

The Dalgliesh role was taken by Martin Shaw when the BBC took over the rights to James's novels and produced its own series.

In 1993, Marsden appeared in The Last Vampyre, a feature-length episode of Sherlock Holmes.

In 2006 he played Ted Cartwright, a veterinarian, in "Bad Blood", in the fourth season of Foyle's War.

Marsden presented a nine-part crime documentary series Roy Marsden's Casebook for ITV West in 2007. He also appeared in the 2007 Doctor Who episode "Smith and Jones" as Mr Stoker, a medical consultant.

In 2008, he appeared in the ITV series The Palace as King Richard's private secretary, Sir Iain Ratalick. That same year he played Sir Charles Marlow in the television film adaptation She Stoops to Conquer; Polly Hemingway appeared in the film as Mrs. Hardcastle, the first time the two formerly married actors had appeared in the same production since 1982's Airline.

Marsden reprised his Only Fools and Horses role in 2009 as one of the Driscoll brothers in the spin-off series, The Green Green Grass. He also appeared in the television film Margaret (2009) as Norman Tebbit.

In 2010 Marsden appeared in an episode of New Tricks, and in 2011 in an episode of Silent Witness.

He played Commander Haydock in the 2016 adaptation of Agatha Christie's N or M?, a three-episode part of the BBC's Partners in Crime serial.

=== Film ===
His film credits include Toomorrow (1970), a small part as a Gestapo officer in The Eagle Has Landed (1976), The Squeeze (1977), and Oberon in Dungeons & Dragons: Wrath of the Dragon God (2005).

== Personal life ==
Roy Marsden was just his subject's stage name, until April 2005 when it also became his legal name (replacing his birth name, Roy Anthony Mould).

Marsden's second wife was actress Polly Hemingway, and they had two sons together before their divorce in 1992.

== Filmography ==
=== Film ===
Year	Title	Role	Notes
1970	Toomorrow	Alpha	
1976	The Eagle Has Landed	Sturmbannführer Toberg, SS	Uncredited
1977	The Squeeze	Barry	
1993	Unnatural Causes	Detective Superintendent Adam Dalgliesh	Television film
1995	A Mind to Murder	Detective Superintendent Adam Dalgliesh	Television film
2004	Salvage	David Foster	Short film
2005	A Higher Agency	Mr. Oliver	Short film
2005	Mysterious Island	Joseph	Television film
2005	Dungeons & Dragons: Wrath of the Dragon God	Oberon	Direct-to-video
2006	All in the Game	George	Television film
2006	Heroes and Villains	Fred	
2008	She Stoops to Conquer	Charles Marlow	Television film
2009	Margaret	Norman Tebbit	Television film
2011	Holy Flying Circus	Mervyn Stockwood	Television film
2013	Game	James	

=== Television ===
Year	Title	Role	Notes
1964	First Night	Matthew	Episode: "The Improbable Mr. Claybill"
1965	No Hiding Place	Gerry Moore	Episode: "Wolves Get Eaten, Too"
1965	Riviera Police	Jack	Episode: "Duet for Two Guns"
1965	The Flying Swan	Tony Hassall	Recurring role; 3 episodes
1965	Danger Man	H.Q. Policeman	Episode: "The Man Who Wouldn't Talk"
1966	The Liars	Charles Ponsonby	Episode: "Series 1, Episode 5"
1966	Theatre 625	Policeman	Episode: "The Queen and Jackson"
1966	The Man in Room 17	Lieutenant David Stanton	Episode: "The Standard"
1966	Mystery and Imagination	Captain Battenburg	Episode: "Carmilla"
1967	The Dick Emery Show		Episode: "Series 6, Episode 5"
1967	The Fellows	Sherratt	Recurring role; 2 episodes
1967	Escape	Gordon Oliver	Episode: "Nothing to Lose"
1967	Vanity Fair	George Osborne	Miniseries; 4 episodes
1968	The Jazz Age	Gervase Kent-Cumberland	Episode: "Winner Take All"
1969	Comedy Playhouse	Nigel	Episode: "The Liver Birds - Pilot"
1969	The Elusive Pimpernel	Sir Andrew Ffoulkes	Miniseries; 9 episodes
1970	Never Mind the Quality, Feel the Width	Mr. Jenkins	Episode: "New Worlds for Old"
1970	Armchair Theatre	Gerry Cartland	Episode: "The Dolly Scene"
1970	The Adventures of Don Quick	Sycamore	Episode: "Paradise Destruct"
1972	Crown Court	Peter MacLennon	Recurring role; 3 episodes
1973	Late Night Theatre	Gavin	Episode: "Family Tree"
1973	Late Night Theatre	Bright	Episode: "The Death of Captain Doughty"
1973	Omnibus	Jake	Episode: "The Runaway"
1974	Z-Cars	Tommy	Episode: "Absence"
1975	The Legend of Robin Hood	Military Prior	Episode: "Part 4"
1976	Space: 1999	Alien Invisible	Episode: "The Rules of Luton"
1976	The New Avengers	Frank Turner	Episode: "The Tale of the Big Why"
1976	Dickens of London	Stanfield	Episode: "Angel"
1977	Space: 1999	Crael	Episode: "Devil's Planet"
1977	Playhouse	Tom	Episode: "Blind Love"
1977	Survivors	The Captain	Episode: "Long Live the King"
1977	Sister Dora	Redfern Davies	Episode: "Part 2"
1977	Target	Mac	Episode: "Hunting Parties"
1977	Drama	Palace attendant	Episode: "Oedipus Tyrannus by Sophocles"
1978	BBC2 Play of the Week	Sidney Frederick Haynes	Episode: "Stargazy on Zummerdown"
1978	Do You Remember?	Frank	Episode: "Park People"
1978-80	The Sandbaggers	Neil Burnside	Series regular; 20 episodes
1979	Playhouse	Reverend Thompson	Episode: "Children of the Gods"
1980	Tales of the Unexpected	Chief Inspector Walters	Episode: "Proof of Guilt"
1982	Airline	Jack Ruskin	Series regular; 9 episodes
1983	Death of an Expert Witness	Adam Dalgliesh	Miniseries; 7 episodes
1984	Goodbye, Mr. Chips	Charles Edward 'Mr. Chips' Chipping	Miniseries; 6 episodes
1984	Shroud for a Nightingale	Adam Dalgliesh	Miniseries; 5 episodes
1984	Tales of the Unexpected	Gerald Overton	Episode: "The Mugger"
1985	Cover Her Face	Adam Dalgliesh	Miniseries; 6 episodes
1985	The Black Tower	Adam Dalgliesh	Miniseries; 6 episodes
1986	Inside Story	John Bennet	Miniseries; 6 episodes
1988	A Taste for Death	Adam Dalgliesh	Miniseries; 6 episodes
1989	Only Fools and Horses	Danny Driscoll	Episode: "Little Problems"
1990	Theatre Night	Agamemnon	Episode: "Iphigenia at Aulis"
1990	The Play on One	David Caesar	Episode: "Yellowbacks"
1991	Devices and Desires	Adam Dalgliesh	Miniseries; 6 episodes
1993	The Case-Book of Sherlock Holmes	John Stockton	Episode: "The Last Vampyre"
1994	Frank Stubbs Promotes	Blick	Recurring role; 3 episodes
1994	Against All Odds	Colonel Mark Cook	Episode: "The Promise"
1995	Dangerous Lady	Boyd-Templeton	Miniseries; 1 episode
1997	Original Sin	Adam Dalgliesh	Miniseries; 3 episodes
1998	A Certain Justice	Adam Dalgliesh	Miniseries; 3 episodes
2004	King Solomon's Mines	Captain Good	Miniseries; 2 episodes
2005	Vincent	Terry O'Connor	Episode: "Series 1, Episode 2"
2005-09	The Green Green Grass	Danny Driscoll	Recurring role; 3 episodes
2006	Foyle's War	Ted Cartwright	Episode: "Bad Blood"
2006	Eleventh Hour	Drake	Episode: "Miracle"
2006	Rebus	Sir Vivian Kirkwood	Episode: "Let It Bleed"
2007	Doctor Who	Mr. Stoker	Episode: "Smith and Jones"
2007	Diamond Geezer	Garovski	Episode: "Old Gold"
2008	The Palace	Sir Iain Ratalick	Series regular; 8 episodes
2008	Trial & Retribution	Ray Harper	Episode: "Tracks: Part 1"
2010	New Tricks	George Mackie	Episode: "Where There's Smoke"
2010	Moving On	Eddie	Episode: "Trust"
2011	Silent Witness	Professor Nigel Silverlake	Episode: "A Guilty Mind"
2013	The Escape Artist	Peter Simkins	Miniseries; 3 episodes
2015	Partners in Crime	Commander Haydock	Miniseries; 3 episodes
