= Dalgliesh (TV series) =

British crime drama series

- Genre: Crime drama
- Created by: Helen Edmundson
- Based on: Adam Dalgliesh by P. D. James
- Starring: Bertie Carvel
- Music by: Andrew Simon McAllister
- Country of origin: United Kingdom
- Original language: English
- No. of series: 3
- No. of episodes: 18

Production
- Executive producers: Helen Edmundson; Elaine Pyke; Willow Grylls; Charlie Pattinson
- Producers: Georgie Fallon; Martin Mahon; Emily Russell
- Production company: New Pictures

Original release
- Network: Acorn TV (USA); Channel 5 (UK)
- Release: 1 November 2021 – present

Dalgliesh (/ˈdælɡliːʃ/;) is a British crime drama television series created and written by Helen Edmundson, based on the Adam Dalgliesh novels by P. D. James. Bertie Carvel stars as the title character, an enigmatic detective–poet. The series premiered on Acorn TV on 1 November 2021 in the United States followed by a Channel 5 premiere on 4 November in the United Kingdom.

A second and a third series premiered in 2023 and 2024 respectively, both adapting 3 novels each.

Dalgliesh has been officially renewed for a fourth series scheduled to premiere in 2027.

== Premise ==
A published poet and recent widower, Detective Chief Inspector, later Commander, in the Metropolitan Police at New Scotland Yard, Adam Dalgliesh employs his empathy and insight to plumb the darker depths of the human psyche while investigating complex crimes in mid-1970s England.

== Cast ==
- Bertie Carvel as DCI, later Commander Adam Dalgliesh
- Jeremy Irvine as DS Charles Masterson (series 1)
- Carlyss Peer as DS, later DCI Kate Miskin
- Alistair Brammer as DS Daniel Tarrant (series 2–3)
- Claire Goose as Dr. Emma Lavenham (series 3)
- David Pearse as Pathologist Miles Kynaston

== Episodes ==
=== Series overview ===
Series	Episodes	Originally released	
Series	Episodes	First released	Last released
1	6	4 November 2021	19 November 2021
2	6	27 April 2023	12 May 2023
3	6	5 December 2024	20 December 2024

=== Series 1 (2021) ===
No. in series	Title	Directed by	Written by	US release date	UK air date	UK viewers (millions)
1–2	"Shroud for a Nightingale"	Jill Robertson	Helen Edmundson	1 November 2021	4 November 2021	4.09
1–2	"Shroud for a Nightingale"	Jill Robertson	Helen Edmundson	1 November 2021	5 November 2021	3.69
Guest cast: Richard Dillane as Stephen Courtney-Briggs, Amanda Root as Sister Brumfett, Fenella Woolgar as Sister Gearing, Natasha Little as Matron Mary Taylor
3–4	"The Black Tower"	Andy & Ryan Tohill	Stephen Greenhorn	8 November 2021	11 November 2021	3.25
3–4	"The Black Tower"	Andy & Ryan Tohill	Stephen Greenhorn	8 November 2021	12 November 2021	<(3.23)
Guest cast: Jonjo O'Neill as Julius Marsh, Mirren Mack as Maggie Hewson, Shannon Murray as Ursula Hollis, Steven Mackintosh as Wilfred Anstey, George Robinson as Henry Carwardine
5–6	"A Taste for Death"	Lisa Clarke	Helen Edmundson	15 November 2021	18 November 2021	3.25
5–6	"A Taste for Death"	Lisa Clarke	Helen Edmundson	15 November 2021	19 November 2021	<(3.23)
Guest cast: Fra Fee as Dominic Swayne, Lily Sacofsky as Barbara Berowne, James Cartwright as Stephen Lampart, Laura Elphinstone as Miss Matlock, Jane Lapotaire as Lady Lavinia Berowne

=== Series 2 (2023) ===
No. in series	Title	Directed by	Written by	US release date	UK air date	UK viewers (millions)
7–8	"Death of an Expert Witness"	Geoffrey Sax	Helen Edmundson	24 April 2023	27 April 2023	3.05
7–8	"Death of an Expert Witness"	Geoffrey Sax	Helen Edmundson	24 April 2023	28 April 2023	2.55
Guest cast: Richard Harrington as Dr David Rollinson, Sam Hoare as Maxim Howarth, Margaret Clunie as Domenica Howarth, Deborah Findlay as Miss Willard, Dominic Rowan as Dr Edmund Lorrimer
9–10	"A Certain Justice"	Andy & Ryan Tohill	Stewart Harcourt and Helen Edmundson	1 May 2023	4 May 2023	2.87
9–10	"A Certain Justice"	Andy & Ryan Tohill	Stewart Harcourt and Helen Edmundson	1 May 2023	5 May 2023	2.79
Guest cast: Michael Maloney as Desmond Ulrick, Michael Culkin as Hubert Langton, Sara Stewart as Venetia Aldridge, Yaseen Aroussi as Garry Ashe, Daisy Waterstone as Octavia Aldridge
11–12	"The Murder Room"	Jon Wright	Helen Edmundson	8 May 2023	11 May 2023	2.55
11–12	"The Murder Room"	Jon Wright	Helen Edmundson	8 May 2023	12 May 2023	<(2.44)
Guest cast: Michelle Duncan as Caroline Dupayne, Nick Dunning as Roger Denholm, Anastasia Hille as Marie Strickland, Sylvestra Le Touzel as Muriel Godby, Sorcha Cusack as Tally Clutton

=== Series 3 (2024) ===
No. in series	Title	Directed by	Written by	US release date	UK air date	UK viewers (millions)
13–14	"Death in Holy Orders"	Geoffrey Sax	Collette Kane & Helen Edmundson	TBA	5 December 2024	N/A
13–14	"Death in Holy Orders"	Geoffrey Sax	Collette Kane & Helen Edmundson	TBA	6 December 2024	N/A
Guest cast: Phoebe Nicholls as Agatha Betterton, Lloyd Owen as George Gregory, Andrew Havill as Archdeacon Crampton, Richard Lintern as Father Sebastian, Anton Lesser as Father John
15–16	"Cover Her Face"	Bertie Carvel	Kam Odedra & Helen Edmundson	TBA	12 December 2024	N/A
15–16	"Cover Her Face"	Bertie Carvel	Kam Odedra & Helen Edmundson	TBA	13 December 2024	N/A
Guest cast: Sam Swainsbury as DI Clive Roscoe, Parth Thakerar as Krishna Mehta, Ellora Torchia as Devi Langridge, Josie Walker as Martha Tate, Soni Razdan as Anita Mehta
17–18	"Devices and Desires"	Roger Goldby	Helen Edmundson	TBA	19 December 2024	N/A
17–18	"Devices and Desires"	Roger Goldby	Helen Edmundson	TBA	20 December 2024	N/A
Guest cast: Adam James as Alex Mayer, Nancy Carroll as Alice Mayer, Liz White as Hilary Roberts

== Production ==
=== Development and casting ===
New Pictures secured the rights to adapt three of James' novels across six episodes with future series outlined. It was announced in October 2020 that Channel 5 and Acorn TV (via Acorn Media Enterprises) had commissioned the series with Bertie Carvel in the titular role and each story having its own cast. A creative team would be behind the series, with Helen Edmundson writing, Jill Robertson directing, Georgie Fallon producing, and Elaine Pyke executive producing.

=== Filming ===
Principal photography for the first series was going to take place in December 2020 but was postponed to 2021. The project received funding from All3Media International and Northern Ireland Screen.

Dalgliesh was officially renewed for a second series in March 2022, and production took place in the summer of that year. A third series was confirmed in July 2022.
