= The Black Tower (James novel) =

1975 Dalgliesh novel by P. D. James

- First edition
- Author: P. D. James
- Language: English
- Series: Adam Dalgliesh #5
- Genre: Crime, mystery
- Publisher: Faber and Faber
- Publication date: 1975
- Publication place: United Kingdom
- Media type: Print (Hardback & Paperback)
- Preceded by: Shroud for a Nightingale
- Followed by: Death of an Expert Witness

The Black Tower is a 1975 detective novel by English writer P.D. James, the fifth book in her Adam Dalgliesh series.

== Plot synopsis ==
Adam Dalgliesh, recovering from suspected leukaemia, is tired of death, and goes to the Toynton Grange care home to see an old friend. But his friend has recently died—apparently of natural causes—and there has been another death in the community, an apparent suicide. Dalgliesh begins to wonder if everything is really just as it seems, and his detective instincts begin to drive him, almost against his will. Two more deaths occur, one a suicide that many people feel is unlikely, the other an unexpected death that requires the coroner to become involved. It is only in the final chapters that Adam Dalgleish figures out the dark secret behind the supposedly innocent care home.

== Reception ==
In a 1975 book review, Newgate Callandar of The New York Times wrote "James is an exceedingly good writer, and her detective, Adam Dalgliesh, is one of the more unusual ones in action today. Nevertheless, 'The Black Tower' is so slow-moving that it will try the patience of most readers — and that has to be the besetting sin of a crime novel."

== Adaptation ==
It was produced for television by Anglia Television (now ITV Anglia) and released in the United Kingdom in 1985 as a drama with Roy Marsden in the role of Dalgliesh. The main filming location was Clavell Tower in Kimmeridge Bay, Swanage, Dorset.

Another adaptation with Bertie Carvel in the title role was part of the 2021 Channel 5 drama Dalgliesh.

== Prizes and awards ==
- 1975 CRA Macallan Silver Dagger for Fiction.
