= Helen Edmundson =

British playwright and screenwriter (born 1964)

- Born: 1964 (age 61–62); Liverpool, England
- Occupations: Playwright, screenwriter, producer

Helen Edmundson FRSL (born 1964) is a British playwright, screenwriter and producer. Her plays and film and television dramas have won critical acclaim and awards including multiple UK Theatre Awards and the 2015 Windham-Campbell Literature Prize for Drama.

Edmundson's plays include Anna Karenina (1992), The Clearing (1993), The Mill on the Floss (1994), Coram Boy (2006), Zorro (2008), The Heresy of Love (2012), Queen Anne (2015) and Small Island (2019).

She has written television dramas including An Inspector Calls (2015), Dalgliesh (2021-present) and Belgravia: The Next Chapter (2024), also executive producing and showrunning the latter two.

== Early life ==
Edmundson was born in Liverpool, in 1964. Most of her childhood was spent on the Wirral and in Chester. Edmundson studied drama at Manchester University. After her studies, Edmundson acted with Red Stockings, a female agit-prop company, for whom she wrote the musical comedy Ladies in the Lift in 1988. This was her first solo attempt at writing for the stage. After leaving Red Stockings, she acted throughout northwest England.

== Theatre ==
=== 1990s ===
Edmundson's first play Flying was produced at the National Theatre Studio in 1990. In 1992, her adaptation of Anna Karenina, produced by Shared Experience, won a Time Out Award and a TMA Award; the production toured nationally and internationally. In 1993, Edmundson's original play The Clearing, which won the John Whiting Award, was staged at the Bush Theatre. In 1994, her adaptation of The Mill on the Floss was also produced by Shared Experience, again touring nationally and internationally; Edmundson won a Time Out Award for The Clearing and The Mill on the Floss. In 1996, Shared Experience staged her adaptation of War and Peace at the National Theatre in a production starring BAFTA Award-winner Anne-Marie Duff; the play was nominated for a Writers' Guild Award for Best Play.

=== 2000s ===
In 2002, Edmundson's play Mother Teresa is Dead was produced at the Royal Court Theatre. In 2004, her adaptation of Gone to Earth was produced by Shared Experience at the Lyric Hammersmith and on tour; it was nominated for a TMA Award. Edmundson's adaptation of Coram Boy premiered at the National Theatre in November 2005, starring Olivier Award-winner Bertie Carvel and Tony Award-nominee Paul Ritter; Edmundson received a Time Out Award and was nominated for an Olivier Award. Coram Boy was named by the Evening Standard as one of the fifty best plays of the century, and became used as a set text in A-Level Drama and Theatre Studies. The play returned for a revival at the same venue a year later, again starring Carvel. Her adaptation of Orestes, toured in the UK and played at the Tricycle Theatre with Shared Experience in 2006.

Coram Boy was revived at the Imperial Theatre on Broadway in 2007, starring Emmy Award-winner Uzo Aduba and Tony Award-nominee Jan Maxwell, receiving six Tony Award nominations. In 2008, Edmundson amended her adaptation of War and Peace, turning it into a two-part play; this production was staged by Shared Experience and Nottingham Playhouse before touring. In the same year, her musical adaptation of Zorro was produced at the Garrick Theatre, starring Olivier Award-winner Lesli Margherita and Olivier Award-nominee Emma Williams; Edmundson was nominated for an Olivier Award for Best New Musical. In 2009, Edmundson's adaptation of Life Is a Dream was produced at the Donmar Warehouse, starring BAFTA Award-winner Dominic West.

=== 2010s ===
In 2010, Edmundson's musical adaptation of Swallows and Amazons was first produced at the Bristol Old Vic, directed by Tony Award-winner Tom Morris. The next year, the show transferred to the Vaudeville Theatre; the play was nominated for an Evening Standard Theatre Award. Edmundson took part in the Bush Theatre's 2011 project Sixty-Six Books, for which artists wrote a piece based upon a book of the King James Bible; Edmundson wrote a piece entitled In the night, a promise, based on Zephaniah. The same year, her adaptation of Coram Boy was revived at the Bristol Old Vic. In 2012, her play about Juana Inés de la Cruz, The Heresy of Love, was produced by the Royal Shakespeare Company at the Swan Theatre in Stratford-upon-Avon. The same year, Edmundson's adaptation of Swallows and Amazons was revived for a national tour. Also in 2012, Edmundson's play Mary Shelley was produced on a nationwide tour, including the Tricycle Theatre and the Liverpool Playhouse, by Shared Experience.

In 2013, her adaptation of Mephisto was produced at the Altonaer Theater in Hamburg. In 2014, Edmundson's adaptation of the novel Thérèse Raquin was produced at the Theatre Royal, Bath, starring Olivier Award-winners Alison Steadman and Desmond Barrit. In 2015, The Heresy of Love was revived for a run at Shakespeare's Globe. Edmundson's adaptation of Thérèse Raquin was produced by Roundabout Theatre Company at Studio 54 on Broadway from 2015 to 2016, starring Academy Award-nominee Keira Knightley and Tony Award-winner Judith Light; the play was nominated for Outstanding New Broadway Play at the 2016 Outer Critics Circle Awards. Simultaneously, the RSC premiered her play Queen Anne in Stratford. In 2017, the RSC produced Queen Anne at the Theatre Royal Haymarket, starring Golden Globe-winner Romola Garai. In 2019, Edmundson's adaptation of Small Island was produced at the National Theatre, directed by its artistic director, Olivier Award-nominee Rufus Norris. The Guardian called the play one of the top two theatre shows of 2019.

=== 2020s ===
In 2022, Edmundson's adaptation of Small Island was revived at the National Theatre. Her new play, Some Woman, premiered at the National Theatre in October 2026, in a production starring Anne-Marie Duff.

== Film and television ==
Edmundson has written two short films for television: One Day, broadcast on BBC Two in July 1991, and Stella for Channel 4. In 2015, she wrote two episodes of ITV drama The Suspicions of Mr Whicher, Beyond the Pale and The Ties that Bind, starring BAFTA Award-winners Paddy Considine and Tim Pigott-Smith. In September of the same year, Edmundson's feature-length adaptation of An Inspector Calls, starring BAFTA Award-winners David Thewlis and Miranda Richardson, was broadcast on BBC One; the programme won the 2016 Broadcasting Press Guild Award for Best Single Drama and was nominated for two 2016 British Academy Television Craft Awards. In 2018, Edmundson wrote the film Mary Magdalene, which was directed by Emmy Award-nominee Garth Davis and starred Academy Award-nominees Rooney Mara and Joaquin Phoenix. She wrote the first two series of crime drama Dalgliesh, executive producing the second. Dalgliesh was first broadcast on Channel 5 and Acorn TV and stars Bertie Carvel as the title character. Edmundson was showrunner, writer and executive producer of Belgravia: The Next Chapter, broadcast in 2024.

== Radio ==
Edmundson has adapted numerous literary classics for BBC Radio 4, including The Voyage Out in 2006, The Mayor of Casterbridge in 2008, Anna of the Five Towns in 2011, and Sense and Sensibility in 2013.

== Awards and honours ==
Edmundson has been a Fellow of the Royal Society of Literature since 2015.

- 1992 Time Out Award for Anna Karenina
- 1992 TMA Award for Anna Karenina
- 1993 John Whiting Award winner for The Clearing
- 1994 TMA Award for The Clearing and The Mill on the Floss
- Nomination: 1996 Writers' Guild Award for Best Play for War and Peace
- Nomination: 2004 TMA Award for Best Touring Production for Gone to Earth
- 2005 Time Out Award for Coram Boy
- Nomination: 2006 Laurence Olivier Award for Best New Play for Coram Boy
- Nomination: 2009 Laurence Olivier Award for Best New Musical for Zorro
- Nomination: 2012 Evening Standard Theatre Awards' Ned Sherrin Award for Best Musical for Swallows and Amazons
- 2015 Windham–Campbell Literature Prize (Drama)
- 2016 Broadcasting Press Guild Award for Best Single Drama for An Inspector Calls

== See also ==
- List of British playwrights since 1950
