= Death in Holy Orders =

2001 Dalgliesh novel by P. D. James

- First edition
- Author: P. D. James
- Language: English
- Series: Adam Dalgliesh, No. 11
- Genre: Crime, mystery
- Publisher: Faber & Faber
- Publication date: 2001
- Publication place: United Kingdom
- Media type: Print (hardback and paperback)
- Pages: 640 (first edition, hardback)
- ISBN: 0-375-43117-9 (first edition, hardback)
- OCLC: 45714861
- Preceded by: A Certain Justice
- Followed by: The Murder Room

Death in Holy Orders is a 2001 detective novel by P.D. James, the eleventh book in the Adam Dalgliesh series.

== Setting ==
The novel is mainly set in and around an Anglo-Catholic theological college, Saint Anselm's, on the windswept coast of East Anglia.

== Plot ==
Dalgliesh visits Saint Anselm's in a semi-official capacity to follow up the death of a student some time previously as the student's father was not satisfied with the verdict. Whilst there, a visiting archdeacon is murdered. Dalgliesh is assigned the investigation, summoning DI Miskin and DI Tarrant from London to assist, as well as local officers. Initial suspicion falls on one of the priests who run the college and teach there, as the archdeacon was known to be recommending the closure of the college and disposal of its art treasures.

Another murder follows and, after all present have been questioned, several secrets become known - including the fact that one of the students is unknowingly the son of one of the lay teachers and that, through his mother, he will inherit the property, should it be closed and sold. Forensic evidence clinches the case against the lecturer and he confesses. The college is closed and the student inherits the proceeds.

In this novel, Dalgliesh meets and begins a relationship with Dr Emma Lavenham, a visiting teacher from the University of Cambridge.

== Critical reception ==
In a 2001 book review for The New York Times, Sarah Ferrell wrote: "Even for P. D. James, the plot is complicated, and purists might complain that its resolution depends on the most Dickensian of coincidences. Most of the rest of us will marvel that a story of such baroque intricacies can be resolved in any way at all, and will be dazzled by the way James keeps all her characters moving with only deliberate collisions." Kirkus Reviews compared the book to A Certain Justice and Original Sin, writing: "... except for an uncharacteristically dewy-eyed portrait of a Cambridge don, each suspect and subplot is handled with all the penetration you'd expect in an apotheosis of the triple-decker whodunit. As in Original Sin (1995) and A Certain Justice (1997), James's achievement is not to pin down individual guilt, but to show the place of crime and guilt and sin in a whole culture."

== Dramatisation ==
The novel was adapted for television in 2003 as a two-part BBC mini-series starring Martin Shaw, which was also released on DVD.

In 2024, Acorn TV released Season 3 of Dalgliesh starring Bertie Carvel as the poet-detective. Carvel's performance has been well received by legacy and online media, with Barbara Ellen describing his Season 3 performance in The Observer (22 December 2024) as "meticulously subtle, dignified and steeped in underlying melancholy".
