= Shroud for a Nightingale =

1971 Dalgliesh novel by P. D. James

- First edition
- Author: P. D. James
- Language: English
- Series: Adam Dalgliesh #4
- Genre: Crime, mystery
- Publisher: Faber and Faber
- Publication date: 1971
- Publication place: United Kingdom
- Media type: Print (Hardback & Paperback)
- Pages: 296
- ISBN: 0-571-09719-7
- Preceded by: Unnatural Causes
- Followed by: The Black Tower

Shroud for a Nightingale is a 1971 detective novel by English writer P. D. James, part of her Adam Dalgliesh series. Chief Superintendent Adam Dalgliesh of Scotland Yard is called in to investigate the death of two student nurses at the hospital nursing school of Nightingale House.

== Plot summary ==
Student nurses Heather Pearce and Josephine Fallon have died of mysterious circumstances in the hospital nursing school of Nightingale House. As Scotland Yard's Chief Superintendent Adam Dalgliesh uncovers sexual secrets and blackmail within the closed community of the hospital, he finds himself in mortal danger.

== Reception ==
In a 1972 book review, Newgate Callandar of The New York Times wrote "James works in the old tradition. She takes all the time in the world to establish her plot, her people and her locale. False clues are liberally seeded. The author goes into the background of the characters. Some are literate in the best British tradition."

== Adaptation ==
The novel was adapted as a television miniseries by Anglia Television and was produced for Britain's ITV network in 1984. It starred Roy Marsden as Adam Dalgliesh, Joss Ackland as the surgeon, Stephen Courtney-Briggs, Sheila Allen as Mary Taylor and Eleanor David as Jo Fallon. Another adaptation in 2021 starred Bertie Carvel as part of the series Dalgliesh. It was produced by New Pictures and released on Acorn TV.
