= A Taste for Death (James novel) =

1986 Dalgliesh novel by P. D. James

- First edition
- Author: P. D. James
- Language: English
- Series: Adam Dalgliesh #7
- Genre: Crime, mystery
- Publisher: Faber and Faber
- Publication date: 1986
- Publication place: United Kingdom
- Media type: Print (Hardback, Paperback)
- Pages: 454 (hardback first edition)
- ISBN: 0-571-13799-7
- OCLC: 15018788
- Dewey Decimal: 823/.914 19
- LC Class: PR6060.A467 T3 1986b
- Preceded by: Death of an Expert Witness
- Followed by: Devices and Desires

A Taste for Death is a 1986 crime novel by the British writer P. D. James, the seventh in the popular Commander Adam Dalgliesh series. The novel won the Silver Dagger in 1986, losing out on the Gold to Ruth Rendell's Live Flesh. The book has been adapted for television and radio.

== Plot summary ==
In the vestry of St Matthew's Church, Paddington, two bodies are discovered with their throats slashed. One is a tramp; the other is Sir Paul Berowne, a baronet and recently resigned government minister. Poet and detective Adam Dalgliesh investigates.

Dalgliesh knew Berowne slightly. Berowne had consulted him about a poison pen letter and an article in the Paternoster Review about two employees of the Berowne family who had died: Theresa Nolan, his mother's nurse who had killed herself after an abortion; and Diana Travers, his domestic servant, who had drowned.

Berowne had recently spent the night in the vestry of St Matthew's, and apparently had had a religious experience, after which he had resigned his government position. He had asked to spend another night in the vestry, after which he was murdered.

Berowne's brother, Major Sir Hugo Berowne, had been killed in Northern Ireland, after which Paul inherited the baronetcy, and married Hugo's fiancée Barbara within five months of a car crash with Paul driving which killed Paul's first wife. Barbara had been having an affair with her cousin Stephen Lampart while engaged to Hugo, which she continued after her marriage to Paul.

Diana Travers had drowned after an evening at the Black Swan, a restaurant. Henry, the doorman at the Black Swan, saw someone that night, soaking wet but walking towards the river. Paul then turned up after midnight at his constituency office with a scratched face.

Paul had lent a copy of a new novel by Millicent Gentle to his cleaner. The novel had been given to Paul on the day of Diana Travers' drowning by the novelist, whom Dalgliesh visits. Gentle says she saw Paul fighting with someone (probably Dominic Swayne, Barbara's brother), after which Paul threw him into the river. As Gentle moved away, she could hear Swayne's companion, Diana, laughing at him, but then the laughter suddenly stopped. Dalgliesh begins to suspect Swayne of letting Diana drown and killing Paul, motivated by hatred after being thrown in the river by Paul. Swayne also hopes to secure his sister's inheritance from Paul. Swayne's false alibi had been provided by Ms Matlock, the Berownes' housekeeper.

Fr Barnes of St Matthew's finds a button in the collection box, which had been put there by the young boy who found the bodies. The police recognise it as from a jacket owned by Dominic Swayne, providing crucial physical evidence linking Swayne to the scene of the crime. Swayne realises it is missing and returns to St Matthew's to retrieve it. He is confronted by Fr Barnes, and shoots him.

Swayne arrives at the flat of Kate Miskin, Dalgliesh's colleague, and takes her hostage. In a struggle for the gun, Kate's grandmother is killed. Swayne is arrested.

== Title ==
The title is drawn from a short poem by A. E. Housman, which is printed at the start of the novel.

== Reception ==
In a 1986 book review for The New York Times, Robert B. Parker wrote the book is "graced by one of the most felicitous prose styles I know. Ms. James is simply a wonderful writer." The Sunday Times called it "A cunningly compulsive work... heart-pounding suspense". In a 1986 piece on James by Julian Symons, he notes A Taste for Death "is the longest, most ambitious and the best of Phyllis James's 10 novels."

== Adaptations ==
A television version of the novel was produced for Britain's ITV network in 1988. It starred Roy Marsden as Adam Dalgliesh and Wendy Hiller as Lady Ursula Berowne.

Another version with Bertie Carvel as Dalgleish was made as part of the 2021 Channel 5 miniseries Dalgleish, in a much shorter adaptation.

The book was adapted by Neville Teller for BBC Radio in 2008, starring Richard Derrington as Dalgliesh.
