= P. D. James =

English crime writer (1920–2014)

The Right Honourable The Baroness James of Holland Park OBE FRSA FRSL
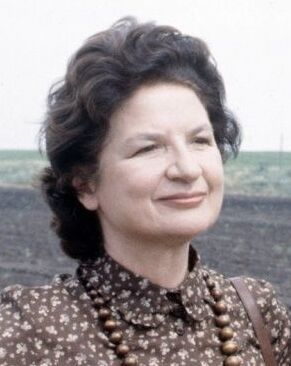
- James in 1984
- Born: Phyllis Dorothy James; 3 August 1920; Oxford, England
- Died: 27 November 2014 (aged 94); Oxford, England
- Occupation: Novelist
- Spouse: Ernest Connor Bantry White (m. 1941; died 1964)
- Children: 2
- Writing career
- Pen name: P. D. James
- Genres: Crime fiction; thriller; dystopian fiction
- PD James's voice from the BBC programme Front Row, 3 June 2013.

Member of the House of Lords
- Lord Temporal
- Life peerage 7 February 1991 – 27 November 2014

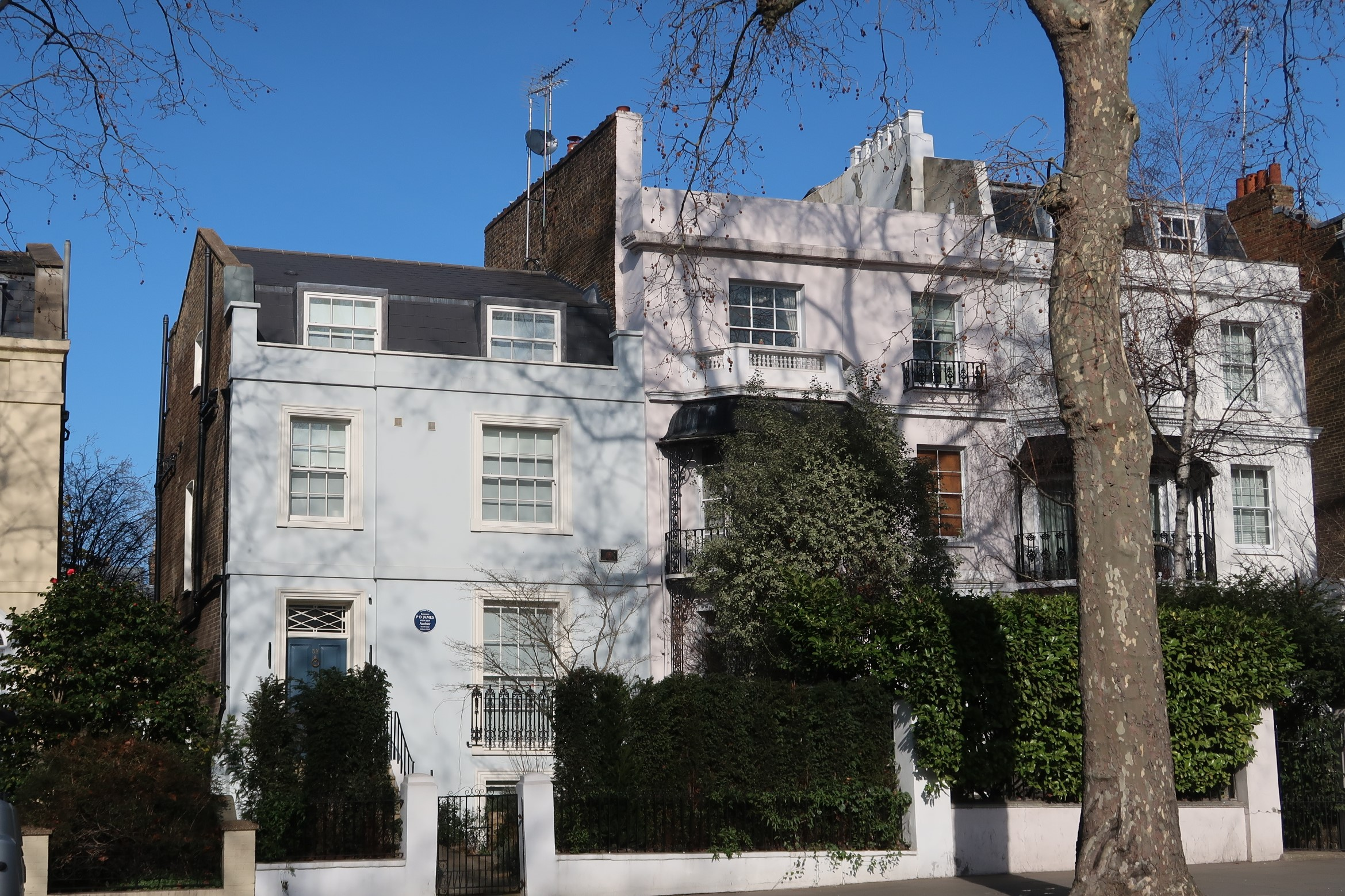
58 Holland Park Avenue, London W11 where PD James lived from 1984 to 2012

Phyllis Dorothy James White, Baroness James of Holland Park (3 August 1920 – 27 November 2014), known professionally as P. D. James, was an English novelist and life peer. Her rise to fame came with her series of detective novels featuring the fictional British police commander and poet, Adam Dalgliesh.

== Life and career ==
James was born in Oxford, the daughter of Sidney Victor James, a tax inspector, and his wife, Dorothy Mary James. She was educated at the British School in Ludlow and Cambridge High School for Girls. Her mother was committed to a mental hospital when James was in her mid-teens.

She had to leave school at the age of sixteen to work to take care of her younger siblings, sister Monica, and brother Edward, because her family did not have much money. She worked in a tax office in Ely for three years and later found a job as an assistant stage manager for the Festival Theatre in Cambridge. She married Ernest Connor Bantry White (called "Connor"), an army doctor, on 8 August 1941. They had two daughters, Clare and Jane.

Connor White returned from the Second World War mentally ill and was institutionalised. With her daughters being mostly cared for by Connor's parents, James studied hospital administration, and from 1949 to 1968 worked for a hospital board in London. She began writing in the mid-1950s, using her maiden name ("My genes are James genes").

Her first novel, Cover Her Face, featuring the investigator and poet Adam Dalgliesh of New Scotland Yard, was published in 1962. Dalgliesh's last name comes from a teacher of English at Cambridge High School and his first name is that of Miss Dalgliesh's father. Many of James's mystery novels take place against the backdrop of UK bureaucracies, such as the criminal justice system and the National Health Service, in which she worked for decades starting in the 1940s. Two years after the publication of Cover Her Face, James's husband died on 5 August 1964. Prior to his death, James had not felt able to change her job: "He [Connor] would periodically discharge himself from hospital, sometimes at very short notice, and I never knew quite what I would have to face when I returned home from the office. It was not a propitious time to look for promotion or for a new job, which would only impose additional strain. But now [after Connor's death] I felt the strong need to look for a change of direction." She applied for the grade of Principal in the Home Civil Service and held positions as a civil servant within several sections of the Home Office, including the criminal section. She worked in government service until her retirement in 1979.

On 7 February 1991, James was created a life peer as Baroness James of Holland Park, of Southwold in the County of Suffolk. She sat in the House of Lords as a Conservative. She was an Anglican and a lay patron of the Prayer Book Society. Her 2001 work, Death in Holy Orders, displays her familiarity with the inner workings of church hierarchy. Her later novels were often set in a community closed in some way, such as a publishing house, barristers' chambers, a theological college, an island or a private clinic. Talking About Detective Fiction was published in 2009. Over her writing career, James also wrote many essays and short stories for periodicals and anthologies, which have yet to be collected. She said in 2011 that The Private Patient would be the final Dalgliesh novel. However, at the time of her death, she had been planning another Dalgliesh novel, set in Southwold.

As guest editor of BBC Radio 4's Today programme in December 2009, James conducted an interview with the Director General of the BBC, Mark Thompson, in which she seemed critical of some of his decisions. Regular Today presenter Evan Davis commented that "She shouldn't be guest editing; she should be permanently presenting the programme." In 2008, she was inducted into the International Crime Writing Hall of Fame at the inaugural ITV3 Crime Thriller Awards.

In August 2014, James was one of 200 public figures who were signatories to a letter to The Guardian opposing Scottish independence in the run-up to September's referendum on that issue.

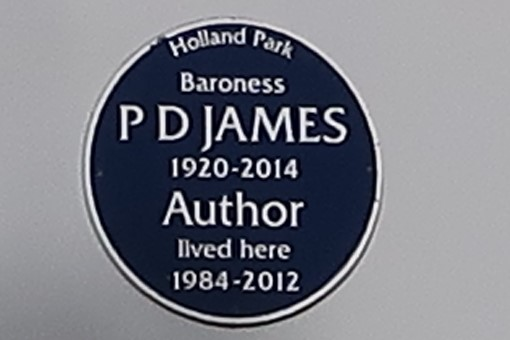
Blue plaque at 58 Holland Park Avenue

James's main home was her house at 58 Holland Park Avenue, in the area from which she took her title; she also owned homes in Oxford and Southwold.

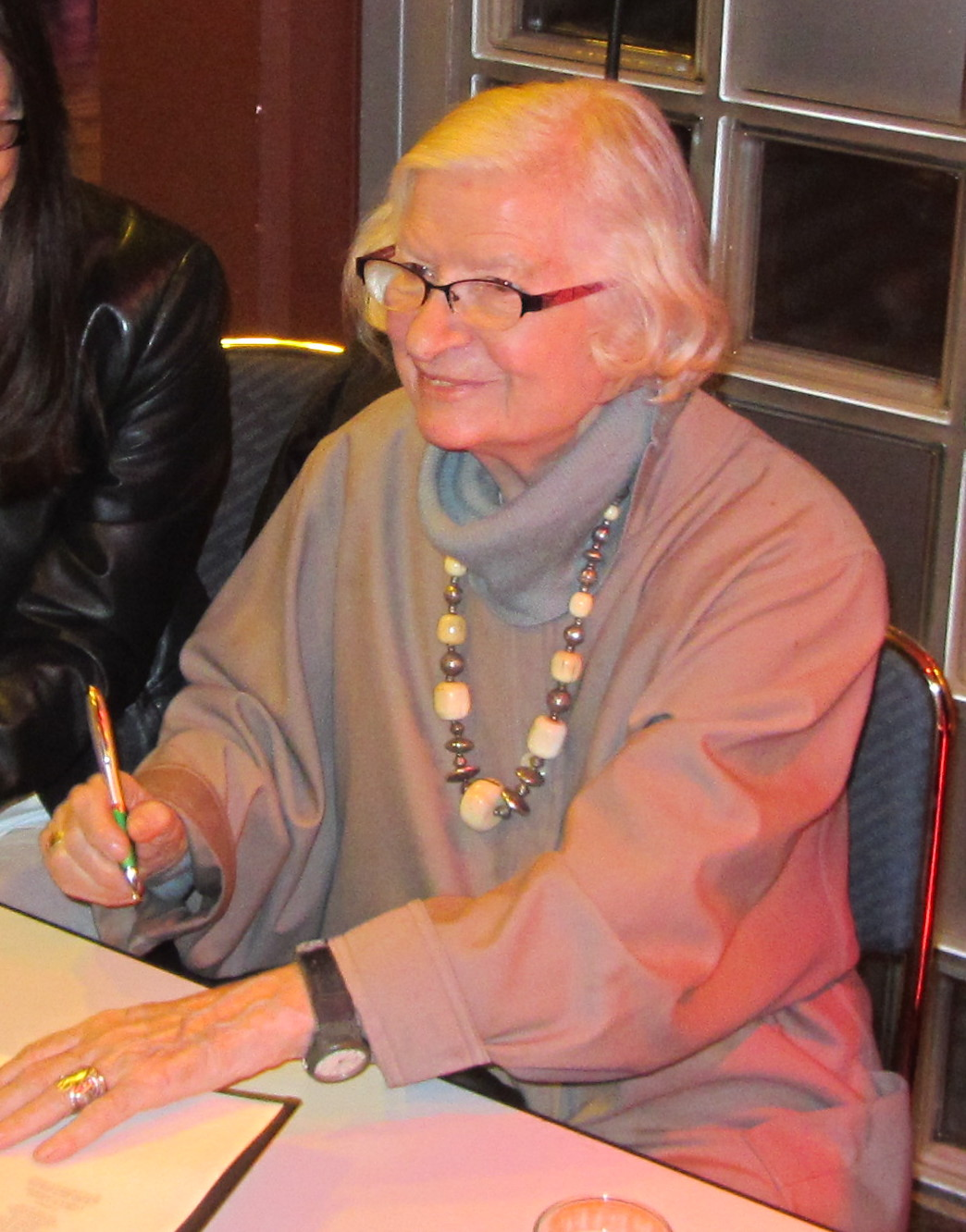
James in 2013

James died from cancer at her home in Oxford on 27 November 2014, aged 94.

== Film and television ==
During the 1980s and 1990s, many of James's mystery novels were adapted for television by Anglia Television for the ITV network in the UK. These productions have been broadcast in other countries, including the US on the PBS network. Roy Marsden played Adam Dalgliesh. According to James in conversation with Bill Link on 3 May 2001 at the Writer's Guild Theatre, Los Angeles, Marsden "is not my idea of Dalgliesh, but I would be very surprised if he were." The BBC adapted Death in Holy Orders in 2003, and The Murder Room in 2004, both as one-off dramas starring Martin Shaw as Dalgliesh. In Dalgliesh (2021), Bertie Carvel starred as the titular, enigmatic detective–poet. Six episodes, shown as three two-parters, premiered on Acorn TV on 1 November 2021 in the United States followed by a Channel 5 premiere on 4 November in the United Kingdom. A further six episodes started to air on Channel 5 in April 2023.

Her novel The Children of Men (1992) was the basis for the feature film Children of Men (2006), directed by Alfonso Cuarón and starring Clive Owen, Julianne Moore and Michael Caine. Despite substantial changes from the book, James was reportedly pleased with the adaptation and proud to be associated with the film.

A three-episode adaptation of her novel Death Comes to Pemberley, written by Juliette Towhidi, was made into the TV series Death Comes to Pemberley by Origin Pictures for BBC One. It was first shown in the UK over three nights from 26 December 2013 as part of the BBC's Christmas schedule and stars Anna Maxwell Martin as Elizabeth, Matthew Rhys as Mr Darcy, Jenna Coleman as Lydia and Matthew Goode as Wickham.

== Books ==
=== Novels ===
Adam Dalgliesh mysteries

1. Cover Her Face (1962)
2. A Mind to Murder (1963)
3. Unnatural Causes (1967)
4. Shroud for a Nightingale (1971)
5. The Black Tower (1975)
6. Death of an Expert Witness (1977)
7. A Taste for Death (1986)
8. Devices and Desires (1989)
9. Original Sin (1994)
10. A Certain Justice (1997)
11. Death in Holy Orders (2001)
12. The Murder Room (2003)
13. The Lighthouse (2005)
14. The Private Patient (2008)

Cordelia Gray mysteries

1. An Unsuitable Job for a Woman (1972)
2. The Skull Beneath the Skin (1982)

Miscellaneous novels

- Innocent Blood (1980)
- The Children of Men (1992)
- Death Comes to Pemberley (2011)

=== Omnibus editions ===
- Crime Times Three (1979), later reprinted as Three Complete Novels (1988), comprising Cover Her Face, A Mind to Murder, and Shroud for a Nightingale
- Murder in Triplicate (1980), later reprinted as In Murderous Company (1988), comprising Unnatural Causes, An Unsuitable Job for a Woman, and The Black Tower
- Omnibus (1982), comprising Unnatural Causes, Shroud for a Nightingale and An Unsuitable Job for a Woman
- Trilogy of Death (1984), comprising Innocent Blood, An Unsuitable Job for a Woman, and The Skull Beneath the Skin
- A Dalgliesh Trilogy (1989), comprising Shroud for a Nightingale, The Black Tower, and Death of an Expert Witness
- A Second Dalgliesh Trilogy (1993), comprising A Mind to Murder, A Taste for Death, and Devices and Desires
- Deadly Pleasures (1996), comprising The Black Tower, Death of an Expert Witness, and The Skull Beneath the Skin
- An Adam Dalgliesh Omnibus (2008), comprising A Taste for Death, Devices and Desires, and Original Sin

=== Nonfiction ===
- The Maul and the Pear Tree: The Ratcliffe Highway Murders, 1811 (1971), with Thomas A. Critchley
- Time to Be in Earnest: A Fragment of Autobiography Faber & Faber, London 1999 ISBN 0-571-20396-5
- Talking About Detective Fiction (2009)

== Short stories ==
- "Moment of Power" (1968), first published in Ellery Queen’s Mystery Magazine, July 1968 (collected as "A Very Commonplace Murder" in The Mistletoe Murder and Other Stories, 2016)
- "The Victim" (1973), first published in Winter's Crimes 5, ed. Virginia Whitaker (collected in Sleep No More: Six Murderous Tales, 2017)
- "Murder, 1986" (1970), first published in Ellery Queen's Masters of Mystery
- "A Very Desirable Residence" (1976), first published in Winter's Crimes 8, ed. Hilary Watson (collected in Sleep No More: Six Murderous Tales, 2017)
- "Great-Aunt Ellie's Flypapers" (1979), first published in Verdict of Thirteen, ed. Julian Symons (collected as "The Boxdale Inheritance" in The Mistletoe Murder and Other Stories, 2016)
- "The Girl Who Loved Graveyards" (1983), first published in Winter's Crimes 15, ed. George Hardinge, later reprinted as "Memories Don't Die", in Redbook, July 1984 (collected in Sleep No More: Six Murderous Tales, 2017)
- "The Murder of Santa Claus" (1984), first published in Great Detectives, ed. D. W. McCullough (collected in Sleep No More: Six Murderous Tales, 2017)
- "The Mistletoe Murder" (1991), first published in The Spectator (collected in The Mistletoe Murder and Other Stories, 2016)
- "The Man Who Was 80" (1992), first published in The Illustrated London News, 1 November 1992, and The Man Who, later revised as "Mr. Maybrick's Birthday" c. 2005 (collected as "Mr. Millcroft's Birthday" in Sleep No More: Six Murderous Tales, 2017)
- "The Part-time Job" (2005), first published in The Detection Collection, ed. Simon Brett
- "Hearing Ghote" (2006), first published in The Verdict of Us All, ed. Peter Lovesey. An earlier version of the story ("The Yo-Yo") written in 1996 was later published in Sleep No More: Six Murderous Tales in 2017.
- "The Twelve Clues of Christmas" (collected in The Mistletoe Murder and Other Stories, 2016)

== TV and film adaptations ==
=== Adam Dalgliesh series ===
- Death of an Expert Witness (1983)
- Shroud for a Nightingale (1984)
- Cover Her Face (1985)
- The Black Tower (1985)
- A Taste For Death (1988)
- Devices and Desires (1991)
- Unnatural Causes (1993)
- A Mind to Murder (1995)
- Original Sin (1997)
- A Certain Justice (1998)
- Death in Holy Orders (2003)
- The Murder Room (2005)
- Dalgliesh (2021)

=== Other adaptations ===
- An Unsuitable Job for a Woman (1982, 1997–1998, 1999–2001)
- Children of Men (feature film) (2006)
- Death Comes to Pemberley (2011)

== Selected awards and honours ==
=== Honours ===
- Officer of the Order of the British Empire, 1983
- Associate Fellow of Downing College, Cambridge, 1986
- Life peerage, Baroness James of Holland Park, of Southwold in the County of Suffolk, 7 February 1991
- Fellow of the Royal Society of Literature
- Fellow of the Royal Society of Arts
- President of the Society of Authors 1997–2013

Honorary doctorates

- University of Buckingham, 1992
- University of Hertfordshire, 1994
- University of Glasgow, 1995
- University of Essex, 1996
- University of Durham, 1998
- University of Portsmouth, 1999
- University of London, 1993

Honorary fellowships

- St Hilda's College, Oxford, 1996
- Girton College, Cambridge, 2000
- Downing College, Cambridge, 2000
- Kellogg College, Oxford
- Lucy Cavendish College, Cambridge, 2012

=== Awards ===
- 1971 Best Novel Award, Mystery Writers of America (runner-up): Shroud for a Nightingale
- 1972 Crime Writers' Association (CWA) Macallan Silver Dagger for Fiction: Shroud for a Nightingale
- 1973 Best Novel Award, Mystery Writers of America (runner-up): An Unsuitable Job for a Woman
- 1976 CWA Macallan Silver Dagger for Fiction: The Black Tower
- 1986 Mystery Writers of America Best Novel Award (runner-up): A Taste for Death
- 1987 CWA Macallan Silver Dagger for Fiction: A Taste for Death
- 1987 CWA Cartier Diamond Dagger (lifetime achievement award)
- 1992 Deo Gloria Award: The Children of Men
- 1992 The Best Translated Crime Fiction of the Year in Japan, Kono Mystery ga Sugoi! 1992: Devices and Desires
- 1999 Grandmaster Award, Mystery Writers of America
- 2002 WH Smith Literary Award (shortlist): Death in Holy Orders
- 2005 British Book Awards Crime Thriller of the Year (shortlist): The Murder Room
- 2010 Best Critical Nonfiction Anthony Award for Talking About Detective Fiction
- 2010 Nick Clarke Award for interview with Director-General of the BBC Mark Thompson whilst guest editor of Today radio programme.

Coat of arms of P. D. James
Escutcheon Vert, between two oak trees eradicated Or a bend sinister wavy Argent, thereon another Azure charged with a quill pen Argent, the quill Or, a chief Azure issuant thereon a representation of Southwold Lighthouse proper. Supporters On either side a tabby cat salient guardant Proper wearing a collar Vert, edged, buckled and studded Or, reposing the exterior paw upon an open book, the pages lettered Proper edged Or and bound Gules each upright on a set of two closed books edged Or, their spines outward, one bound Vert lying on top of the other Azure. Motto Gratus Erga Deum Beatitudine Vitae

== Interviews ==
- Shusha Guppy (Summer 1995). "P. D. James, The Art of Fiction No. 141". The Paris Review. Summer 1995 (135).
- The Guardian, 4-3-01. Accessed 2010-09-15
- "A grisly end", The Sunday Herald, 12 September 2008
- CBC Radio hour-long interview by Eleanor Wachtel, 2000. Accessed 2 Aug. 2020
- The Globe and Mail (Canada), 30-1-09. Accessed 2010-09-15
- The Daily Telegraph newspaper (U.K.), 21-7-10. Accessed 2010-09-15
- The Independent newspaper (U.K.), 29-9-08. Accessed 2010-09-15
- The American Spectator magazine (U.S.), 4-1-10. Accessed 2010-09-15
- Extended audio discussion on Death Comes to Pemberley for the Faber website. Recorded October 2011.
- Video interview discussing Death Comes to Pemberley. Filmed October 2011.
