= The Black Tower (serial) =

- Based on: The Black Tower
- Country of origin: United Kingdom
- Original language: English
- No. of series: 1
- No. of episodes: 6

Production
- Running time: 52 minutes
- Production company: Anglia Television

Original release
- Network: ITV
- Release: 8 November – 13 December 1985

The Black Tower is a 1985 six-part television mystery drama based on the 1975 book The Black Tower by P. D. James.

The title role of Commander Adam Dalgliesh was played by Roy Marsden.
