= Devices and Desires =

1989 Dalgliesh novel by P. D. James

- First edition
- Author: P. D. James
- Language: English
- Series: Adam Dalgliesh #8
- Genre: Crime, mystery
- Publisher: Faber & Faber
- Publication date: 2 October 1989
- Publication place: United Kingdom
- Media type: Print (Hardback & Paperback)
- Pages: 454 (first edition, hardback)
- ISBN: 0-571-14178-1 (first edition, hardback)
- OCLC: 20416380
- Preceded by: A Taste for Death
- Followed by: Original Sin

Devices and Desires is a 1989 detective novel by English writer P. D. James, the eighth book of her Adam Dalgliesh series. It takes place on Larksoken, a fictional isolated headland in Norfolk. The title comes from the service of Morning Prayer in the 1662 Book of Common Prayer: "We have followed too much the devices and desires of our own hearts".

== Plot overview ==
Commander Adam Dalgliesh, having published his second volume of poetry, retreats to the remote Larksoken headland where his recently deceased aunt, Jane Dalgliesh, has left him a converted windmill. However, a psychopathic serial killer, known as the Norfolk Whistler, is on the loose and seems to have arrived at Larksoken when Dalgliesh finds the body of the nearby nuclear power plant's Acting Administrative Officer during an evening stroll on the beach.

== Reception ==
In a 1990 book review for The New York Times, Judith Crist wrote "Her newest mystery, 'Devices and Desires,' is P. D. James at better than her best... She has not failed us, and she has exceeded herself."

However, Kirkus Reviews called it, "though literate and densely thoughtful, perhaps the weakest James of all thus far, especially since sleuth Dalgliesh plays only a small, wishy-washy role".

== Adaptations ==
A television version of the novel was produced for Britain's ITV network in 1991 starring Roy Marsden as Adam Dalgliesh. In 2024 it was adapted again for the television series Dalgliesh starring Bertie Carvel.

It was adapted for BBC Radio in 1997 by Neville Teller.
