= Talking About Detective Fiction =

2009 book by P. D. James

- First UK edition
- Author: P. D. James
- Published: 2009
- Publisher: Bodleian Library (UK); Knopf Doubleday (US)
- Media type: Print
- Pages: 198
- Awards: Anthony Award for Best Critical Non-Fiction (2010)
- ISBN: 978-0-307-59282-8

Talking About Detective Fiction is a book written by P. D. James and published by Knopf Doubleday on 1 December 2009. It won the Anthony Award for Best Critical Non-Fiction in 2010.
