= The Murder Room =

2003 Dalgliesh novel by P. D. James

- First edition
- Author: P. D. James
- Language: English
- Series: Adam Dalgliesh #12
- Genre: Crime, mystery
- Publisher: Faber & Faber
- Publication date: 9 November 2003
- Publication place: United Kingdom
- Media type: Print (Hardback & Paperback)
- ISBN: 0-571-21821-0
- OCLC: 52143680
- Preceded by: Death in Holy Orders
- Followed by: The Lighthouse

The Murder Room is a 2003 detective novel by English writer P. D. James, the twelfth in the Adam Dalgliesh series. It takes place in London, particularly the Dupayne Museum on the edge of Hampstead Heath in the London Borough of Camden.

== Plot ==
The Dupayne Museum is an eclectic collection of English memorabilia from the period between World War I and World War II. The murder room of the title refers to a room displaying relics of murders that occurred during this period. The Dupayne Museum is the property of three siblings, who are in the midst of a family row over whether or not to renew the lease on the building that houses the museum. When Neville Dupayne is killed in a manner mirroring one of the murders displayed in the Murder Room, Commander Dalgliesh is called in to investigate.

Emma Lavenham, a character from Death in Holy Orders, becomes important in this novel as a romance develops between her and Commander Dalgliesh. The novel ends with a love letter from Dalgliesh to Lavenham, in which he asks her to marry him. She accepts his proposal.

== Reception ==
In a 2003 book review for The New York Times, Patricia T. O'Connor called the book "strikingly similar to James's previous mystery, Death in Holy Orders.. But this time something new has been added. Dalgliesh has a serious love interest", and wrote "This is a very busy mystery, full of traffic jams and ringing cellphones—[James] still manages to preserve the element of old-fashioned, hair-raising suspense." Kirkus Reviews wrote: "Despite a plot less ineluctable than her best (Death in Holy Orders, 2001, etc.), James creates another teeming world in which murder is only the symptom of a more pervasive mortality."

== Adaptations ==
The BBC adapted the book for a two-part, three-hour TV production released in 2004, starring Martin Shaw as Dalgliesh and Janie Dee as Lavenham. The production was released on DVD in the U.S. in October 2005.

A further adaptation was aired in 2023 as part of the Dalgliesh series starring Bertie Carvel.
