= Unnatural Causes (detective novel) =

1967 Dalgliesh novel by P. D. James

- First edition (UK)
- Author: P. D. James
- Language: English
- Series: Adam Dalgliesh #3
- Genre: Crime/Mystery novel
- Publisher: Faber and Faber
- Publication date: 1967
- Publication place: United Kingdom
- Media type: Print (Hardback & Paperback)
- Pages: 236 pp
- Preceded by: A Mind to Murder
- Followed by: Shroud for a Nightingale

Unnatural Causes is a detective novel by English crime writer P. D. James. The third to feature Adam Dalgliesh, it was published in the UK by Faber & Faber in 1967 and by Charles Scribner's Sons in the US. A paperback edition followed the same year. An adaptation of the novel was filmed for television in 1993.

== Plot ==
Detective Superintendent Dalgliesh arrives to spend what he hopes will be a quiet few days at his Aunt Jane’s property in the remote maritime Suffolk hamlet of Monksmere. Other property owners there include the widowed detective novelist Maurice Seton, drama critic Oliver Latham, magazine editor Justin Bryce, romantic novelist Celia Calthrop, the retired R. B. Sinclair - whose three distinguished novels had been published thirty years before - as well as the crippled Sylvia Kedge who acts as typist and helps around the house for some of the previously mentioned. Jane Dalgliesh is herself a respected ornithologist and her nephew is author of two well-regarded collections of poetry.

Others soon arrive to disturb the rural peace: Celia Calthrop's niece Elizabeth Marley, who is studying at Cambridge, and Maurice Seton's younger half-brother Digby. Maurice is away in London when the latter arrives but Maurice's boat washes ashore overnight with the novelist's handless body inside. Since the existence of the boat was known only to those living in Monksmere, the murder is made a matter of local investigation under the direction of Detective Inspector Reckless.

Dalgliesh would prefer to stay uninvolved but is drawn in to make enquiries of his own by the conflicting evidence that is uncovered. The literary community spends much of its time harassing and insulting each other. Pages of an unfinished novel by Seton seem to refer to the manner of his death. Seton had been discussing using his money to set up a literary prize, which would have cut out other beneficiaries, including Digby and Celia Calthrop. Ultimately, too, he appears to have died from a long-established heart condition.

After Dalgliesh gets back to Monksmere, he discovers Digby's body in a bird-hide where he has died of poisoning. When a storm breaks out that threatens the cottage in which Sylvia Kedge lives, Dalgliesh arrives there to find she has already attacked Latham, who had come to check on her. Later she attacks both men with her crutches when they all climb out onto the roof. However, she herself falls to her death, but not before Dalgliesh has snatched a bag from around her neck. This contains a tape recording in which Sylvia boasts of having plotted with Digby to kill Seton for the sake of his money.

At the very end Deborah Riscoe, Dalgliesh's romantic interest in previous novels, has grown tired of him making up his mind to propose and writes to say she has accepted a job in America.

== Response ==
At least one critic found Unnatural Causes "something of a letdown…The method of murder as well as its cause is farfetched." Another commentator locates this in the way the author is playing games here with the genre, its vocabulary and the expectations of the detective novel reader. "The patterning of plot, character and narrative is reinforced by a metafictional awareness of the process of narrative construction, and P. D. James exploits this potential to reveal the artifice of fiction through invoking and deconstructing traditional elements of crime fiction."
