= The Lighthouse (James novel) =

2005 Dalgliesh novel by P. D. James

- Cover of the first edition
- Author: P. D. James
- Language: English
- Series: Adam Dalgliesh #13
- Genre: Crime, Mystery
- Publisher: Faber & Faber
- Publication date: 22 November 2005
- Publication place: United Kingdom
- Media type: Print (Hardcover, Paperback)
- Pages: 352 pp (hardcover)
- ISBN: 0-307-26291-X
- OCLC: 60697223
- Dewey Decimal: 823/.914 22
- LC Class: PR6060.A467 L54 2005
- Preceded by: The Murder Room
- Followed by: The Private Patient

The Lighthouse is a 2005 detective novel by English writer P. D. James, the thirteenth book in the Adam Dalgliesh mystery series.

== Plot ==
Adam Dalgliesh is brought in to investigate the mysterious death of a famous writer on a remote and inaccessible island off the Cornish coast.

Combe Island is a discreet retreat operated by a private trust, where the rich and powerful find peace and quiet. Famed novelist Nathan Oliver, who was born on the island and thus is allowed to visit as he wishes, arrives with his daughter, Miranda and his copy-editor, Dennis Tremlett, who, unbeknownst to Oliver, are having an affair. When he discovers them, Oliver reacts with fury and orders them to leave the island the next day. Oliver is discovered hanging from the island's historic lighthouse. Dalgliesh and his team arrive to investigate.

Surfacing from a fever, Dalgliesh has a vision that helps him fit the pieces of the puzzle together. Dalgliesh recovers from his illness, and after the break of the investigation and quarantine, he and his lover Emma both overcome their fears about each other's seeming lack of commitment, and agree to marry.

== Reception ==
In a 2005 book review for The New York Times, Janet Maslin called the book "too rooted in genre conventions to count originality as its strong suit. But it has deviousness to burn, and it also offers other enticements", and wrote "[It] is a better book than its predecessor, 'The Murder Room.' Its format and intent are more appealing and clear. And it is a sturdy installment in a well-honed series, which is a concept that even its characters understand." Kirkus Reviews wrote: "Although the story is briefer than James’s recent double-deckers (The Murder Room, 2003, etc.), readers will still revel in her matchless fullness of characterization."
