= Death of an Expert Witness =

1977 Dalgliesh novel by P. D. James

- First edition
- Author: P. D. James
- Language: English
- Series: Adam Dalgliesh #6
- Genre: Crime, mystery
- Publisher: Faber & Faber
- Publication date: 1977
- Publication place: United Kingdom
- Media type: Print (hardcover, paperback)
- Pages: 368
- ISBN: 0-7432-1962-7
- OCLC: 47161698
- Preceded by: The Black Tower
- Followed by: A Taste for Death

Death of an Expert Witness is a detective novel by English writer P. D. James, the sixth of her Adam Dalgliesh series. It was published in 1977 in the UK by Faber and Faber, and in the US by Charles Scribner's Sons. Set in the Fens, it follows the investigation of the murder of a senior scientist at a police laboratory where his colleagues are too experienced to have left clues.

== Plot ==
At the same time that local police are called to the murder of a girl found strangled in an East Anglian clunch field, Scotland Yard's Adam Dalgliesh has been given a higher profile case involving the death of forensic biologist Dr. Edwin Lorrimer, chief of section at the neighbouring police laboratory of Hoggatt's and the expert witness of the title. The laboratory is situated in a former mansion near the village of Chevisham, on the edge of the fens between Ely and Cambridge.

It is quickly established that only people associated with the laboratory would have had the opportunity to commit the crime, but the nature of their calling means too that they are unlikely to have left clues. On the other hand, there is plenty of motivation, since many on the laboratory staff have reason to hate their colleague. Much of the novel is thereafter taken up with painstaking examination and questioning.

Among the suspects is Dr. Henry Kerrison, whose children Lorrimer had recently thrown out of the waiting hall when they called to meet their father. Divorced and involved in a tug of war for the children's custody, he is moreover having an affair with Domenica Schofield, the half-sister of the Laboratory's director, Maxim Howarth.

Also on the staff is Angela Foley, Lorrimer's cousin. Their grandmother had left money only to Lorrimer and his will had named Angela as his heir. However, on learning of her close relationship with Stella Mawson, the crime novelist with whom she shares a home, Lorrimer had very recently cancelled the will. Eventually it emerges that his real motive for this act of spite was that Stella had once been his wife in an unconsummated marriage and he does not wish her to benefit indirectly from any money of his. Another reason for Lorrimer's embitterment was that he too had been one of Domenica's lovers until she cast him aside for Kerrison.

A third victim of Lorrimer's ill-will is his underling, Cliff Bradley, who is so bullied by his superior that he is terrified and keeps making blunders in his work. Lorrimer wishes to have Bradley dismissed as incompetent but is resisted by the principal document expert, Paul Middlemass, who punches Lorrimer so hard on the nose that his own white lab coat is bloodied.

Still another suspect is Detective Inspector Boyle, the laboratory's security officer, whose wife is pressing him to return to London. He may have been keeping back some of the cannabis samples he was supposed to destroy and discovery of this by the straight-laced Lorrimer would lead to his dismissal from the Police Force.

Just as Dalgliesh and his assistant, Detective-Inspector Massingham, are near to a solution, a second victim is discovered hanged in the Wren chapel adjoining Hoggatt's. This is found by the laboratory's clerical officer, Brenda Pridmore, who had also found Lorrimer's body in his laboratory four days before. The body in the chapel is that of Stella Mawson, who has made Angela Foley her legatee.

By this time, and by a process of elimination and looking for secondary clues, Dalgliesh has come to the conclusion that the murderer in both cases was Kerrison, who eventually confesses. His motive had been to prevent the jealous Lorrimer from contacting his wife and telling her of Kerrison's affair with Domenica, and by this means giving her ammunition for her custody battle over the children. Stella also had worked out who the murderer was and had arranged a meeting with Kerrison in the chapel to offer him her support, but Kerrison had felt he could not trust her and murdered her too.

== Response ==
Reviewing the novel's first appearance, John Leonard of The New York Times commented that "James does for a forensic science laboratory in East Anglia what Sayers did for Oxbridge and Marsh managed for the London theater world. She fairly wallows in motives, technicalities, eccentricities, venom and defeat." But in an update of A Catalogue of Crime (1989) its editors demurred, finding that, "despite praise by Julian Symons and others, there is less to admire in this book than in most others by this talented author. For some reason the mixture of love and lust that brings about the death of a highly disagreeable pathologist fails to attract or convince."

== Adaptation ==
A seven-part television version was produced for Britain's ITV network in 1983. This concentrates on the main murder, noting only that the death of the girl in the clunch pit had been investigated by Dalgliesh "a few months previously".

A two-hour adaptation (split into two 1-hour segments) was co-commissioned by Channel 5 as the first episode of the second series of Dalgliesh, with Bertie Carvel in the title role. It was first broadcast in the UK in April 2023.
