= The Private Patient =

2008 Dalgliesh novel by P. D. James

- First edition
- Author: P. D. James
- Language: English
- Series: Adam Dalgliesh #14
- Genre: Crime, Mystery
- Publisher: Faber & Faber
- Publication date: August 2008
- Publication place: United Kingdom
- Media type: Print (Hardcover)
- Pages: 395 (hardcover)
- ISBN: 978-0-571-24244-3
- OCLC: 230989862
- Preceded by: The Lighthouse

The Private Patient is a 2008 crime novel by English author P. D. James, the fourteenth and last in her Adam Dalgliesh series.

== Synopsis ==
In Dorset, the once magnificent Cheverell Manor has been renovated and transformed into a plastic surgery clinic, run by the cosmetic practitioner George Chandler-Powell. Two days after Rhoda Gradwyn, an investigative journalist, arrives in the hope of having her almost lifelong facial scar removed, she's murdered and Chandler-Powell finds his surgery under scrutiny from Dalgliesh and his team, who are soon caught in a race against time when another body shows up.

== Reception ==
In a 2008 book review for The New York Times, Janet Maslin called the book an "exercise in impeccable detection", and wrote "James sets her mystery on comfortably familiar terrain and makes the most of its atmospherics. But the plotting of 'The Private Patient' is not up to this author’s diabolical best." Kirkus Reviews summarized it as "Middling work for the peerless James, a whodunit as deeply shadowed by mortality as all Dalgliesh’s cases ever since 'Shroud for a Nightingale'" Donna Rifkind of The Washington Post wrote, "[It's] not the most formidable example of this iconic author's work, but it's still pretty darn good."
