= Adam Dalgliesh =

Fictional character in mystery novels by P. D. James

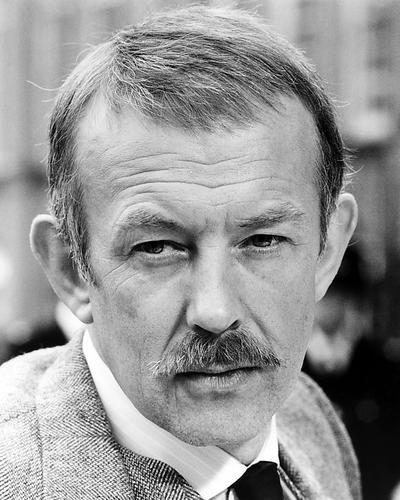
- Roy Marsden as Adam Dalgliesh
- First appearance: Cover Her Face
- Last appearance: The Private Patient
- Created by: P.D. James
- Portrayed by: Roy Marsden (ITV television); Martin Shaw (BBC television); Robin Ellis (BBC Radio); Philip Franks (BBC Radio); Richard Derrington (BBC Radio); Bertie Carvel (Channel 5 / Acorn TV)

In-universe information
- Gender: Male
- Occupation: Police detective, Poet
- Family: Jane Dalgliesh (aunt; deceased)
- Spouses: Mrs Dalgliesh (deceased); Emma Lavenham
- Children: One (deceased)
- Nationality: British

Adam Dalgliesh (/ˈdælɡliːʃ/ DAL-gleesh) is a fictional character who is the protagonist of fourteen mystery novels by P. D. James, the first being James's 1962 novel Cover Her Face. He also appears in the two novels featuring James's other detective, Cordelia Gray.

== Character ==
In the first novel, Dalgliesh is a Detective Chief Inspector. He eventually reaches the rank of Commander in the Metropolitan Police at New Scotland Yard, London. He is an intensely cerebral and private person. He writes poetry, a fact of which his colleagues are fond of reminding him. Several volumes of his poetry have been published. Dalgliesh lives in a flat above the Thames at Queenhithe in the City of London. In the earlier novels he drives a Cooper Bristol, later a Jaguar. He was described as being "tall, dark and handsome" by some women, alluding to Mr. Darcy from Jane Austen's Pride and Prejudice.

His father was the rector of a Norfolk country parish. His sole family relation was his aunt, Jane Dalgliesh, whom he held in high esteem. After her death, Dalgliesh inherits, among other bequests, a converted windmill located on the Norfolk coast. In his lengthy career, he has been known to be quite astute and successful and now heads a squad of CID officers working on sensitive cases.

Dalgliesh is a widower. He lost his wife in childbirth 13 years before A Mind to Murder, and was reluctant to commit himself ever since. His relationship with Deborah Riscoe ended because of this. During his time at St. Anselm's in Suffolk (Death in Holy Orders), he meets Cambridge lecturer Emma Lavenham and later asks her to marry him. The wedding takes place at the end of The Private Patient, published in 2008.

The character's name was chosen in honour of the author's English teacher at Cambridge High School. Years later, she learnt that Miss Dalgliesh's father had in fact been named Adam.

== Bibliography ==
=== Novels ===
Novel	Published	Rank	Car	Partners	Order of TV Adaptation	Order of Radio Adaptation	Order of TV Adaptation (2021-2024)
Cover Her Face	1962	Detective Chief Inspector		Detective Sergeant George Martin	Third TV Adaptation (Anglia, 1985)	First Radio Adaptation (BBC, 1993)	Eighth TV Adaptation (Acorn, 2024)
A Mind to Murder	1963	Detective Superintendent	Cooper Bristol	Detective Sergeant George Martin	Eighth TV Adaptation (Anglia, 1995)	NA	
Unnatural Causes	1967	Detective Superintendent	Cooper Bristol	Detective Inspector Reckless of the Suffolk County CID; Sergeant Courtney of the Suffolk County CID	Seventh TV Adaptation (Anglia, 1993)	NA	
Shroud for a Nightingale	1971	Detective Chief Superintendent		Detective Sergeant Charles Masterson	Second TV Adaptation (Anglia, 1984)	NA	First TV Adaptation (Acorn, 2021)
The Black Tower	1975	Commander	Cooper Bristol, Jensen Healey	Detective Inspector Daniel; Detective Sergeant Varney	Fourth TV Adaptation (Anglia, 1985)	NA	Second TV Adaptation (Acorn, 2021)
Death of an Expert Witness	1977	Commander		Detective Inspector the Honourable John Massingham	First TV Adaptation (Anglia, 1983)	NA	Fourth TV Adaptation (Acorn, 2023)
A Taste for Death	1986	Commander	Jaguar XJS	Chief Inspector John Massingham; Inspector Kate Miskin	Fifth TV Adaptation (Anglia, 1988)	Fourth Radio Adaptation (BBC, 2008)	Third TV Adaptation (Acorn, 2021)
Devices and Desires	1989	Commander	Jaguar	Detective Chief Inspector Terry Rickards of the Norfolk CID	Sixth TV Adaptation (Anglia, 1991)	Second Radio Adaptation (BBC, 1998)	Ninth TV Adaptation (Acorn, 2024)
Original Sin	1994	Commander	Jaguar	Detective Inspector Kate Miskin; Detective Inspector Daniel Aaron; Detective Sergeant Robbins	Ninth TV Adaptation (Anglia, 1997)	NA	
A Certain Justice	1997	Commander	Jaguar	Detective Inspector Kate Miskin; Detective Inspector Piers Tarrant; Detective Sergeant Robbins	Tenth TV Adaptation (Anglia, 1998)	Third Radio Adaptation (BBC, 2005)	Fifth TV Adaptation (Acorn, 2023)
Death in Holy Orders	2001	Commander	Jaguar	Detective Inspector Kate Miskin; Detective Inspector Piers Tarrant; Detective Sergeant Robbins	Eleventh TV Adaptation (BBC, 2003)	NA	Seventh TV Adaptation (Acorn, 2024)
The Murder Room	2003	Commander		Detective Inspector Kate Miskin; Detective Inspector Piers Tarrant; Detective Sergeant Francis Benton-Smith	Twelfth TV Adaptation (BBC, 2005)	NA	Sixth TV Adaptation (Acorn, 2023)
The Lighthouse	2005	Commander		Detective Inspector Kate Miskin; Detective Sergeant Francis Benton-Smith	NA	NA	
The Private Patient	2008	Commander	Jaguar	Detective Inspector Kate Miskin; Detective Sergeant Francis Benton-Smith	NA	Fifth Radio Adaptation (BBC, 2010)	

=== Short stories ===
- "The Boxdale Inheritance"
- "The 12 Clues of Christmas"

=== Related novels ===
Cordelia Gray mysteries:

1. An Unsuitable Job for a Woman (1972)
2. The Skull Beneath the Skin (1982)

== Related characters ==
=== Partners ===
Detective Sergeant Martin is Dalgliesh's partner in Cover Her Face and A Mind to Murder. In Shroud for a Nightingale he partners with Detective Sergeant Masterson. Dalgliesh's first permanent partner was the moody and arrogant Detective Chief Inspector Massingham. Detective Inspector Kate Miskin serves with Dalgliesh and Massingham in Scotland Yard's Special Investigation Squad. In The Lighthouse, Miskin takes over running the investigation when Dalgliesh contracts SARS. She is still a member of Dalgliesh's team at the conclusion of The Private Patient (2008).

DI Daniel Aaron replaces Massingham when Massingham leaves Dalgliesh's squad. Aaron leaves the squad after the events of Original Sin; DI Piers Tarrant is his replacement. When Tarrant is then transferred to Special Branch, squad member DS Francis Benton-Smith (introduced in The Murder Room) replaces him as a viewpoint character. Benton-Smith, the ambitious and good-looking son of English and Indian parents, is at first resented by Kate Miskin, but they develop a good working relationship. Meanwhile, Miskin has a romantic relationship with Piers Tarrant after he leaves the Squad, and they reunite at the end of The Private Patient.

=== Relatives, friends, and romances ===
Jane Dalgliesh is Adam Dalgiesh's aunt and his sole living relative until her death prior to Devices and Desires. Introduced in Unnatural Causes, she is described as a very private and cerebral person, not unlike Dalgliesh himself. She is fond of bird watching and possesses a cottage in Suffolk which she later sells and buys a converted windmill in Norfolk, which Dalgliesh inherits upon her death.

Conrad Ackroyd is one of Dalgliesh's personal friends. He is a member of the Cadaver Club, a private club of crime enthusiasts featured in Unnatural Causes as well as other novels. He is editor and publisher of The Paternoster Review. Ackroyd's connections in the London establishment are often an asset to Dalgliesh.

Deborah Riscoe is one of Dalgliesh's romantic interests; they first meet when a murder shakes Riscoe's home in Cover Her Face; their relationship develops over the course of A Mind to Murder. However, because of Dalgliesh's reluctance to commit, Riscoe ends their relationship via a letter at the conclusion of Unnatural Causes, accepting a transfer to the United States of America.

Emma Lavenham is a lecturer in literature at Cambridge University. She and Dalgleish meet in Death in Holy Orders, develop a relationship during The Murder Room, and, following Dalgliesh's convalescence from SARS on Combe Island (in The Lighthouse), decide to marry, which they do at the end of The Private Patient.

Dalgliesh make a appearances in the first Cordelia Gray novel, An Unsuitable Job for a Woman, and is mentioned in her second, The Skull Beneath the Skin. Cordelia Gray is a private detective and runs a detective agency in Kingsly Street. Dalgliesh is asked to look into the death of Sir Ronald Callender in Cambridge and acquits Gray of any charges. Gray and Dalgliesh stayed in contact, as evidenced by the congratulations card Dalgliesh receives from Gray while convalescing after a successful operation at the beginning of The Black Tower. Gossiping Conrad Ackroyd also remarks on Dalgliesh's being seen dining out with Cordelia in A Taste for Death.

== Adaptations ==
=== Television ===
All of James's novels featuring Adam Dalgliesh up to and including The Murder Room have been adapted for television, beginning with Death of an Expert Witness in 1983. The first ten novels (in the order shown below) were adapted by Anglia Television for transmission on the ITV network and starred Roy Marsden as Dalgliesh. The BBC took over the series in 2003, and Martin Shaw played the role in Death in Holy Orders and The Murder Room. The television adaptations have not always been faithful to the novel they dramatise, partly because they were made and screened out of chronological order.

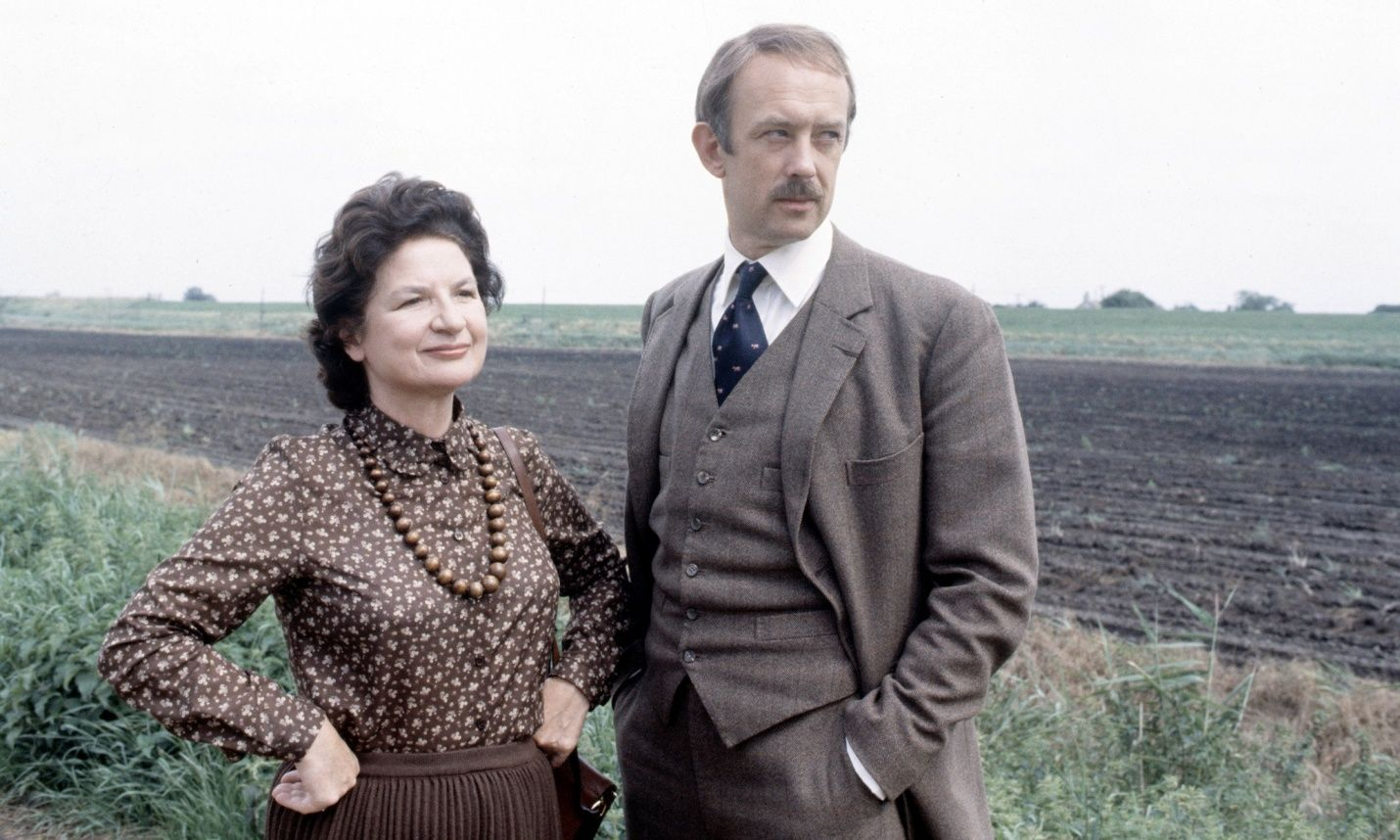
P. D. James and Roy Marsden during filming of the Adam Dalgliesh series in autumn 1984

ITV Adaptations starring Roy Marsden

- Death of an Expert Witness (1983): Dalgliesh, assisted by Massingham (played by John Vine), leads the hunt for an elusive strangler in The Fens.
- Shroud for a Nightingale (1984): Dalgliesh and Massingham (Vine) become entangled in a deadly murder hunt inside a training home for nurses.
- Cover Her Face (1985): Dalgliesh and Massingham (Vine) follow a young girl and a trail of death to a beautiful country home. Features Mel Martin as Deborah Riscoe.
- The Black Tower (1985): Mysterious deaths at a rest home and a reckless move in the drugs trade turn into a dice with death for Dalgliesh and Inspector Rouse (David Webb).
- A Taste for Death (1988): Dalgliesh sets up the Sensitive Crimes Squad and faces an immediate challenge. Featuring Penny Downie as Inspector Kate Miskin.
- Devices and Desires (1991): Holidaying in Norfolk, Dalgliesh is caught up in a series of murders when he discovers a body. Featuring Tony Haygarth as Chief Inspector Terry Rickards.
- Unnatural Causes (1993): Dalgliesh and Inspector Gerry Reckless (Kenneth Colley) are drawn into a macabre murder case during investigations into a currency scam.
- A Mind to Murder (1995): Dalgliesh, assisted by Detective Chief Inspector John Martin (Robert Pugh), is called in following the grotesque murder of a middle-aged woman.
- Original Sin (1997): Dalgliesh discovers a body whilst investigating a series of alarming hate mail attacks on a poet. Featuring Lizzy McInnerny and Tim Dutton as his assistants Kate Miskin and Daniel Aron.
- A Certain Justice (1998): Dalgliesh and Kate Miskin (Sarah Winman) become involved in the death of criminal barrister Venetia Aldridge.

BBC adaptations starring Martin Shaw

- Death in Holy Orders (2003): Dalgliesh and Kate Miskin (Victoria Scarborough) investigate an apparent suicide at Saint Anselm's seminary, which is run by Dalgliesh's old friend, Father Martin Petrie; the coincidence of another death leads to a murder investigation; Dalgliesh meets Emma Lavenham (Janie Dee) and they subsequently begin a relationship.
- The Murder Room (2005): At the beginning Dalgliesh investigates the murder in the grounds of the Dupayne Museum, of Neville Dupayne; at the end of a mad dash to the railway station, he proposes to Emma Lavenham. Features Tilly Blackwood and William Beck as DI Kate Miskin and DI Piers Tarrant.

Channel 5/Acorn TV adaptation starring Bertie Carvel

A series Dalgliesh starring Bertie Carvel premiered on Acorn TV and Channel 5 in November 2021. It follows Dalgliesh from the 1970s to the present. A second series began airing on Channel 5 in April 2023.

- Series 1, Episodes 1 & 2: Shroud for a Nightingale: In January 1975, a student nurse dies during a training demonstration and Dalgliesh (Carvel) is sent to investigate, accompanied by his partner DS Charles Masterson (Jeremy Irvine).
- Series 1, Episodes 3 & 4: The Black Tower: Dalgliesh travels to Dorset to visit his friend Father Michael, but it turns out the man died two weeks earlier. To make things worse, Dalgliesh learns that another resident of the estate died a suspicious death a few weeks before that. Features Carlyss Peer as Kate Miskin.
- Series 1, Episodes 5 & 6: A Taste for Death: Two dead bodies are discovered in a church - one is a former Member of Parliament, while the other is a local vagrant. The investigation leads Dalgliesh, DS Masterson and DS Miskin into the world of the British nobility, where everyone seems to have secrets.
- Series 2, Episodes 1 & 2: Death of an Expert Witness: Dalgliesh and Miskin investigate the death of scientist Doctor Edmund Lorrimer at Hoggatt's Forensic Laboratory. Dalgliesh soon learns that the late Doctor was not a popular figure.
- Series 2, Episodes 3 & 4: A Certain Justice: Dalgliesh investigates the murder of defence barrister Venetia Aldridge. Could a client for whom she recently secured an acquittal be involved in her death?
- Series 2, Episodes 5 & 6: The Murder Room: A young doctor is set on fire in the grounds of his family museum. Everyone who works there comes under suspicion - including his own siblings.
- Series 3, Episodes 1 & 2: Death in Holy Orders.
- Series 3, Episodes 3 & 4: Cover Her Face.
- Series 3, Episodes 5 & 6: Devices and Desires.

=== BBC Radio ===
Five of the Dalgliesh novels have been dramatised by Neville Teller for BBC Radio 4. Robin Ellis played Dalgliesh in Cover Her Face (1993; miscredited as Robert Ellis by the BBC announcer) and Devices and Desires (1998). Phillip Franks played the role in A Certain Justice (2005). Dalgliesh was then played by Richard Derrington in A Taste for Death (2008) and The Private Patient (2010).
