= Unnatural Causes (1993 film) =

- Country of origin: United Kingdom
- Original language: English

Production
- Running time: 103 minutes

Original release
- Release: 1993

Unnatural Causes is a 1993 television film adaptation of the 1967 detective novel of the same name by P. D. James written by Peter Buckman. Differing in several details from the original plot, it stars Roy Marsden as Commander Adam Dalgliesh and is part of the Dalgleish series of television films.
