= Martin Shaw =

English actor (born 1945)

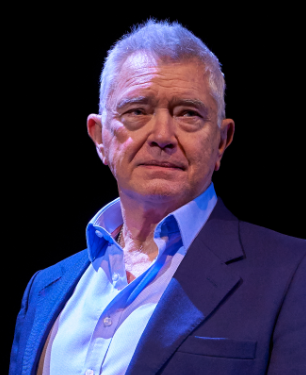
- Shaw in 2020
- Born: 21 January 1945 (age 81); Birmingham, Warwickshire, (Note: Before 1 April 1974, Birmingham was in Warwickshire) England
- Education: London Academy of Music and Dramatic Art
- Occupation: Actor
- Years active: 1967–present
- Spouse(s): Jill Allen (m. 1968, divorced) Maggie Mansfield (m. 1985, divorced) Vicky Kimm (m. 1996, divorced)
- Partner: Karen Da Silva (2003–present)
- Children: 3 including Joe Shaw
- Awards: Drama Desk Award; Theatre World Special Award

Martin Shaw (born 21 January 1945) is an English actor. He came to national recognition in the role of Ray Doyle in the ITV crime-action television drama series The Professionals (1977–1983). Further notable television parts include the title roles in The Chief (1993–1995), Judge John Deed (2001–2007) and Inspector George Gently (2007–2017). He has also acted on stage and in film, and has narrated many audiobooks and presented various television series.

== Life and career ==
=== Early years ===
Shaw was born in Birmingham. His childhood was spent in Alleyne Grove in Erdington and Sutton Coldfield. Shaw attended Great Barr School, where he excelled in English literature and drama lessons. At sixteen, he was offered a scholarship to a Birmingham drama school but declined.

In his youth, Shaw was involved in a drunken brawl with a friend, suffering broken teeth, injuries to his face and a fractured skull, and needed cheekbone surgery.

At age eighteen, Shaw moved to London to study acting at the London Academy of Music and Dramatic Art (LAMDA) from which he graduated. He served his apprenticeship in repertory as an assistant stage manager at the Queen's Theatre, Hornchurch and the Bristol Old Vic.

=== Stage ===
Shaw took key roles in the first revival of Look Back in Anger (Royal Court/Criterion, 1968); in the National Theatre's Saturday, Sunday, Monday opposite Laurence Olivier (1973); and in A Streetcar Named Desire presented by the Piccadilly Theatre in 1974. He later acknowledged the role of Stanley Kowalski in 'Streetcar' as a point of breakthrough in his career.

In 1985, Shaw played Elvis Presley in Alan Bleasdale's Are You Lonesome Tonight?. It told the story of Presley's last few hours. After a long run in London, the production visited Sydney, Melbourne and Adelaide in Australia.

Shaw's portrayal of Lord Goring in An Ideal Husband on Broadway earned him a Tony Award nomination and a Drama Desk award.

After filming finished on the TV series Judge John Deed, Shaw took the role of Thomas More in Robert Bolt's play A Man for All Seasons. Shaw's daughter, Sophie, played opposite him as More's daughter, Margaret. The production toured Britain's cities before a run in London at the Theatre Royal Haymarket. In summer 2025 he reprised the role at the same theatre for a limited season.

In 2013, in a new production of the classic play Twelve Angry Men at the Garrick Theatre in London, Shaw played the part of the dissenting juror (identified as juror number 8).

In 2016, Shaw toured and returned to the West End again with a production of Hobson's Choice at the Vaudeville. After completing the filming of the final episode of Inspector George Gently, Shaw again toured in 2017 with the UK premiere of Gore Vidal's 1960 political piece The Best Man. Shaw played the part of William Russell, former US Secretary of State.

=== Television ===
Shaw began television work in 1967. Parts in one-off plays for Granada Television led to his playing hippy student Robert Croft, Lucile Hewitt's boyfriend, in Coronation Street. Another early role was booze and football-loving Welsh medical student Huw Evans in the television comedy series Doctor in the House. He later guest-starred, playing the same role, in the follow-up series Doctor at Large, now a nervous expectant father in the episode "Mother and Father Doing Well". The actor had been introduced to international audiences via his portrayal of Horatio in the 1970 Hallmark Hall of Fame presentation of Hamlet, starring Richard Chamberlain.

Shaw appeared with future co-star Lewis Collins in an episode of The New Avengers. Both played the roles of terrorists. Shaw portrayed Ray Doyle ("Agent 4-5") in the British television series The Professionals (1977–1983), opposite Collins. Shaw played another law-enforcement role in the 1990s ITV production The Chief.

In 1983, Shaw played Robert Falcon Scott in The Last Place on Earth. The series was filmed at Frobisher Bay near the city of Iqaluit on Baffin Island, Canada. In interview at the time, Shaw commented that he generally responded well to the testing physical conditions, particularly when they enhanced the reality of the scene. In the same year he played Sir Henry Baskerville in The Hound of the Baskervilles, an adaptation of the novel by Sir Arthur Conan Doyle. He acted opposite Ian Richardson's Sherlock Holmes and Donald Churchill's Dr. Watson.

He played Cecil Rhodes in Rhodes, an eight-part serial that aired in 1996 and was filmed on location in South Africa. Shaw's younger son, Joe, took early leave of his drama school course to play the part of the youthful Rhodes.

Another television acting credit includes the role of Mr (later Prof) Robert Kingsford in Always and Everyone (1999–2002), a British accident and emergency medical series, played alongside Niamh Cusack.

In 2001, he took the title role in the BBC drama Judge John Deed. The character gave an editorial voice to the television writer and producer G.F. Newman's ideas about lifestyle choices such as vegetarianism and alternative medicine as well as issues of social justice. One episode about the safety of the MMR vaccine was banned.

Between seasons of Judge John Deed, Shaw took the role of poetic bespectacled forensic detective Adam Dalgliesh in P.D. James's Death in Holy Orders in 2003 and The Murder Room in 2005. After the sixth season of Judge John Deed had been filmed, Shaw appeared in the series Apparitions, broadcast by the BBC in 2008. This was Shaw's first project as executive director.

From 2007 until 2017 he played the title role in the BBC TV series Inspector George Gently. On 9 May 2015 Shaw recited "For the Fallen" at VE Day 70: A Party to Remember in Horse Guards Parade, London which was broadcast on BBC One.

In 2021 he played the role of Dennis Stephenson, leader of a fictitious religious cult called the Barum Brethren, in the BritBox original series The Long Call. The series premiered in autumn 2021, and is based on the Ann Cleeves bestselling novel.

=== Film ===
Shaw's first film role was as an Irish communist in a 1967 television adaptation of the novel, Love on the Dole. Better known is his 1971 role of Banquo in Roman Polanski's Macbeth. He has also been seen as an undercover Second World War operative in the 1975 production Operation Daybreak; a singing and dancing futuristic magician "Zax" in Facelift; the role of Rachid in the 1973 film The Golden Voyage of Sinbad, and a wanted villain leading a life on the run in a circus troupe in Ladder of Swords (1989).

=== Narration and documentaries ===
Shaw has narrated many audiobooks, including Tolkien's The Hobbit and The Silmarillion; Swift's Gulliver's Travels; and Emily Brontë's Wuthering Heights. In 2006, Shaw narrated and appeared in a DVD chronicling the "Merlins over Malta" project. This featured the return of a Second World War Supermarine Spitfire and Hawker Hurricane from Britain to Malta for the first time in fifty years.

In December 2006, Shaw presented the six-part Discovery Channel Real Time TV series Martin Shaw: Aviators, produced by Twofour, which followed the two-year restoration of his Boeing Stearman biplane after it was crashed by another pilot at Old Buckenham airfield in Norfolk. Shaw fulfilled a lifetime ambition to take the controls of a Spitfire and, though take-off was not permitted, he also powered an English Electric Lightning to 150 mph in three seconds along the runway at Cranfield Airport. Shaw also compared notes with the builder and developer of the modern autogyro, Wing Cdr Ken Wallis.

In 2010 he presented a documentary for the BBC titled Dambusters Declassified in which he investigated and debunked some of the myths of the dambusters raid known as Operation Chastise story which had been portrayed in the books Enemy Coast Ahead and The Dambusters, and the film The Dam Busters.

=== Advertisements ===
Among several voiceovers and appearances, in 1974, Shaw starred in a three-minute advertisement for the Mk II Ford Capri and in 1987, a TV advert for the Vauxhall Cavalier.

== Personal life and activism ==
In 1971, Shaw became a follower of Charan Singh, of the contemporary Sant Mat religion.

Shaw lives in Wreningham in Norfolk.

On 18 August 2010, Shaw collapsed during the first act of the matinee showing of A Country Girl at Shrewsbury's Theatre Severn. His agent said he had been suffering from cracked ribs and was taking antibiotics for a severe chest infection. An understudy went on in his place.

Shaw has been a vegetarian since about 1974. He has a prominent scar on his right cheek, the result of a mugging, after which he became a teetotaller.

=== Charity work ===
Shaw is a celebrity activist for animal rights and animal welfare. He is the patron of the Hillside Animal Sanctuary in Frettenham in Norfolk, a charity organisation which provides a safe home for neglected and abused animals. He also supports Viva! and Dr Hadwen Trust.

In March 2012, he also announced that he would become the official patron to the community organisation Stop Norwich UrBanisation (SNUB), the aim of which is to protect Norfolk's countryside from overdevelopment and excessive urbanisation. In the press release, he stated that he was "simply furious and upset by your plight and that of all of us who wish to live in quiet and peace. I will be your Patron and keep fighting."

== Selected credits ==
=== Theatre ===
- Look Back in Anger (Royal Court transferring to the Criterion Theatre, 1968) as "Cliff Lewis".
- The Contractor (Royal Court, 1969; transferring to the Fortune Theatre, 1970) as "Paul".
- The Battle of Shrivings (Lyric Theatre, 1970) as "David".
- Cancer (in the United States, Moon Children; Royal Court, 1970) as "Bob".
- The Bacchae of Euripides: A Communion Rite (National Theatre at the Old Vic, 1973) as "Dionysus".
- Saturday, Sunday, Monday (National Theatre at the Old Vic, 1973) as "Attilio" opposite Laurence Olivier.
- A Streetcar Named Desire (Piccadilly Theatre, 1974) as "Stanley Kowalski".
- Miss Julie (Greenwich Theatre, 1975) as "Jean".
- Teeth 'n' Smiles (Wyndham's Theatre, 1976) as "Arthur".
- They're Playing Our Song (Shaftesbury Theatre, 1981) as "Vernon Gersch".
- The Country Girl (Apollo Theatre, 1983).
- Are You Lonesome Tonight? (Phoenix Theatre, 1985) as 'The Older Elvis Presley' (also Sydney, New South Wales, Australia)
- The Big Knife (Albery Theatre, 1987) as Charles Castle
- Other People's Money (Lyric Theatre, 1990) as "Garfinkel".
- Betrayal (Almeida Theatre, 1991) as "Robert".
- Sienna Red, by Stephen Poliakoff and co-starring Francesca Annis (Richmond Theatre, May 1992).
- An Ideal Husband (Globe Theatre, 1992) as "Lord Goring".
- Rough Justice by Terence Frisby (Apollo Theatre, 1994) as "James Highwood".
- An Ideal Husband (Haymarket Theatre transferring to the Old Vic, 1996; revived at the Haymarket in 1997 then transferred to the Gielgud Theatre).
- Vertigo (Theatre Royal Windsor, October 1998) as "Roger Flaviares" alongside his subsequent co-star Jenny Seagrove in Judge John Deed.
- A Man For All Seasons (Haymarket, 2005/6) as Sir Thomas More.
- The Country Girl (Apollo Theatre, October 2010) co-starring Jenny Seagrove, following a tour.
- Hobson's Choice, (Vaudeville Theatre, 2016) as Henry Hobson.
- A Man for All Seasons (The Lowry 2026) as Sir Thomas More.

=== Film ===
- Macbeth (1971) as Banquo.
- The Golden Voyage of Sinbad (1973) as Rachid.
- Operation Daybreak (1975) as Sergeant Karel Čurda.
- Facelift (1984) as Zax.
- Intrigue (1988) As Roskov
- Ladder of Swords (1989).
- Oilman (short film).
- 6 Days (2017) as Dellow
- Off the Rails (2021) as Federico

=== Television ===
- Coronation Street (1967–1968) as Robert Croft (5 episodes)
- Villains (1972) as Monty Parkin (3 episodes)
- On the Move (1975–1976) as Martin
- Helen: A Woman of Today (1973) as Frank Tully
- Love's Labours Lost (1975) as Ferdinand, King of Navarre
- The Duchess of Duke Street "Family Matters" (1976) as Arthur
- The New Avengers "Obsession" (1977) as Larry
- The Professionals (1977–1983) as Ray Doyle
- Doctor in the House (1969) as Huw Evans
- Doctor at Large (1971) as Huw Evans (11 episodes)
- Beasts (1976) as Dave (episode "Buddyboy")
- Cream in My Coffee (by Dennis Potter) (1980) as Jack Butcher
- East Lynne (1982) as Archibald Carlyle
- The Hound of the Baskervilles (1983) as Sir Henry Baskerville
- The Last Place on Earth (1985) as Robert Falcon Scott
- The Chief (1993–1995) as Chief Constable Alan Cade
- Rhodes (1996) as Cecil Rhodes
- The Scarlet Pimpernel (1999–2000) as Chauvelin
- Always and Everyone (1999–2002) as Robert Kingsford
- Judge John Deed (2001–2007) as Judge John Deed
- Death in Holy Orders (2003) as Adam Dalgliesh
- The Murder Room (2004) as Adam Dalgliesh
- Martin Shaw: Aviators (2006)
- Cranford (2007) as Peter Jenkyns
- Inspector George Gently (2007–2017) as George Gently
- Lemur Street (2007)
- Apparitions (2008) as Father Jacob
- Agatha Christie's Poirot Three Act Tragedy (2010) as Charles Cartwright
- Dambusters Declassified (2010) as presenter
- Playhouse Presents (2012) as Piers Hunt
- Strike (2017) as Tony Landry
- The Long Call (2021) as Dennis Stephenson

== Awards and nominations ==
Shaw won two awards for his performance as Lord Goring in the 1996 Broadway production of An Ideal Husband and was nominated for a third:

- Winner of the Drama Desk Award for Outstanding Featured Actor in a Play
- Winner of the Theatre World Special Award for Ensemble Performance
- Nominated for the Tony Award for Best Leading Actor in a Play
