= A Mind to Murder =

1963 novel by P. D. James

A Mind To Murder
- First edition
- Author: P. D. James
- Language: English
- Series: Adam Dalgliesh #2
- Genre: Crime, mystery
- Publisher: Faber
- Publication date: 1963
- Publication place: United Kingdom
- Media type: Print
- OCLC: 46386132
- Preceded by: Cover Her Face
- Followed by: Unnatural Causes

A Mind to Murder is a 1963 crime novel by English writer P. D. James, the second in her Adam Dalgliesh series.

== Synopsis ==
In a psychiatric clinic late one night, the piercing scream of a dying woman shatters the calm, and Detective Superintendent Dalgliesh arrives to investigate. He soon finds the body of a clinic employee sprawled across the basement floor, with a chisel driven through her heart. This marks the beginning of a psychological battle with an intellectual, predatory killer who feels no remorse, no regret and no self-control.

== Reception ==
Chicago Daily News wrote about the novel: "With discernment, depth and craftsmanship, A Mind to Murder is a superbly satisfying mystery."
