= Original Sin (James novel) =

1994 Dalgliesh novel by P. D. James

- First edition
- Author: P. D. James
- Language: English
- Series: Adam Dalgliesh #9
- Genre: Crime, mystery
- Publisher: Faber & Faber
- Publication date: 2 November 1994
- Publication place: United Kingdom
- Media type: Print (Hardback & Paperback)
- Pages: 400
- ISBN: 0-571-17253-9
- OCLC: 32108614
- Preceded by: Devices and Desires
- Followed by: A Certain Justice

Original Sin is a 1994 detective novel by English writer P. D. James, the ninth book of her Adam Dalgliesh series. It is set in London, mainly in Wapping in the Borough of Tower Hamlets, and centers on the city's oldest publishing house, Peverell Press, headquartered in a mock-Venetian palace on the River Thames.

== Plot summary ==
The murder of Peverell Press's managing director, ambitious Gerard Etienne, seems to be the horrible end of a series of malicious pranks in the company headquarters. When Adam Dalgliesh is called to the scene to solve the murder, he soon finds out that the killer does not intend to stop with Etienne.

== Reception ==
In a 1995 book review for The New York Times, Michael Malone wrote "Lady James, a novelist of broad gifts and great skill, here is writing in full mastery of her craft and in full indulgence of her predilections. The staples to which we have become accustomed are all present in force, including the textually rich details of architecture and furnishings that at times work in support of the story, and at other times seem to emerge from the author's compulsion to describe all that her eye has seen, whether that is an Anglo-Celtic church on Blackwater estuary or the cool bare lines of a modern flat in the Barbican. As ever, Lady James, the grande dame of fictional forensic pathology, vividly renders the ugly reality of violent death: the smell of a corpse, the look of an autopsy in a sterile post-mortem room, the random residue of lives abruptly stopped." Conversely, Iain Sinclair reviewed the book for the London Review of Books and wrote "This is an empty set, a set defined by its architecture... An increasingly silly catalogue of deaths and suicides announces the final surrender of the Golden Age Murder Mystery: Agatha Christie force-fed on Pevsner and the humbug of Kenneth Baker’s latest flag-waving anthology. A subgenre that has always been profoundly conservative (hence its popularity, up there with P.G. Wodehouse, in America) is reduced to editorialised sound-bites from a phantom Smith Square manifesto... Autopilot opinions suggesting that the author has donated far too much of her time to media book-gabble and the smokefree backrooms of power."

== Adaptations ==
A television version of the novel was produced for Britain's ITV network in 1997. It starred Roy Marsden as Adam Dalgliesh.
