= Cover Her Face =

1962 Dalgliesh novel by P. D. James

- First edition cover
- Author: P. D. James
- Cover artist: Charles Mozley
- Language: English
- Series: Adam Dalgliesh No. 1
- Genre: Crime, Mystery novel
- Publisher: Faber and Faber
- Publication date: December 1962
- Publication place: United Kingdom
- Media type: Print (hardback & paperback)
- Followed by: A Mind to Murder

Cover Her Face is the debut 1962 crime novel of P. D. James. It details the investigations into the death of a young, ambitious maid, surrounded by a family which has reasons to want her gone – or dead. The title is taken from a passage from John Webster's The Duchess of Malfi: "Cover her face. Mine eyes dazzle; she died young," which is quoted by one of the characters in the novel.

== Plot summary ==
The story opens with a dinner party hosted by Mrs. Eleanor Maxie at Martingale, a manor house in the (fictional) Essex village of Chadfleet. Mrs. Maxie's son and daughter, Stephen Maxie and Deborah Riscoe, are both at the party. Serving at table is Sally Jupp, chosen from a local refuge for unmarried mothers to help in the house by Mrs Maxie and now living in with her infant son, Jimmy. Also present at the meal are Stephen's former romantic interest, Catherine Bowers; Alice Liddell, warden of St Mary's Refuge; and Dr Epps, the family doctor.

Deborah later visits Stephen at the hospital where he works and sees her brother talking with Sally. Stephen says that Sally had brought him some of their terminally ill father's sleeping tablets, Sommeil, which she found under old Mr. Maxie's bed. Stephen suspects that Mr. Maxie has managed to deceive his devoted servant Martha, pretending to take the tablets when he is simply concealing them for a suicide attempt. On the day of St. Cedd's church fete, Sally announces that Stephen has asked her to marry him. The following day, Martha complains that Sally has overslept again. On entering the room, Sally's strangled body is found. Detective Chief Inspector Adam Dalgliesh and Detective Sergeant Martin arrive and begin their investigation.

It emerges much later that Sally had been secretly married to James Ritchie, who returns from his job in Venezuela after her death. Sally had blackmailed her uncle (who unbeknownst to her had spent her trust fund) into giving her 30 pounds. She had pretended to be unmarried because revealing her marriage would have jeopardised her husband's job and she liked to "play with people". She revealed Stephen Maxie's proposal of marriage for the same reason, although it is notable that she had not accepted it, and deliberately uses Deborah's mug for her cocoa on her final night.

The cocoa discovered at Sally's bedside is found to contain traces of Mr Maxie's sleeping tablets. Martha has been using them to drug Sally's cocoa so that she would oversleep, be discredited and eventually dismissed. It is Mrs. Eleanor Maxie who eventually confesses to the murder of Sally Jupp after Dalgliesh reveals everyone's movements on the night. It is clear, through a process of elimination, that only she could be the culprit.

The novel ends with a later meeting between Adam Dalgliesh and Deborah Riscoe, where it is hinted that a future relationship will develop between them.

== The characters ==
Detective Chief Inspector Adam Dalgliesh of Scotland Yard

Detective Sergeant Martin - his assistant

Mrs. Eleanor Maxie – owner of Martingale, mother to Stephen and Deborah

Stephen Maxie - surgeon at a London hospital

Deborah Riscoe – widowed daughter of Eleanor

Mr. Simon Maxie – Eleanor's invalid husband

Felix Hearne – a former war hero and Deborah's admirer

Catherine Bowers – a guest at Martingale who hopes to marry Stephen Maxie

Dr. Charles Epps – long-time physician of the Maxies

Bernard Hinks – vicar of Chadfleet

Miss Alice Liddell – Warden of St. Mary's Refuge for Girls

Martha Bultitaft – the Maxie's long-time domestic servant

Sally Jupp – domestic servant assisting Martha at Martingale for several months

Mr. and Mrs. Proctor – Sally's aunt and uncle who raised her after her parents were killed during the Blitz

James Ritchie – Sally's secret husband

== Literary significance and criticism ==
The novel was generally very well received by critics although the author later described it as her least favourite among her books.

"Her first detective story, immediately pleasing and impressive. The pace is deliberate, the characterization of the members of an English county family very well done, and the central character of Sally Jupp – a servant girl with imagination and a love of power – most unusual but compelling. Insp. Dalgliesh is perhaps too quietly competent in his disclosure of Sally's killer – and, despite the title, the girl isn't a Duchess of Malfi." – A Catalogue of Crime

In a 1966 book review, Anthony Boucher of The New York Times wrote "This is a literate and not unpromising first novel, but modeled firmly upon the detective story of 30 years ago at its dullest... When I keep urging a return to the formal detective story, this is not what I mean."

== Adaptations ==
A television version of the novel was produced for Britain's ITV network in 1985. It starred Roy Marsden as Adam Dalgliesh, John Vine as Inspector John Massingham (instead of Detective Sergeant Martin), Phyllis Calvert as Eleanor Maxie, Rupert Frazer as Stephen Maxie, Mel Martin as Deborah Riscoe, Julian Glover as Felix Hearne, and Kim Thomson as Sally Jupp. As the television adaptation was set contemporaneously but the characters' ages had to remain unchanged, Felix Hearne's military service was relocated to Cyprus and a secondary storyline was added about Cypriot drug-dealers. It was filmed at Rainthorpe Hall in Norfolk.

BBC Radio 4 produced a radio serial in 1993, adapted by Neville Teller, with Hugh Grant as Felix, Robin Ellis as Dalgliesh and Siân Phillips as Mrs Maxie, releasing it on CD shortly after airing.
