= A Certain Justice =

1997 Dalgliesh novel by P. D. James

- First edition
- Author: P. D. James
- Language: English
- Series: Adam Dalgliesh #10
- Genre: Mystery novel
- Publisher: Faber & Faber
- Publication date: 1 October 1997
- Publication place: United Kingdom
- Media type: Print (Hardback & Paperback)
- Pages: 400 pp (first edition, hardback)
- ISBN: 0-571-19164-9 (first edition, hardback)
- OCLC: 37787677
- Dewey Decimal: 823/.914 21
- LC Class: PR6060.A467 C45 1997c
- Preceded by: Original Sin
- Followed by: Death in Holy Orders

A Certain Justice is a detective novel by British writer P. D. James, published in 1997 by Faber & Faber in the UK and by Alfred A. Knopf in the US. It was the tenth to feature her recurring character Adam Dalgliesh and the book was dedicated to her five grandchildren.

== Plot summary ==
Venetia Aldridge is a brilliant criminal lawyer who is set to take over as Head of Chambers at Pawlet Court, a fictitious London Inn of Court. Then she is found stabbed to death in her room, wearing an old-fashioned wig which has been doused in blood. Knowledge of where to find the wig, and the blood stored in a refrigerator ready for a private operation, indicates that the most probable culprit comes from Pawlet Court itself, where Venetia has made many enemies.

The present Head of Chambers, Hubert Langton, would prefer his successor to be Drysdale Laud, with whom he confers regularly. Dependent on that succession also will be the professional future of more junior members, such as Simon Costello, in whose casework Venetia has discovered irregularities; or Catherine Beddington, who Venetia does not consider able enough to continue in chambers once her pupillage ends. More tenuously, Desmond Ulrick's younger brother had committed suicide in the past while at the school tyrannised by Venetia's headmaster father. And among employees on the chambers staff are other potential enemies: Harry Naughton, the Senior Clerk who is unlikely to persuade Venetia to allow him to work beyond retirement age so as to make ends meet; or the secretary of chambers, Valerie Caldwell, whose delinquent brother Venetia refuses to defend.

In the past Venetia had successfully defended a murderer who went on to commit other crimes as well as a child rapist. The grandmother of one of the victims, Mrs. Carpenter, is now employed by the agency contracted to clean Pawlet Court in the evening. More recently Venetia has successfully defended Garry Ashe against the charge of the murder of his prostitute aunt and now faces the unwelcome fact that Garry has become engaged to her daughter, Octavia.

Hubert Langton reports the murder to Scotland Yard, where he already knows Commander Adam Dalgliesh. The Commander arrives with his assistants, Detective Inspectors Kate Miskin and Piers Tarrant, and together they begin establishing the alibis of all those possibly connected to the case. Among them is the MP Mark Rawlestone, a former bed partner of convenience with whom Venetia has only recently parted acrimoniously. Then there is Venetia's former husband, Luke, now remarried and living in Dorset. As it happened, Venetia had summoned Luke to London to try to buy off Ashe, but his new and much more decisive partner Anna had gone instead. Since this was on the evening that Venetia was murdered, the appointment was not kept.

While the investigation is proceeding, Dalgliesh is contacted by Edmund Frogett, formerly the Deputy Headmaster at Danesford, the school run by Venetia's father. Frogett had initially inspired Venetia's interest in the law and, since she had grown up, he has been following her progress. It is the scrapbook he kept of her cases that he wishes to present to Dalgliesh as of possible use in his inquiries. While following the trials, Frogett had also struck up a friendship with the elderly Mrs Carpenter, who had concealed from him her own vengeful interest in Venetia's career. But before Dalgliesh can question Mrs Carpenter, she is murdered in her flat, though only after sending the local priest a letter admitting her part in the affair. She had discovered Venetia's body already stabbed and had only been guilty of desecrating it with the bloody wig. She also admits that it was she who had bribed Ashe to seduce Octavia so as to make Venetia suffer as her own family had suffered.

Ashe, meanwhile, has taken Octavia on the pillion of his motorcycle and left for the Suffolk salt marshes where he remembers an old childhood haunt. They are pursued by the police and Octavia is only rescued from being murdered by the effective sharp shooting of DI Tarrant. However, it was not Ashe who had killed Venetia. That was the work of Ulrick, whose niece is married to the threatened Simon Costello, though there is no substantial evidence that could convict him.

== Human limitation ==
The phrase used as the novel's title occurs near the end of its final chapter. There the lawyer Ulrick comments ironically to the lawman Dalgliesh that there is no such thing as absolute justice. "It is good for us to be reminded from time to time that our system of law is human and, therefore, fallible and that the most we can hope to achieve is a certain [kind of] justice."

The comment on the limitations of human judicial institutions demonstrated in the novel has since been considered profound enough to be quoted in a theological essay and a work on international legislation, as well as an academic literary study of the concept of law as presented in James's novel.

== Reception ==
The 2020 Faber reissue of the novel featured on its new cover praise from the 1997 review in The Sunday Telegraph, "Ingenious and beautifully written, this is P. D. James at her highly impressive best". In his review for The New York Times, Ben Macintyre also praised A Certain Justice as "vintage James" and summarised it as "a book in which revenge is not quite sated and deserts are not always just. That may not be the most satisfying conclusion, but it contains a certain truth." In addition, the Denver Post comments on how the book's literary excellence transcends the limitations of its genre: "More than anything else [it] demonstrates the fine and rare art of good fiction. Yes, this is a detective novel, but it is first and foremost a novel."

== Adaptations ==
A television version of A Certain Justice was produced for Britain's ITV network in 1998 as a three-episode mini-series and another was made in 2023 for Channel 5 as the second in its Dalgliesh series.

A one and a half hour BBC radio drama written by Neville Teller was produced in 2005 and repeated thereafter. This opens with a phone call from Edmund Frogett to Dalgliesh, offering him information relative to the case.
