= Bertie Carvel =

British actor (born 1977)

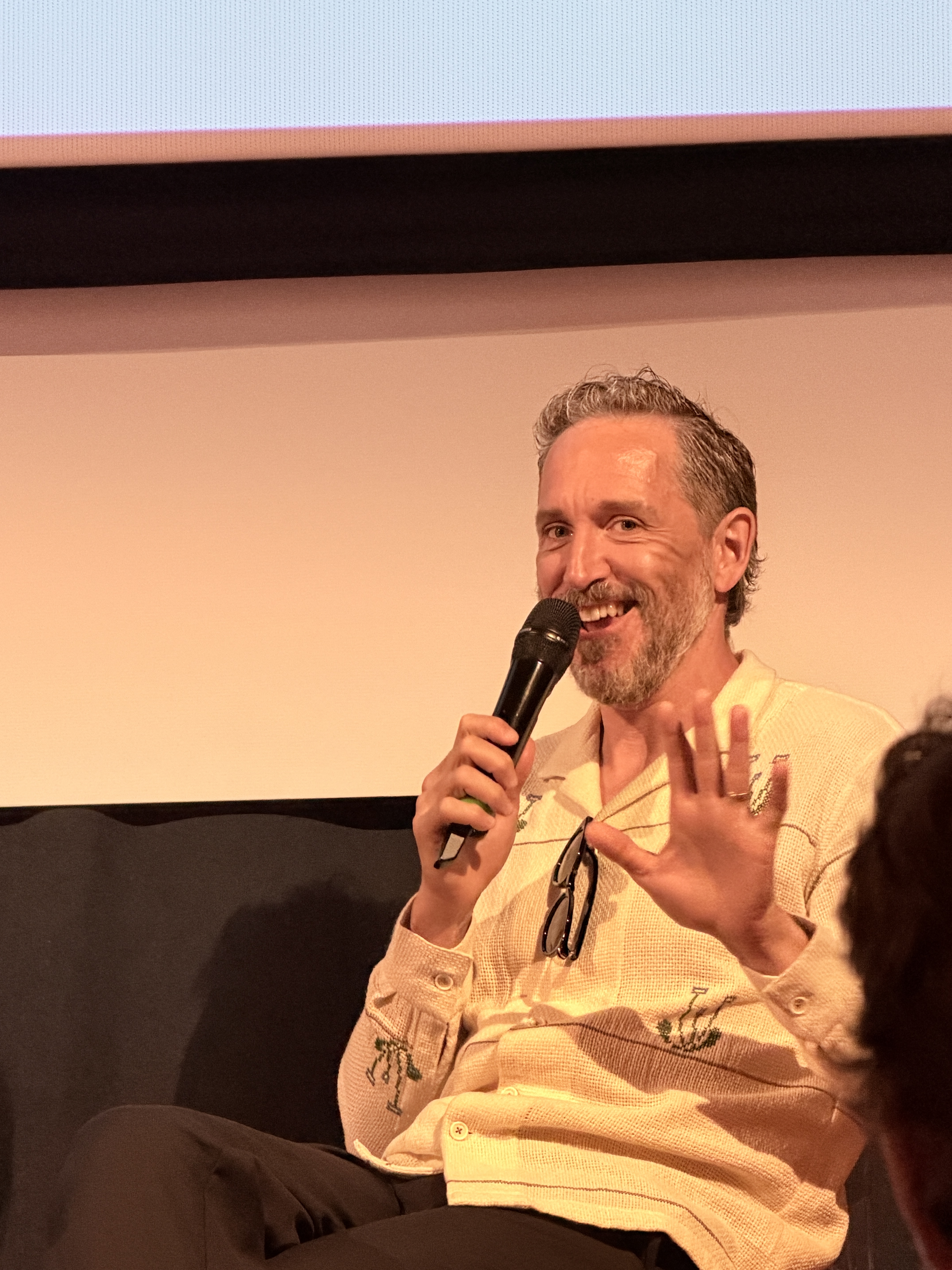
- Carvel in 2026
- Born: Robert Hugh Carvel; 6 September 1977 (age 49); Marylebone, London, England
- Education: University of Sussex; Royal Academy of Dramatic Art
- Occupation: Actor
- Years active: 2003–present
- Spouse: Sally Scott (m. 2019)
- Children: 1

Robert Hugh Carvel (born 6 September 1977) is a British actor. He has twice won a Laurence Olivier Award for Best Actor in a Leading Role in a Musical for his role as Miss Trunchbull in Matilda the Musical, and for Best Actor in a Supporting Role for his performance as Rupert Murdoch in Ink. For the latter role, he also won the Tony Award for Best Actor in a Featured Role in a Play.

On television, Carvel is known for playing Jonathan Strange in Jonathan Strange & Mr Norrell (2015), Simon Foster in Doctor Foster (2015–2017), Adam Dalgliesh in Dalgliesh (2021–2024), Tony Blair in The Crown (2022–2023), and Prince Baelor "Breakspear" Targaryen in A Knight of the Seven Kingdoms (2026).

== Early life and education ==
Robert Hugh Carvel was born on 6 September 1977 in Marylebone, London, the son of psychologist Patricia and journalist John Carvel. His father worked for The Guardian, his grandfather for The Standard, and his great-grandfather for The Star. Carvel was educated at University College School in London and studied English at the University of Sussex, graduating with a first-class honours degree. He trained as an actor at the Royal Academy of Dramatic Art from 2000 to 2003, supported by scholarships from The Wall Trust and the Sir John Cass Foundation.

== Career ==
=== 2003–2010 ===
Carvel has appeared in Revelations at the Hampstead Theatre, in Rose Bernd at the Arcola Theatre, as Alexander Ashbrook in the 2005–2006 and 2006–2007 National Theatre production of Helen Edmundson's Coram Boy and in their productions of The Life of Galileo and The Man of Mode, in Parade at the Donmar Warehouse, and in Matilda the Musical at the Cambridge Theatre, produced by the Royal Shakespeare Company.

Carvel was nominated for the Laurence Olivier Award for Best Actor in a Leading Role in a Musical for his performance in Parade in 2008. He won the award in the same category in 2012 for his performance as Miss Trunchbull in Matilda the Musical, a production that won six other Oliviers. Carvel also won the UK's TMA Award for Best Performance in a Musical and was similarly nominated for the London's Evening Standard Award. He played Enrico in Damned By Despair at the National Theatre.

=== 2011–2020 ===
From 2011 to 2024, Carvel was the voice of the male Imperial Agent in the MMORPG Star Wars: The Old Republic until the role was reassigned to Wilf Scolding. In March 2013, he reprised his role as Miss Trunchbull in Matilda on Broadway at the Shubert Theatre. This won him a Drama Desk Award for Outstanding Actor in a Featured Role in a Musical and a nomination for Tony Award for Best Actor in a Leading Role in a Musical, one of only a handful of nominations for an actor portraying a character of the opposite sex. From August to October 2015, Carvel played both Pentheus and Agave in Bakkhai at the Almeida Theatre. Carvel also performed as Yank in the play The Hairy Ape at the Old Vic in November of the same year. In February 2016, Carvel announced his directorial debut. He directed the play Strife at the Minerva Theatre, Chichester, which opened in August 2016.

In September 2017, Carvel played the role of Rupert Murdoch in the play Ink by James Graham, which debuted at the Almeida Theatre before transferring to the West End. In April 2019 Ink transferred to Broadway, with Carvel reprising his role. This performance won him a Tony Award for Best Featured Actor in a Play.

Carvel other project’s include The Wrong Mans, Babylon, Doctor Who (episode "The Lazarus Experiment"), Sherlock (episode "The Blind Banker"), Bombshell, Hawking, The Crimson Petal and the White, Money and Midsomer Murders (episode "The Great and the Good"). He played Lord Carmarthen in John Adams. In the television film Agatha Christie: A Life in Pictures, he played Christie's second husband Max Mallowan. Carvel appeared as Bamatabois in the film Les Misérables, based on the musical of the same name. In 2009, Carvel played Wormwood in Focus on the Family's audio adaptation of The Screwtape Letters, alongside Andy Serkis as Screwtape. This production was a 2010 Audie Award finalist.

In 2015, Carvel starred as Jonathan Strange in the BBC One adaptation of Susanna Clarke's novel Jonathan Strange & Mr Norrell, opposite Eddie Marsan as Gilbert Norrell. He played Nick Clegg in the Channel 4 drama Coalition and in September appeared as the unfaithful husband of Suranne Jones's title character in the BBC One thriller series Doctor Foster. The second series of Doctor Foster started filming in September 2016 and was broadcast in September 2017.

=== 2021–present ===
Since 2021, Carvel has starred as Adam Dalgliesh in Helen Edmundson's Dalgliesh. He plays former Prime Minister Tony Blair in the fifth and sixth series of The Crown. In April 2025, it was revealed that Bertie Carvel would serve as the narrator for the upcoming revival of Walking With Dinosaurs. In 2022, he returned to The Old Vic to play US President Donald Trump in The 47th, a play by Mike Bartlett.

Carvel portrays Baelor Targaryen in the series A Knight of the Seven Kingdoms (2026). On June 9, 2025, it was reported that Carvel would play Cornelius Fudge in the upcoming Harry Potter television series.

== Personal life ==
Carvel and actress Sally Scott met in 2009 through close friends. Scott proposed to him on WhatsApp while he was working on Baghdad Central, and they married in January 2019. Their son was born in May 2020.

Carvel is a patron of the Globe Theatre's education department's "Playing Shakespeare" programme, which provides free educational resources and free theatre tickets to secondary school students. In 2013, he ran for and was elected to Equity's 11-person Stage Committee, and was re-elected for a further two-year term in 2015.

== Acting credits ==
=== Film ===
Year	Title	Role	Notes	Ref.
2012	Les Misérables	Bamatabois		
2021	The Tragedy of Macbeth	Banquo		
2026	Ink	Hugh Cudlipp		

=== Television ===
Year	Title	Role	Notes	Ref.
2004	Hawking	George Ellis	Television film	
2004	Agatha Christie: A Life in Pictures	Max Mallowan	Television film	
2005	Beethoven	Ferdinand Ries	2 episodes	
2006	Bombshell	Lieutenant Roddy Frost	7 episodes	
2006	Holby City	Martin Phillips	Episode: "Looking After Number One"	
2007	Doctor Who	Mysterious Man	Episode: "The Lazarus Experiment"	
2008	John Adams	Lord Carmarthen	Episode: "Reunion"	
2009	Primeval	Ryan Mason	Episode: "Haunted House"	
2009	Waking the Dead	Dr Dench	2 episodes	
2009	Midsomer Murders	Justin Hooper	Episode: "The Great and the Good"	
2010	Sherlock	Sebastian Wilkes	Episode: "The Blind Banker"	
2010	Just William	Uncle Neville	Episode: "Parrots for Ethel"	
2011	The Crimson Petal and the White	Ashwell	3 episodes	
2011	Hidden	Alexander Wentworth	4 episodes	
2012	Restless	Mason Harding	Episode: "Part Two"	
2014	Babylon	Finn Kirkwood	7 episodes	
2014	The Wrong Mans	Nathan Cross	Episode: "White Mans"	
2015	Coalition	Nick Clegg	Television film	
2015	Jonathan Strange & Mr Norrell	Jonathan Strange	7 episodes	
2015–2017	Doctor Foster	Simon Foster	Two series, lead role	
2016	Revolting Rhymes	Various voices	2 episodes	
2017	The Crown	Robin Day	Episode: "Marionettes"	
2018	Big Cats	Narrator	3 episodes	
2020	The Pale Horse	Zachariah Osborne	2 episodes	
2020	Baghdad Central	Frank Temple	6 episodes	
2020	The Sister	Robert “Bob” Morrow	4 episodes	
2021–present	Dalgliesh	Adam Dalgliesh	Lead role	
2022–2023	The Crown	Tony Blair	Supporting role (Season 5); Main role (Season 6)	
2025	Walking with Dinosaurs	Narrator	6 episodes	
2026	A Knight of the Seven Kingdoms	Prince Baelor "Breakspear" Targaryen	4 episodes	
2026–present	Harry Potter	Cornelius Fudge	Supporting role	

=== Theatre ===
Year	Title	Role	Theatre	Ref.
2003	Revelations	Jack	Hampstead Theatre	
2004	Victory? A Musical Drama For Peace	Uri	Donmar Warehouse	
2005	Rose Bernd	Heinzel/Policeman	Oxford Stage Company/Arcola Theatre/Dumbfounded Theatre	
2004	Macbeth	Macbeth	Union Theatre, London	
2005	Faustus	Faustus	Etcetera Theatre	
2005–07	Coram Boy	Alexander Ashbrook (adult) / Ensemble	National Theatre	
2005	Professor Bernhardi	Dr Kurt Pflugfelder/Professor Filitz	Arcola Theatre	
2006	The Life of Galileo	Ludovico Marsili	National Theatre	
2007	The Man of Mode	Medley	National Theatre	
2008	The Pride	Oliver	Royal Court Theatre	
2008	Parade	Leo Frank	Donmar Warehouse	
2008	The Circle	Edward Luton	Chichester/Tour	
2009	Rope	Rupert Cadell	Almeida Theatre	
2011	Dr Dee	Dr Dee	Palace Theatre, Manchester	
2010–13	Matilda the Musical	Miss Trunchbull	Courtyard Theatre; 9 November 2010 – 30 January 2011	
2010–13	Matilda the Musical	Miss Trunchbull	Cambridge Theatre; 25 October 2011 – July 2012	
2010–13	Matilda the Musical	Miss Trunchbull	Shubert Theatre; 4 March 2013 – 1 September 2013	
2011	Damned By Despair	Enrico	National Theatre	
2015	Bakkhai	Pentheus, Agave	Almeida Theatre	
2015	The Hairy Ape	Yank	The Old Vic	
2016	Splendid's	Policeman	Trafalgar Studios; Rehearsed reading	
2017–19	Ink	Rupert Murdoch	Almeida Theatre; 17 June – 5 August 2017	
2017–19	Ink	Rupert Murdoch	Duke of York's Theatre; 9 September 2017 – 6 January 2018	
2017–19	Ink	Rupert Murdoch	Samuel J. Friedman Theatre; 2 April 2019 – 7 July 2019	
2022	The 47th	Donald Trump	The Old Vic; 29 Mar - 28 May 2022	
2023	Pygmalion	Henry Higgins	The Old Vic	
2025	The Winter's Tale	Leontes	Royal Shakespeare Theatre	

=== Video games ===
Year	Title	Role	Ref.
2008	Haze	Shane Carpenter	
2011–2024	Star Wars: The Old Republic	Male Imperial Agent	
2012	The Secret World	The Forest God, Callisto	

=== Audio ===
Year	Title	Role	Ref.
2004	The Odyssey	Hermes	
2009	The Screwtape Letters	Wormwood	

== Accolades ==
=== Theatre ===
Year	Award	Category	Work	Result	Ref.
2008	Laurence Olivier Award	Best Actor in a Leading Role in a Musical	Parade	Nominated	
2011	Evening Standard Theatre Award	Best Actor	Matilda the Musical	Nominated	
2012	Laurence Olivier Award	Best Actor in a Leading Role in a Musical	Matilda the Musical	Won	
2013	Tony Award	Best Performance by a Leading Actor in a Musical	Matilda the Musical	Nominated	
2013	Drama Desk Award	Outstanding Actor in a Featured Role in a Musical	Matilda the Musical	Won	
2013	Drama League Award	Distinguished Performance	Matilda the Musical	Nominated	
2013	Outer Critics Circle Award	Outstanding Actor in a Leading Role in a Musical	Matilda the Musical	Nominated	
2017	Evening Standard Theatre Award	Best Actor	Ink	Nominated	
2018	Laurence Olivier Award	Best Actor in a Supporting Role in a Play	Ink	Won	
2019	Tony Award	Best Performance by a Featured Actor in a Play	Ink	Won	
2019	Outer Critics Circle Award	Outstanding Actor in a Featured Role in a Play	Ink	Nominated	

=== Television ===
Year	Award	Category	Work	Result	Ref.
2023	Actor Awards	Outstanding Performance by an Ensemble in a Drama Series	The Crown	Nominated	

== See also ==
- List of British actors
