= A Song of Patriotic Prejudice =

Song by Flanders and Swann

from the album At the Drop of Another Hat
- Released: 1964
- Recorded: 2 October 1963
- Venue: Haymarket Theatre
- Genre: Musical revue; comedy song; satirical song
- Length: 2:51
- Label: Parlophone
- Songwriter: Michael Flanders * Donald Swann
- Producer: George Martin

Audio sample
- file; help

"A Song of Patriotic Prejudice" (also known as "The English") is a 1963 comedy song by the musical duo Flanders and Swann. It was a staple of their live tour of England in late 1963 and subsequent international tour, and later released on the album At the Drop of Another Hat.

The song is a satire of contemporary attitudes towards foreigners in the wake of losing the empire, with consequent uncertainty as to the position of the country on the new world. It is virulent against the other nations within the United Kingdom, referencing the common stereotype of the Welsh (as bad singers), the Scottish (as mean) and the Irish (as always trying to blow up the English). It then moves on to other nations, including the Italians and the Greeks (as garlic eaters). Scholars have debated the degree to which the song is a serious critique, but it has found continued currency into the 21st century as a symbol of English nationalism, particularly in the aftermath of Brexit and other social phenomena.

== Background ==
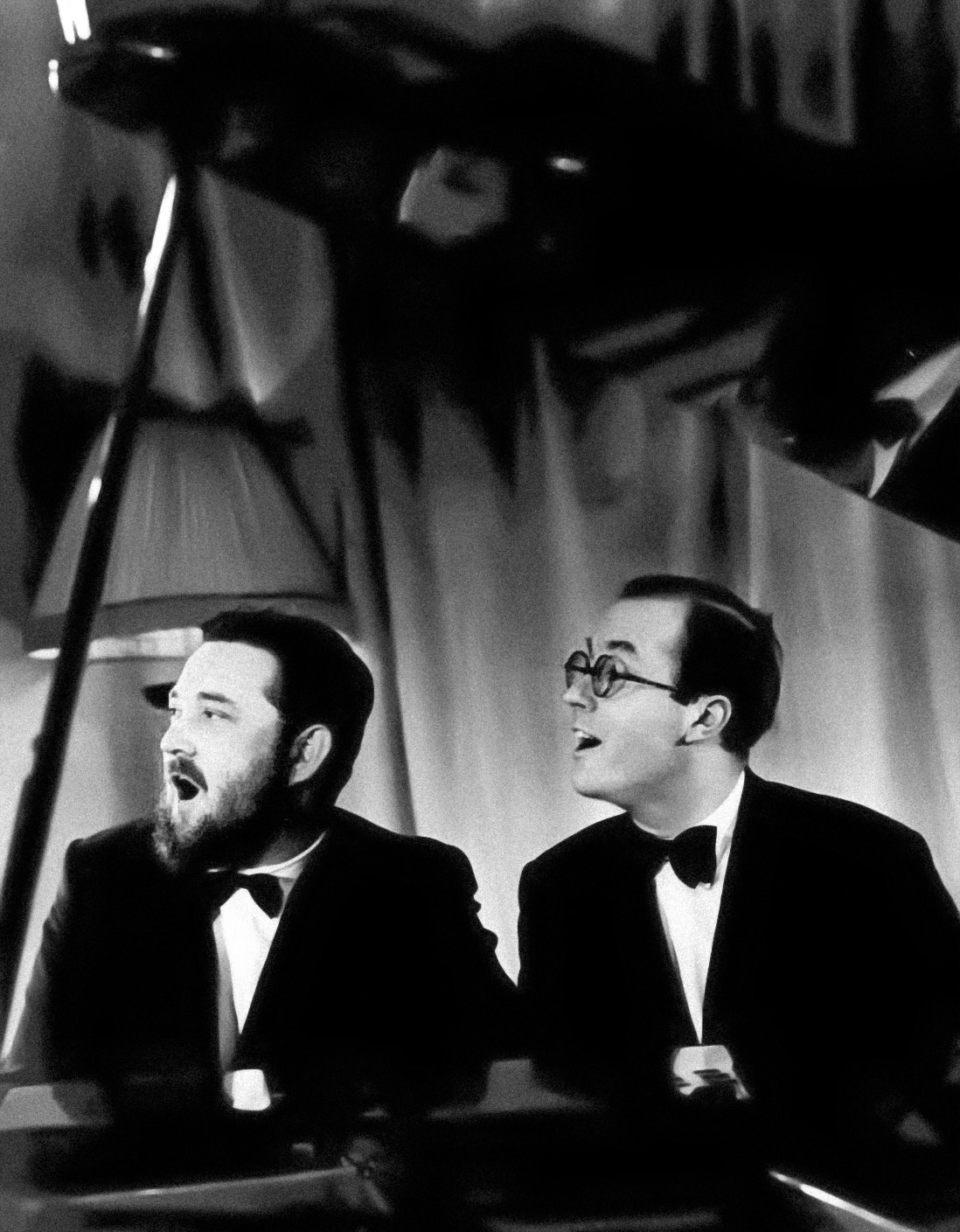
Michael Flanders and Donald Swann performing on the American tour, 14 September 1966, prior to taking the show to Broadway

Michael Flanders (1922–1975) was a lyricist, actor, and singer, and Donald Swann (1923–1994), a composer and pianist, met as children at Westminster School, where they first joined up together for a school revue in 1939. After World War II, they formed a musical partnership—"one of the greatest entertainment partnerships all round"—and wrote over 100 such pieces. Peter Grant suggests that they had a stronger degree of anti-authoritarianism in them than might have been expected. Swann, for example, was a quaker and a pacifist, whose parents had escaped Russia after the 1917 revolution while Flanders had been a campaigner for disability rights since polio had confined him to a wheelchair in 1943.

Between 1956 and 1967, Flanders and Swann performed their songs, interspersed with comic monologues, in their long-running two-man revues At the Drop of a Hat and At the Drop of Another Hat, which they toured in Britain and abroad. The duo also made several studio recordings. Their singalong style was in part derived from the Music Hall although they have been described by the music journalist Paul Du Noyer as a "more subtle and intelligent version ... gently satirical" of that genre. They have been compared, in their use of nonsense, as a musical version of Punch magazine. Swann would play the piano while Flanders recited lyrics from his wheelchair. The social historian David Kynaston has commented that "little was as unashamedly English as A Drop of A Hat".

The song is a "spoof anthem" for England, which has no official national song (Note: The official British national anthem is God Save the King, but it achieved this recognition from custom and common usage rather than statute or decree. England itself has never had an anthem, although William Blake's Jerusalem has often been regarded as a sporting anthem. Since 2000, several parliamentary debates took place regarding codifying its position, and "while there was no guarantee that 'Jerusalem' would have been the winner with the public, had the bill been enacted, it was clearly a front runner exactly ... The government ultimately talked out the bill". For political and historical reasons Northern Ireland has tended to use God Save the King, although in the latter half of the 20th century 'Danny Boy' has become a popular substitute. The other UK countries have unofficial anthems. In Wales, Hen Wlad Fy Nhadau (Land of My Fathers) has been recognised, at least for sporting purposes, as its de facto anthem since the 1970s. Scotland has "no fewer than four possible" anthems.) based on the perception of the British strength of character; that having suffered during the war, "doing without" after it were signs of strength. The historian Victor Bulmer-Thomas suggests Flanders and Swann's song "brilliantly captured" the sense of superiority prevalent in the British imperial mindset. The music historian Graham McCann has, however, noted that Flanders and Swann were politically left-leaning rather than right.

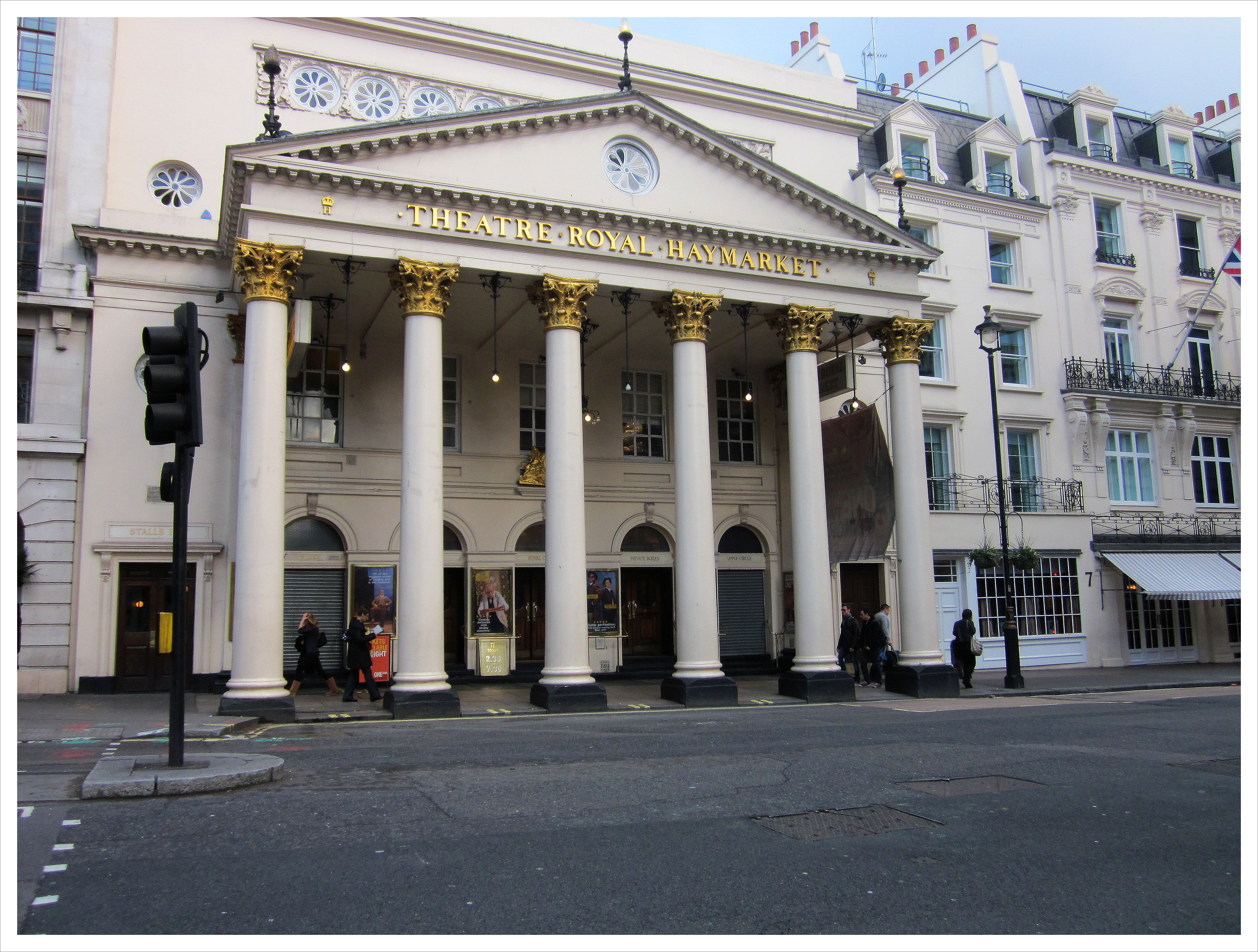
Haymarket Theatre, London, where At the Drop of Another Hat premiered in October 1963

== "A Song of Patriotic Prejudice" ==
The song is based on socio-political tongue-in-cheek humour; McCann suggested that it demonstrates a "witty and wry style of self-deprecation that set the tone for post-war and post-colonial English irony". The song's satirical nature is revealed in its early lines:

The rottenest bits of these islands of ours
We've left in the hands of three unfriendly powers
Examine the Irishman, Welshman or Scot
You'll find he's a stinker, as likely as not.

Flanders and Swann expand on the Scots in another verse:

The Scotsman he's mean as we're all well aware
And bony and blotchy and covered with hair
He eats salty porridge
He works all the day
And he hasn't got bishops to show him the way.

The reference to Scotsmen as being mean was a long-standing stereotype; it went back at least to the accession of James VI to the English throne. The reference to their lack of bishops is a reference to the prevalence of Presbyterianism. Other references include the Welsh as being "more like monkey than man", while the Irish are perpetual rebels. The refrain varies but generally includes the line, "The English, the English, the English are best, I wouldn't give tuppence for all of the rest". Flanders once said that they wrote the song in place of a national song, and suggested that the lack of one was because "we didn't go around saying how marvellous we were. Everybody knew that." (Note: This quotation comes from the monologue that Flanders would introduce the song with live; he suggests that the reason no-one cared about nationalism was that when he young, in the 1920s, "nationalism was on its way out" and that "we'd got pretty much everything we wanted", without it.) The textual scholar David Greetham argues that the song exposes a contemporary mindset of "arrogance and self-deprecation".

=== Construction ===
The Musicologist Dai Griffiths has described "Patriotic Prejudice" as sophisticated in its exhibition of the dominant-tonic juxtaposition when Swann sings the line "he sings far too loud, far too often and flat". Griffiths argues that the music and lyric stand in opposition to each other here, for, while the lyric "flat" suggests a descending note, the tune rises to B major from B♭. Although the song ends on a B key, a brief A chord is heard before the melody is finally resolved.

== Tours and reception ==
In a 1998 PBS documentary, the presenter John Amis explained that "Donald always insisted on doing ["Patriotic Prejudice"]—everywhere". The song was first performed in September 1963 in the At the Drop of Another Hat tour and was a permanent fixture. Performances took place around England, including Bristol, Coventry and Bath, before returning to London on 2 October 1963. Following a successful run at the Theatre Royal Haymarket—during time which Flanders was appointed OBE in the New Year Honours—the duo embarked on a series of international engagements, which combined the new material ("a synthesis of the best") with some from the previous tour of At the Drop of a Hat.

The international leg of the tour started in Australia. Flanders and his family arrived on 1 August; the show opened in Melbourne and passing through Brisbane, Adelaide and Sydney, concluding there on 12 December. The duo and spouses travelled through New Zealand, Hong Kong, Canada—where in Toronto they played their largest audience of 3,400 people— before returning to London "at public demand" on 29 October 1965 where it played at the Globe Theatre. The duo went to the United States It appeared at several cities—Cincinnati and Detroit in October 1966, Philadelphia in November, —before moving to Broadway in New York. Presented by Alexander H. Cohen, it showed at the Booth Theatre revue between 27 December 1966 and 9 April the following year with a total of 105 performances.

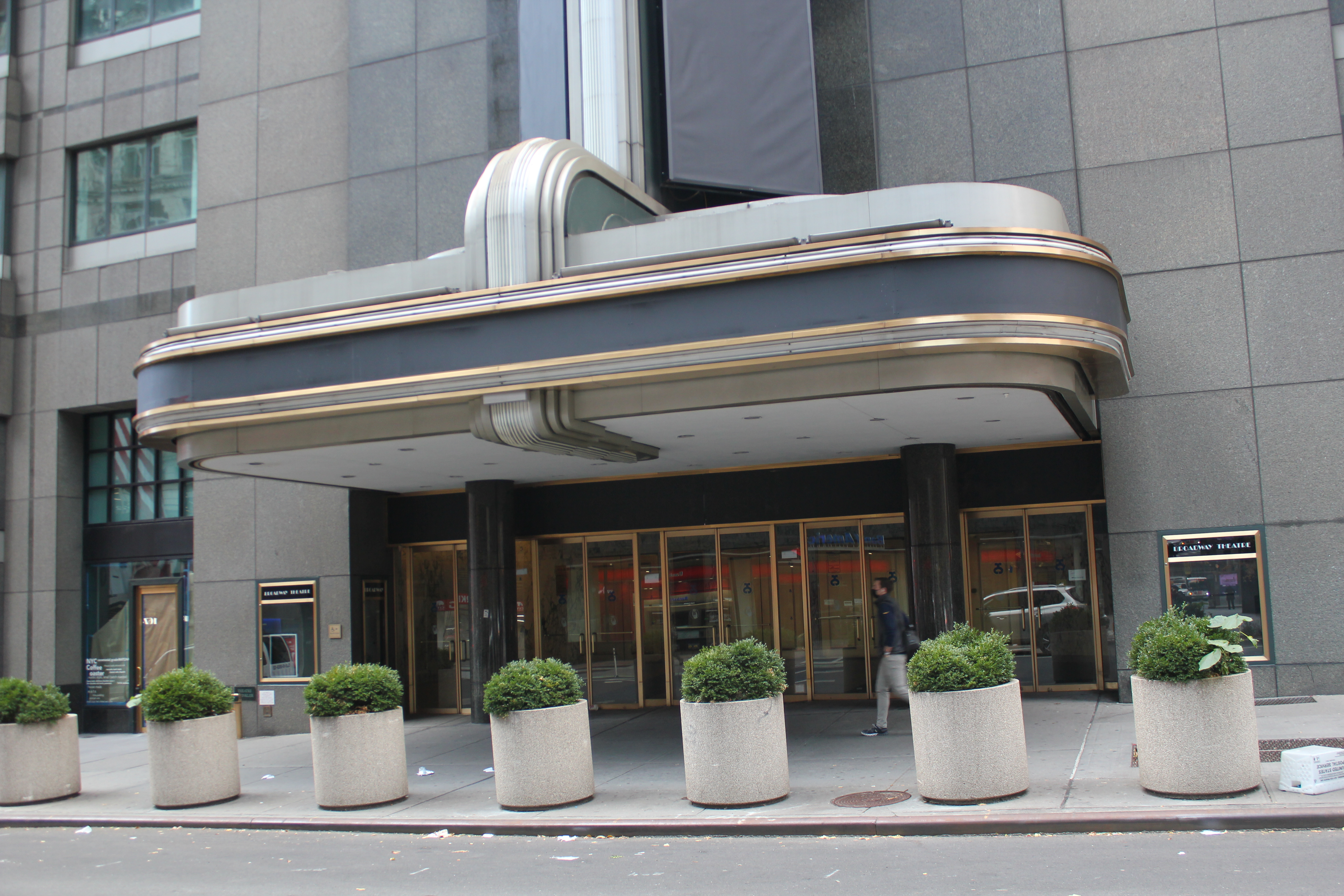
Broadway Theatre, where the revue opened in December 1967

The tour received mix responses from critics. In the opinion of the theatre historian Gerald Bordman, for example, "it suffered the fate of most sequels, falling far short of the vogue of the original", although Flanders' biographer, Michael Meyer argues it was as successful as its predecessor. The Corpus Christi Caller-Times highlighted the differences between the use of American English during the US tours, in contrast to the British English that Americans had already heard on the pair's live album, which had been recorded in London. The paper advised its readers seeing the show that they might "hear a remark or two that is rough on the United States", as a song such as "Patriotic Prejudice" was "calculated to set the jingoists aflame". (Note: The same review, by R. Marsh, also compared the mildness of Flanders and Swann's anti-American remarks to those they make about, for example, France: "There's a De Gaulle song that should take care of Anglo-French relations for the next few years". Marsh's article seems to have been syndicated from the Chicago Sun-Times.) The New York Times' critic wrote that the duo were particularly welcome following the British Invasion, with America "having been exposed to so many of Britain's angry young men. It's very comforting to get back to Flanders and Swann again. They're not angry, they're just a bit put out." Billboard called them "bright Britishers who can make their way with the Yanks, too".

The song was recorded at the Haymarket and released on the At The Drop of Another Hat album. It was produced at Abbey Road Studios by Parlophone's George Martin and classified as PMC-1216. The last night on Broadway was filmed in colour television and edited down into a one-hour CBS program for later broadcast. The producer Jacqueline Babbin told reporters that "the too special and too British will be cut" for the American audience.

== Analysis ==
Flanders stated that the song opened with "typical English understatement". Ian Bradley has argued that the song belongs to a long line of English patriotic satire going back at least to the work of Gilbert and Sullivan. A song in their H.M.S. Pinafore, for example, 'He is an Englishman', is a piece of fervent mock-patriotism. Other Savoy operas continue in a similar vein: Iolanthe's 'When Britain Really Ruled the Waves' and 'The Darned Mounseer' ('I shipped, d'ye see') from Ruddigore, which contains mock-anti-French sentiment, 'A British Tar Is a Soaring Soul', also from Pinafore, and 'There's a Little group of isles beyond the Wave' from Utopia, Limited.

Cultural historian Jeffrey Richards suggests that a leading theme with Gilbert and Sullivan songs is that they begin as gentle satires, but gradually lose that quality and end up as purely celebratory, as, seemingly, does "Patriotic Prejudice" (with its closing "blithe assumption" regarding the English being "the best"), In a slightly different vein, the textual scholar David Greetham has placed it within the same tradition as Sellar's and Yeatman's 1930 tongue-in-cheek retelling of history, 1066 and All That. In both 1066 and in "A Song of Patriotic Prejudice", there is a clear distinction of "them and us", a bipolar sense that, even if Britain's physical superiority had declined, its sense of moral superiority was at full power. McCann suggests that this is Flanders and Swann "teasing" their audience—i.e., the English—about their self-view compared to their views of their neighbours. Neuburger argues that the lyrics are "based on a significant truth", that is, that the English often do see themselves as simply different to foreigners ("and, by 'foreigners' they primarily mean Europeans").

One line—which, to Owen Dudley Edwards, "grazes nearer the bone" in the 21 century—reflects on the numerous organisations created within the Irish diaspora, such as Fenian Brotherhood who Flanders and Swann suggest have taken their bitterness towards Britain and the Empire with them. In the song, the Irishman "blows up policemen, or so I have heard / And blames it on Cromwell and William the Third". This hostility was due to several factors, but mainly the famine of 1845–1852, which had already resulted in agitation and rebellion. The historian Ruth Dudley Edwards considers it acceptable in light of the atrocities being carried against the English. She argues that while, in the late 20th century, lines such as this would have got the song banned "in the London Borough of Camden, now officially an Irish Joke Free Zone", this is "a pity for it is surely healthy that the English should have the safety valve of laughing at the incomprehensible Paddy". She highlights how Flanders and Swann focus on a perceived Irish trait taking "history personally" by either hagiogrophising or condemning historical figures in the context of contemporary politics.

However, the music is "clearly utterly comedic" and so reveals the song's humor despite the ambiguity of the lyrics. Smith and Overy note that because the lyrics are subject to personal interpretation, the song could still be at the expense of "Johnny Foreigner" to those of a nationalist outlook. (Note: A similar example in British popular culture, suggests Smith and Ovary, might be that of Warren Mitchell. Although himself a "staunch socialist" and anti-fascist, Mitchell used his role as Alf Garnett—a "ranting, right-wing Wapping dock worker"—to lampoon the prejudices of the Little Englander by exposing them as "misogynistic, racist, commie-hating, reactionar[ies]".) The historian Owen Dudley Edwards has argued that nationalism is not automatically good or bad, or black and white (which would "define a blank page by colourings it does not have"). and as such it is impossible to tell—as "Patriotic Prejudice" shows—whether basic bigotry or a more complex self-mocking. The song gently "mocks the English themselves" insofar as they still believe the stereotypes. For example, during live performances, it was the abuse directed at foreigners, says Bulmer-Thomas, that drew the greatest laughter from English audiences. It is not always clear, says classicist Thomas Harrison, regarding stereotypes such as "Greeks and Italians eat garlic in bed", whether "such phrases should be seen as literal or figurative". The psychologist Mary Stopes-Roe, with Raymond Cochrane, has argued while such xenophobic sentiment might be "laughable", its foundations were in the popular attitudes formed over the previous few hundred years, the years of Empire.

The simple stereotypes used in the song—based as they were on cultural, political and economic differences—would have been immediately recognisable to the audience, with, say Payne and Shardlow, "even viler calumnies, extending to the people of the whole world, who even argue with umpires!" The view of the English Flanders and Swann present would have resonated with their audience, as it also reveals other qualities, such as "just authority, restraint, amateurishness and 'playing the game'". The song's satire was founded on the audience's self-recognition, or a perception of the truth if not the truth itself. This form of Englishness has been described by Jeffrey Richards as "serene in [its] self-confidence, firmly believing that God is on their side". However, Peter Grant has also argued that while jingoism may have been the main trait of the English the song explores, another is the ability to laugh at oneself, in the spirit of J. B. Priestley's adage on English self-deprecation, that they "laugh at those [they] love". In this light, it has been called by Ronald L. Smith a "frolicsome ethnic atrocity".

Professor Paul Ellingworth considers the prejudice represented in the song to be present beyond the English, noting that "in an increasingly nationalist Scotland ... during an Iran vs England football match it is the Saddamites who would be cheered. He notes, however, that other nationalisms have helped eradicate that of Flanders and Swann's song from his personal outlook. Regarding a sense of Englishness, the political historian Jenny Wormald has used the song as an accurate portrayal of the Early Stuart House of Commons basic political view, and the new, and different, foreign—especially Scottish—theories of kingship that James I brought with him. Wormald says between the two was a "deep, and probably unbridgeable ideological gulf".

== Modern relevance ==
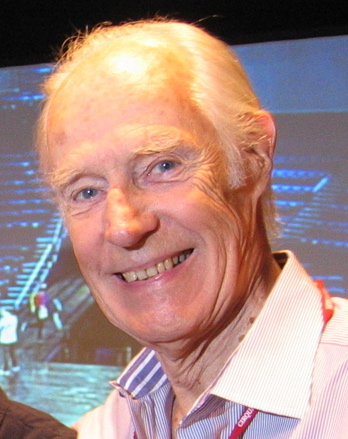
George Martin, producer of At the Drop of Another Hat seen in 2006

Lord Neuburger suggests that Flanders and Swann were "at the gentler end" of contemporary satire (compared, for example, to That Was the Week that Was or Beyond the Fringe). The academic Peter Grant has argued that:

If Michael Flanders and Donald Swann are remembered in Britain at all, it is as very old-fashioned humorists who went out of style as soon as the 1960s wave of modern satirists appeared in the wake of Beyond the Fringe.

He suggests, however, that this view does the duo a disservice and fails to recognise the degree to which their songs were "incisive and radical", particularly in the context of the time. Indeed, they continue, "few people would identify Flanders and Swann as having produced the first British anti-Vietnam war song". (Note: This was the 1967 single 'Twenty Tons of TNT', the B-side to 'The War Of 14–18' (Capitol Records, P5884). The latter was a version of Georges Brassens' original French song, satirising World War One—"the greatest human slaughterhouse in human history"—as an "ideal war".) The song "seriously challenges" the notion that the duo could write only gentle, pastoral tunes "about slow driving trains or silly ones about gnus". (Note: Referring to, respectively, 1963's 'Slow Train' and The Gnu.)

The song has been identified as relevant to 21st-century political culture. The sociologists Malcolm Payne and Steven Shardlow have suggested that satirical, comedic rivalry such as that of "Patriotic Prejudice" stems from real life historical dissension and discord. Discussing the nature of Englishness, Dr Christine Berberich has suggested that the English were sufficiently confident in their identity that they subsumed their island neighbours into their culture. This was achieved successfully enough that "many foreign nations refer to England when, in fact, meaning Britain", and Berberich comments that in doing so they demonstrated the song's maxim. The psychoanalysts Kenneth Smith and Stephen Overy have argued that it was "relatable to the political climate", comparing the song to the work of rap artist Mickey Avalon (Note: Containing lyrics such as: I wish you woke motherfuckers would go back to sleep. It's retarded how you fags be so PC. I wish you woke motherfuckers would go back to bed. And take a plastic bag and tie it over your head.) as also being a "hostile joke". The song makes numerous allusions to the supposed negative characteristics of foreigners. The first three verses address the Scotsman, Irishman and Welshman before moving on to Europe. There, Russians are "red", Italians and Greeks are alleged to commit the offence of "eating garlic in bed". Flanders and Swann consider it sufficient to call the Germans, simply German.

The political scientist Colin Flint comments that, having heard the song as a child, while it was superficially "family fun", it needless to say "just happened to instil a belief that [Flint's] country was obviously superior to any other". Flint goes on to argue that the humour in "Patriotic Prejudice" effectively laid the basis for a geopolitical perspective of Britain's role in the world even after the war, "using force if necessary". England is personified by the land of cricket—in its reference to umpires; the Conservative peer, Lord Tebbit argued less than 30 years later, that the likelihood of immigrants assimilating British values could be judged on their loyalty to the England cricket team. Thus is the English jingoist exposed in the lyrics; it satirises national pride, highlighting how close to prejudice this could be. The authors, drawing their discussion of the song onto the present, argue that it "makes for difficult listening" since the UK voted to leave the European Union—and alongside, McCann argues, resurgent Scottish nationalism—because this, in turn, has made the breakup of the UK more, rather than less, likely. Neuburger also argues that the English "somewhat singular" attitude to others the song iterates is reflected in contemporary political debate, particularly with regard to the European Union.

In 1994 the British Treasury investigated how much the constituent countries of the union received and how equal, pro rata, this was. Among their results were that Scotland and Northern Ireland received "excess" of what they needed and to what England drew. This was resisted by the Scottish Office, at least one of whose officials considered the Treasury to be blinkered by nationalism. The economic historian Julian Hoppit, notes that the Treasury's attitude "was summed up, for one Scottish civil servant at least" by "Patriotic Prejudice". Patrick Cockburn, writing in The Independent, suggested that the aggressive nationalism the song expresses could be compared to the then-political zeitgeist of "British ministers appear[ing] on television engulfed in union jacks, like so many third world despots". Similarly, BBC Home Affairs Editor Mark Easton comments in his book, Islands: Searching for truth on the shoreline, that he was reminded of the song at Heathrow Airport and saw an advertisement for then-Prime Minister David Cameron's promotional campaign, "Britain Is Great" before the 2012 Olympics. The line—"It's knowing they're foreign that makes them so mad!"–lead Easton to consider that "nationalism is social identity theory at work, exaggerating a sense of the in-groups distinct qualities while often casting the out-group in a poor light".

The late 20th-century comedy duo Armstrong and Miller parodied Flanders and Swann songs under the names Donald Brabbins and Teddy Fyffe in which the former, played by Alexander Armstrong is "rolling about in his wheelchair", and the latter, played by Ben Miller sits "giggling at his piano". McCann describes them, in their interpretation of Flanders and Swann, as "two rather posh comedians play[ing] two rather posh comedians ... singing right-wing-sounding songs whilst being laughed at by rather posh-sounding studio audiences".
