= Have Some Madeira M'Dear =

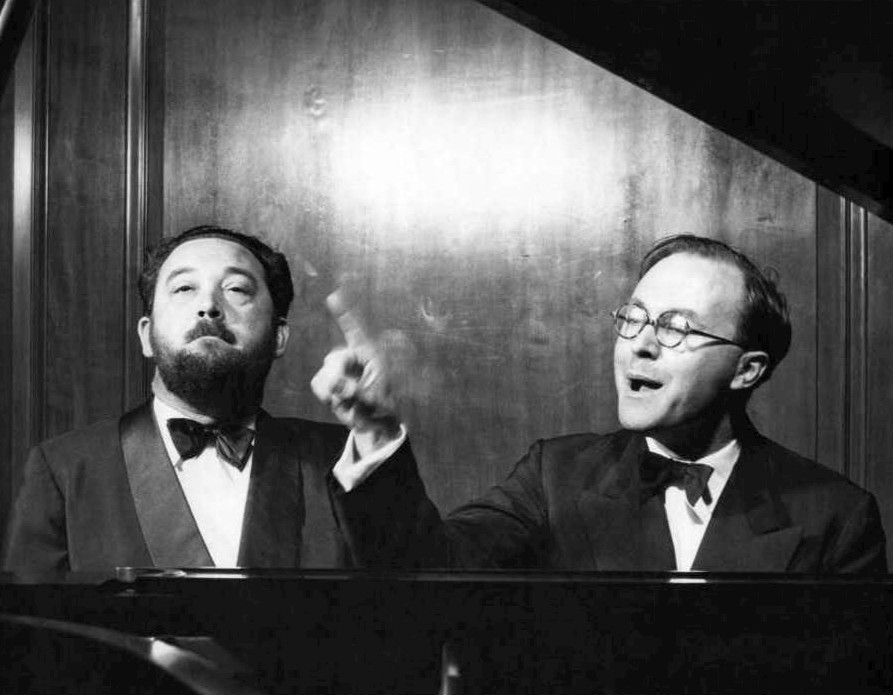
- Writers Michael Flanders and Donald Swann

Song by Flanders and Swann
- Genre: Novelty song
- Composer: Donald Swann
- Lyricist: Michael Flanders

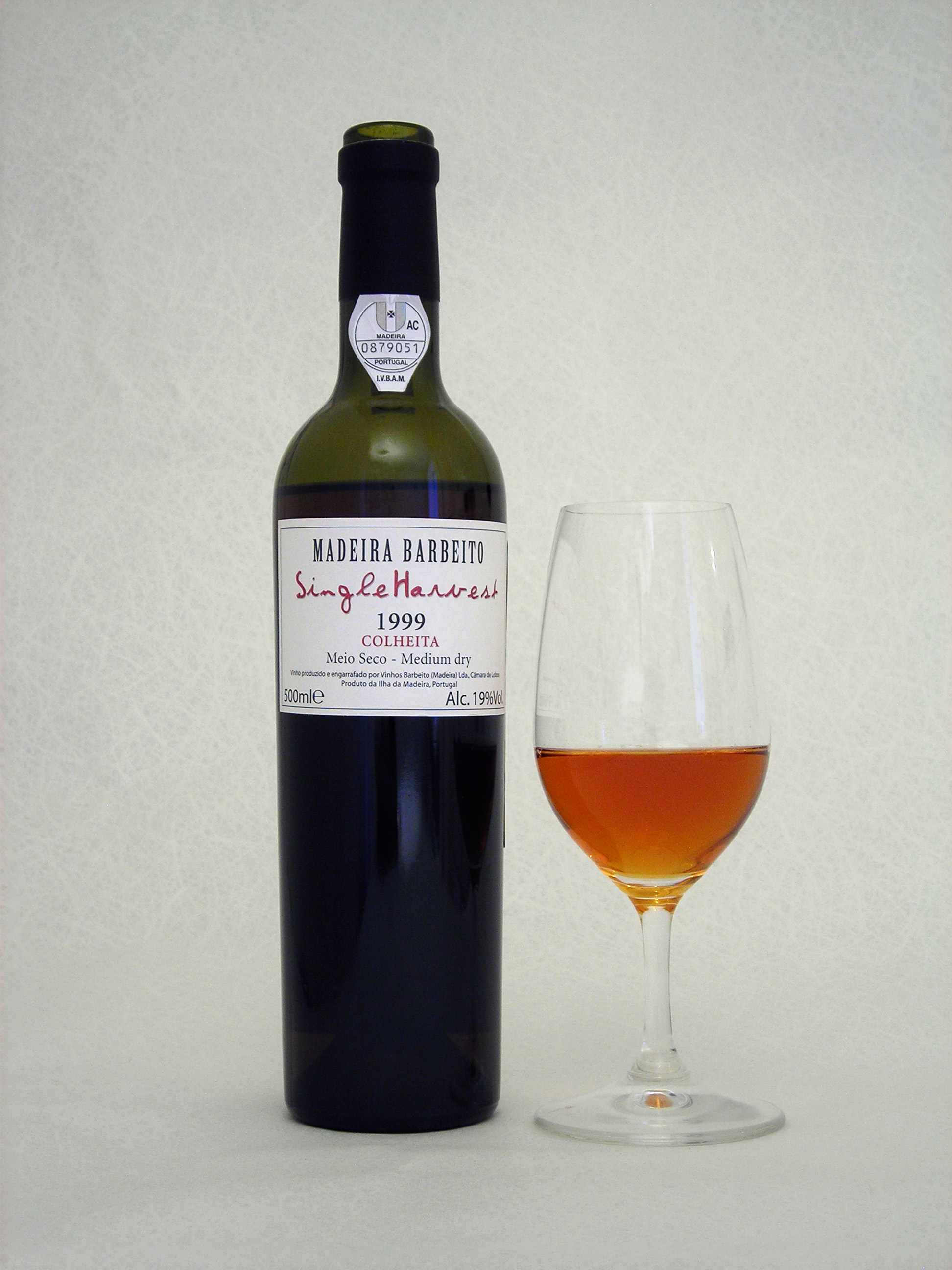
Madeira wine

"Have Some Madeira M'Dear", also titled "Madeira, M'Dear?", (Note: The shorter title is used on the original LP records of the show; the longer is adopted in the 1977 collected songs of Flanders and Swann, edited by Flanders's widow Claudia.) is a darkly comic song by Flanders and Swann.

The lyrics tell of an elderly rake who "slyly inveigles" an attractive girl of 17 to his flat to view his collection of stamps, where he offers her a glass of Madeira, a fortified Portuguese wine. The girl enthusiastically drains her glass, becoming slightly drunk in the process. Sensing victory, he offers her another glass, which she accepts. However, before raising it to her lips, she recalls her dying mother's warning to avoid red wine. With a cry, the girl drops the glass and flees the apartment, the old roué's pleas for her to remain echoing in her ears. The following morning, however, she wakes in bed with a hangover and a beard tickling her ear.

The song contains three much-quoted instances of syllepsis:

- And he said as he hastened to put out the cat, the wine, his cigar and the lamps
- She lowered her standards by raising her glass, her courage, her eyes and his hopes
- She made no reply, up her mind and a dash for the door.

The lyrics were recited as a poem by Tony Randall in episode #922 of The Carol Burnett Show, which first aired February 21, 1976.
