= The Gnu =

1956 humorous song by Flanders and Swann

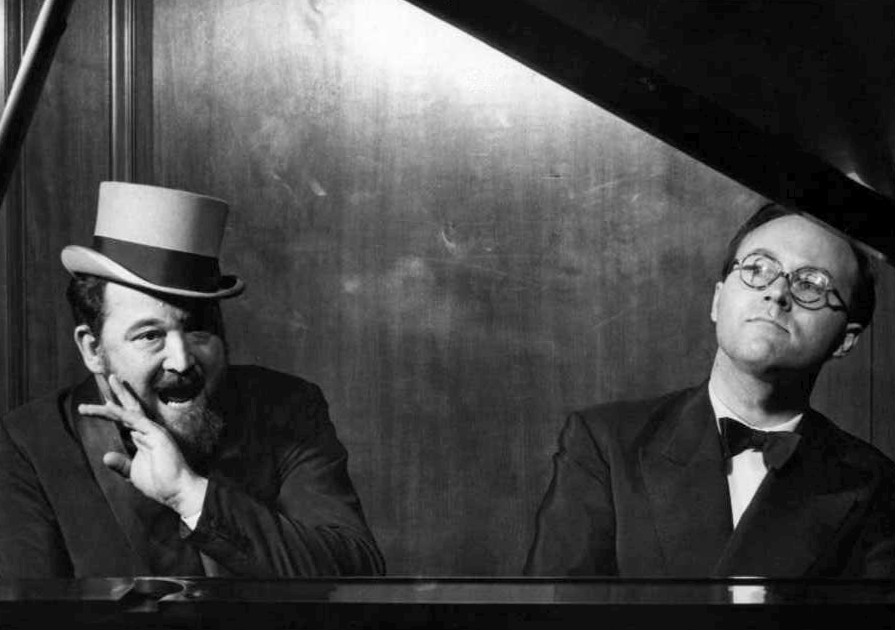
- Writers Flanders and Swann

Song by Flanders and Swann
- Genre: Novelty song
- Composer: Donald Swann
- Lyricist: Michael Flanders

"The Gnu" (sometimes known as "A Gnu", "I'm a Gnu" or "The Gnu Song") is a 1956 humorous song about a talking gnu by Flanders and Swann.

The word gnu is consistently pronounced in the song with two syllables as "g-noo" (/ɡəˈnuː/), with the g clearly enunciated with an additional schwa, and the n unpalatalised, in contrast to the traditional "noo" (/nuː/) or "nyoo" (/njuː/). The song also plays on silent letters in other words such as "k-now" (/kəˈnoʊ/) and "w-ho" (/wəˈhuː/), and adds initial g's to various words beginning with n.

== Synopsis ==
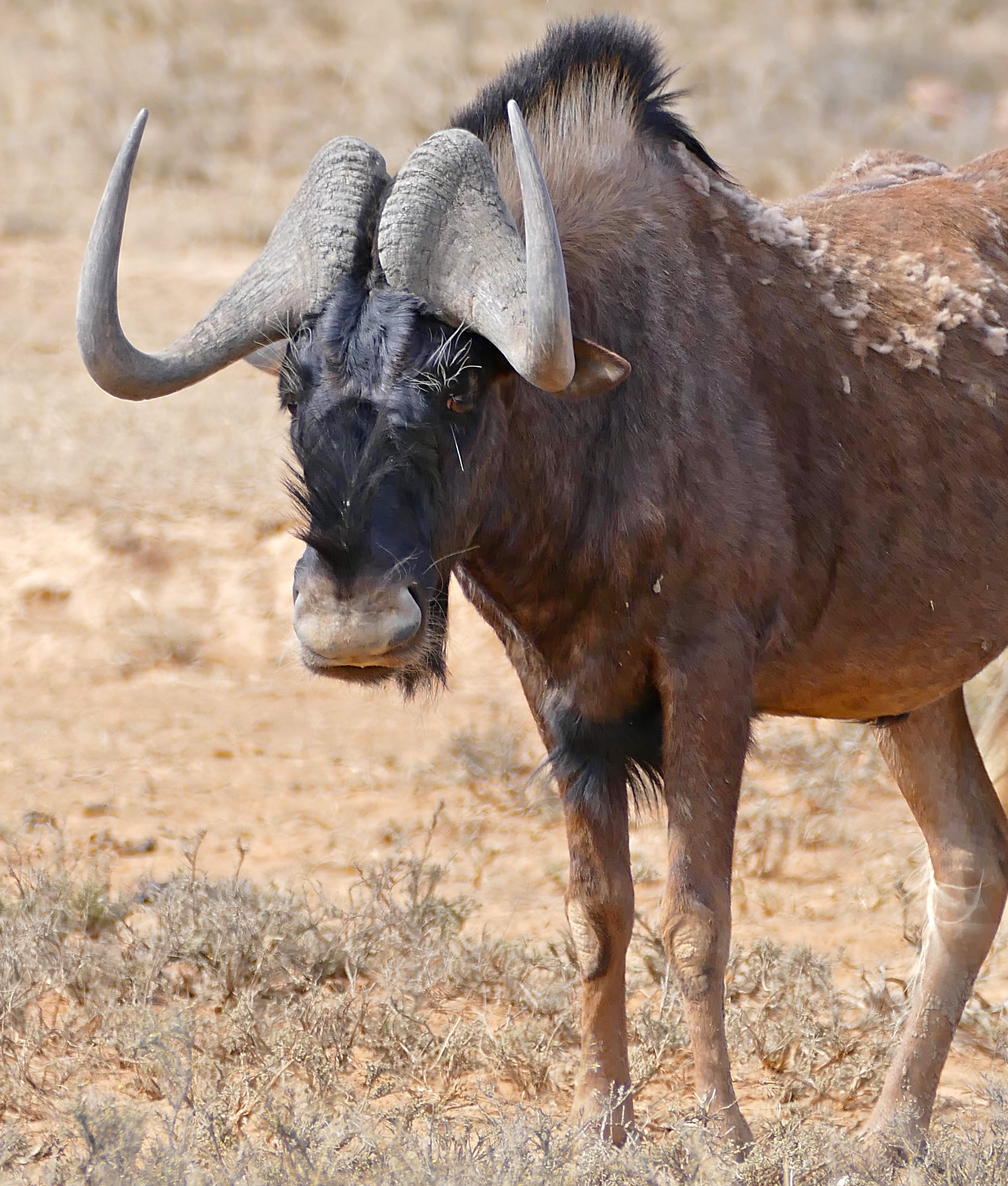
A gnu

Michael Flanders introduces the piece with a humorous monologue explaining how he came to write it. He tells the story of a car – "great big flashy thing, with teeth; engine at both ends" – that is the bane of his existence, since it constantly occupies the one spot in the road outside his house where he can comfortably get from wheelchair to car and vice versa. The licence number, he explains, is 346 GNU. (There is some artistic licence here, as registration plates using "GNU" in "reverse" format would not in fact be issued until 1958.) The song itself then begins and consists of a brief piano introduction and two similar sung verses, each preceded by a verse spoken by Flanders. Donald Swann accompanies Flanders on the piano, but neither speaks nor sings during the song.

In the first verse, the singer is at the zoo when he meets a man who claims to know all the animals (like the habits of baboons and the number of quills on a porcupine), but when asked to identify the creature next to him, he answers that it's a "helk"; the animal corrects him that he is a gnu, further affirming that he is not a camel or a kangaroo, neither man or moose. In the second verse, the singer has taken furnished lodgings, and wakes up in the night to see a stuffed hunting trophy above his bed; he is trying to decide whether the animal's head could be a bison, an okapi or a hartebeest, when he seems to hear a voice, asserting indignantly that it is "a-g-nother gnu" and threatening to sue for its misidentification.

== Recordings ==
Flanders and Swann first performed and recorded this song in their revue At the Drop of a Hat, which opened on 31 December 1956. It was released as a single on the Parlophone label in 1957 under the title "A Gnu" and produced by future Beatles producer George Martin.

== Legacy ==
The jocular mispronunciation of "g-noo" in the song has led, through familiarity, to this becoming a widespread pronunciation of the word "gnu" in British English. The Longman Pronunciation Dictionary seems to suggest this has tainted the word itself. It says the pronunciations beginning "in g- are jocular, as indeed is the whole word: in serious discourse this animal is known as a wildebeest".

Richard Stallman mentions "The Gnu" in connection with the naming of the GNU project in a 2002 interview.

== In popular culture ==
- The song is performed by a gnu and some British Whatnots in episode 519 of The Muppet Show (with guest Chris Langham).
- John Lithgow has a recording of the song on his album Singin' in the Bathtub.
- The song was the basis of the character Gary Gnu from The Great Space Coaster. Gary performed the song on one episode of the show.
- The song was adapted (with changed lyrics) for a series of 1970s animated TV adverts for Typhoo tea, featuring an anthropomorphic gnu, with the tagline "For the tea that picks you up, pick up Typhoo".
- Scottish-Australian rock singer Jimmy Barnes was inspired by this song to write and record a different song, "I'm a G'Nu", for his Och Aye the G'nu children's album.
