= Text (literary theory) =

Object that can be "read"

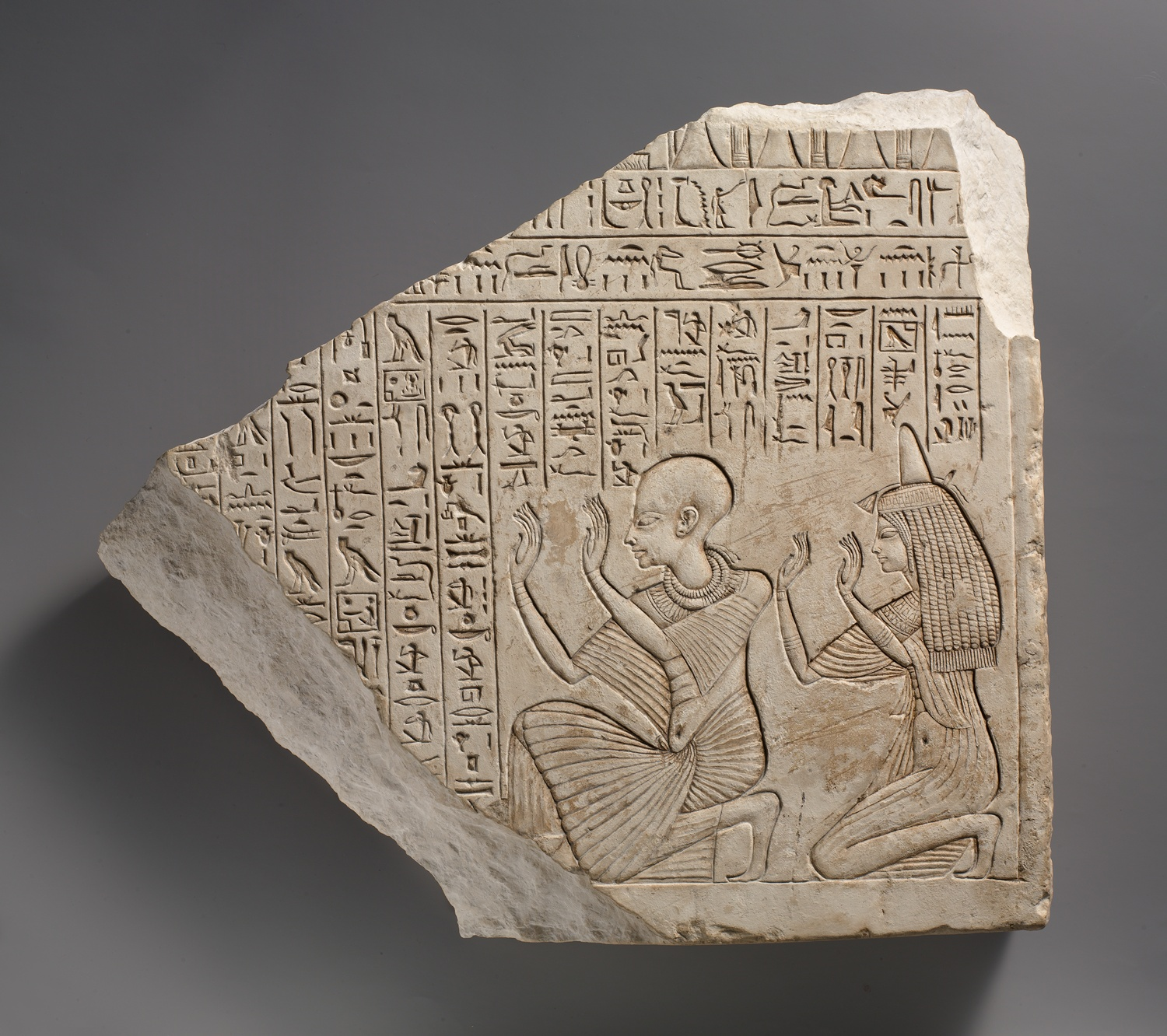
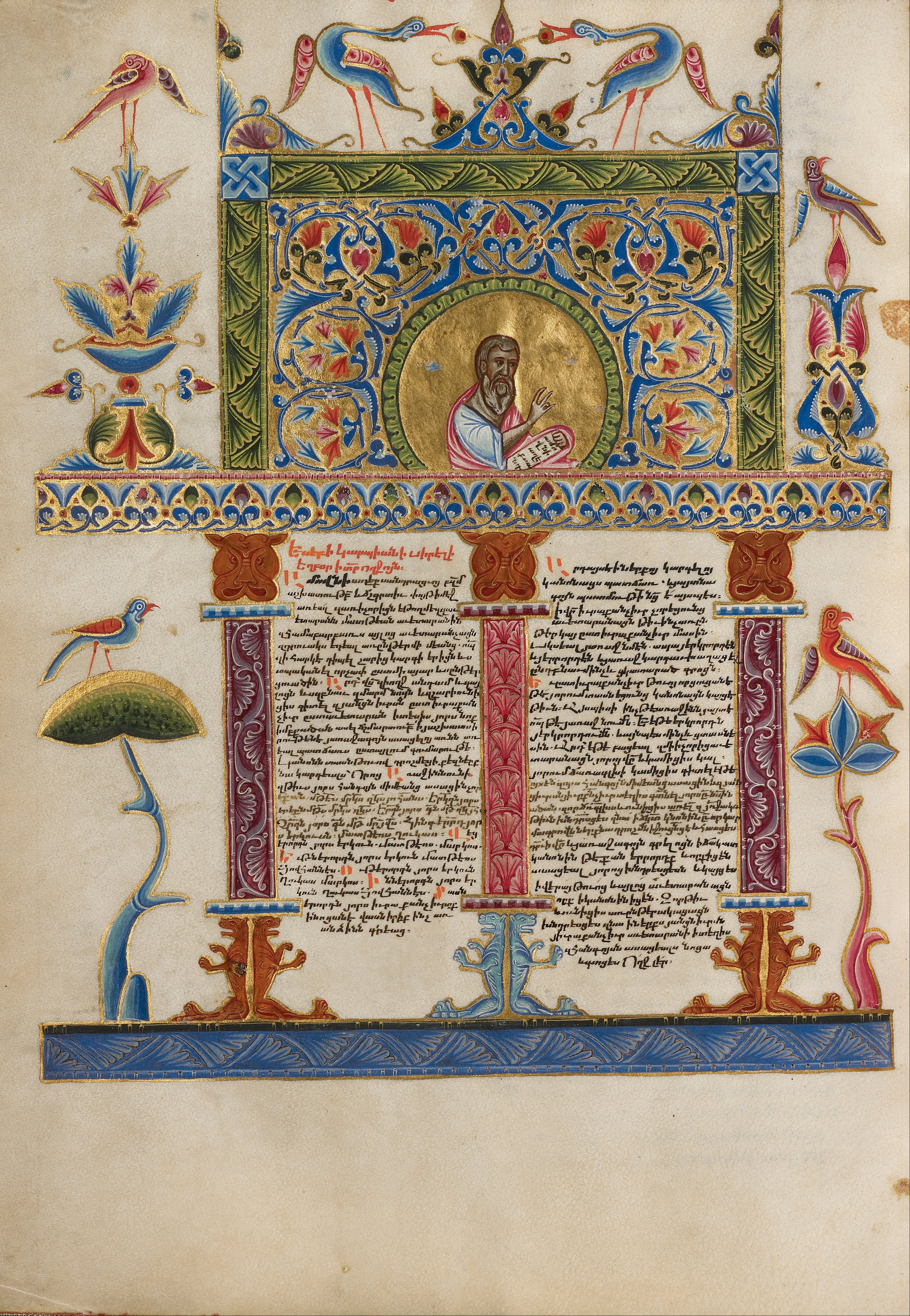
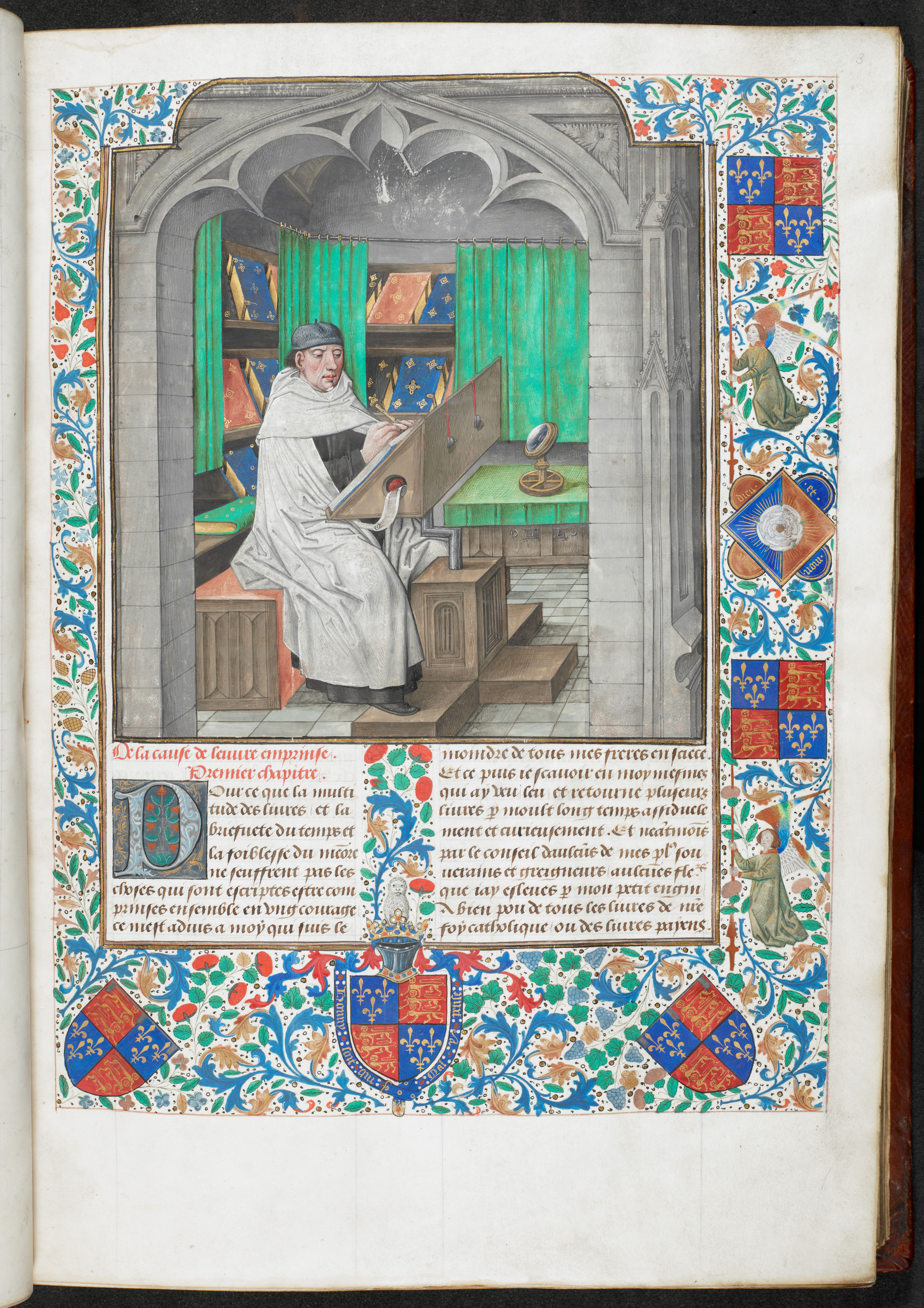
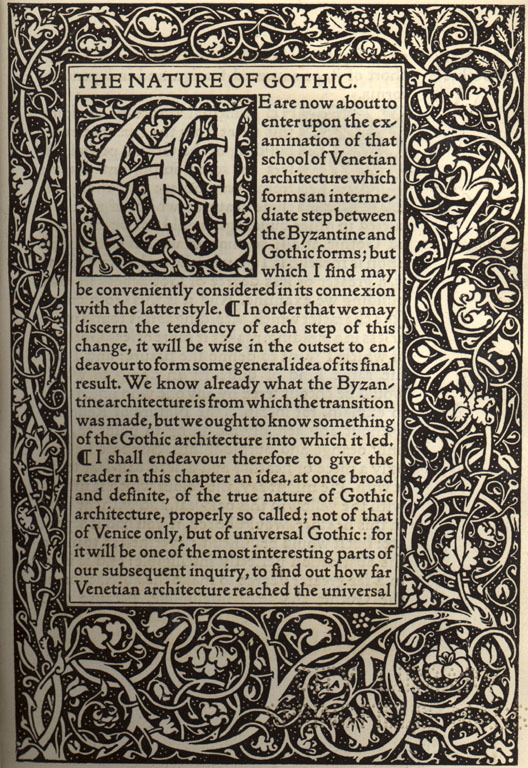
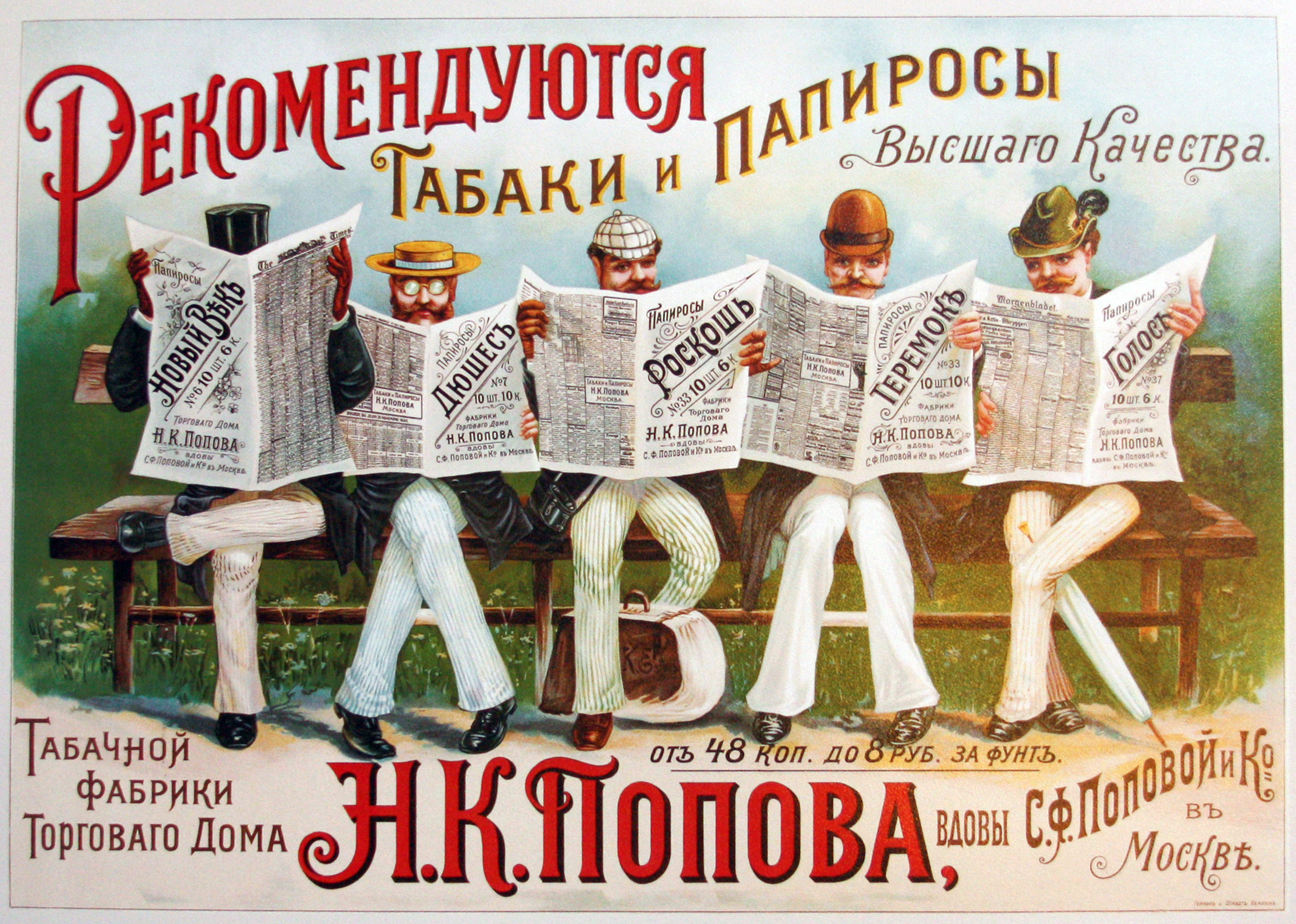
Various examples of texts in different languages

In literary theory, a text is any object that can be read, literally or figuratively, whether this object is a work of literature, a street sign, an arrangement of buildings on a city block, or styles of clothing. It is a set of signs that is available to be reconstructed by a reader (or observer) if sufficient interpretants are available. This set of signs is considered in terms of the informative message's content, rather than in terms of its physical form or the medium in which it is represented.

Within the field of literary criticism, "text" also refers to the original information content of a particular piece of writing; that is, the "text" of a work is that primal symbolic arrangement of letters as originally composed, apart from later alterations, deterioration, commentary, translations, paratext, etc. Therefore, when literary criticism is concerned with the determination of a "text", it is concerned with the distinguishing of the original information content from whatever has been added to or subtracted from that content as it appears in a given textual document (that is, a physical representation of text).

Since the history of writing predates the concept of the "text", most texts were not written with this concept in mind. Most written works fall within a narrow range of the types described by text theory. The concept of "text" becomes relevant if and when a "coherent written message is completed and needs to be referred to independently of the circumstances in which it was created."

== Etymology ==
The word text has its origins in Quintilian's Institutio Oratoria, which contains the statement that "after you have chosen your words, they must be weaved together into a fine and delicate fabric", where the Latin word for "fabric" is textum.

== Uses of the term for analysis of work practice ==
Relying on literary theory, the notion of text has been used to analyse contemporary work practices. For example, Christensen (2016) rely on the concept of text for the analysis of work practice at a hospital.

== See also ==
- Text linguistics
- Textual criticism
- Textual scholarship
- Theme (narrative)
