= Flanders and Swann =

British comedy duo, active 1956–1967

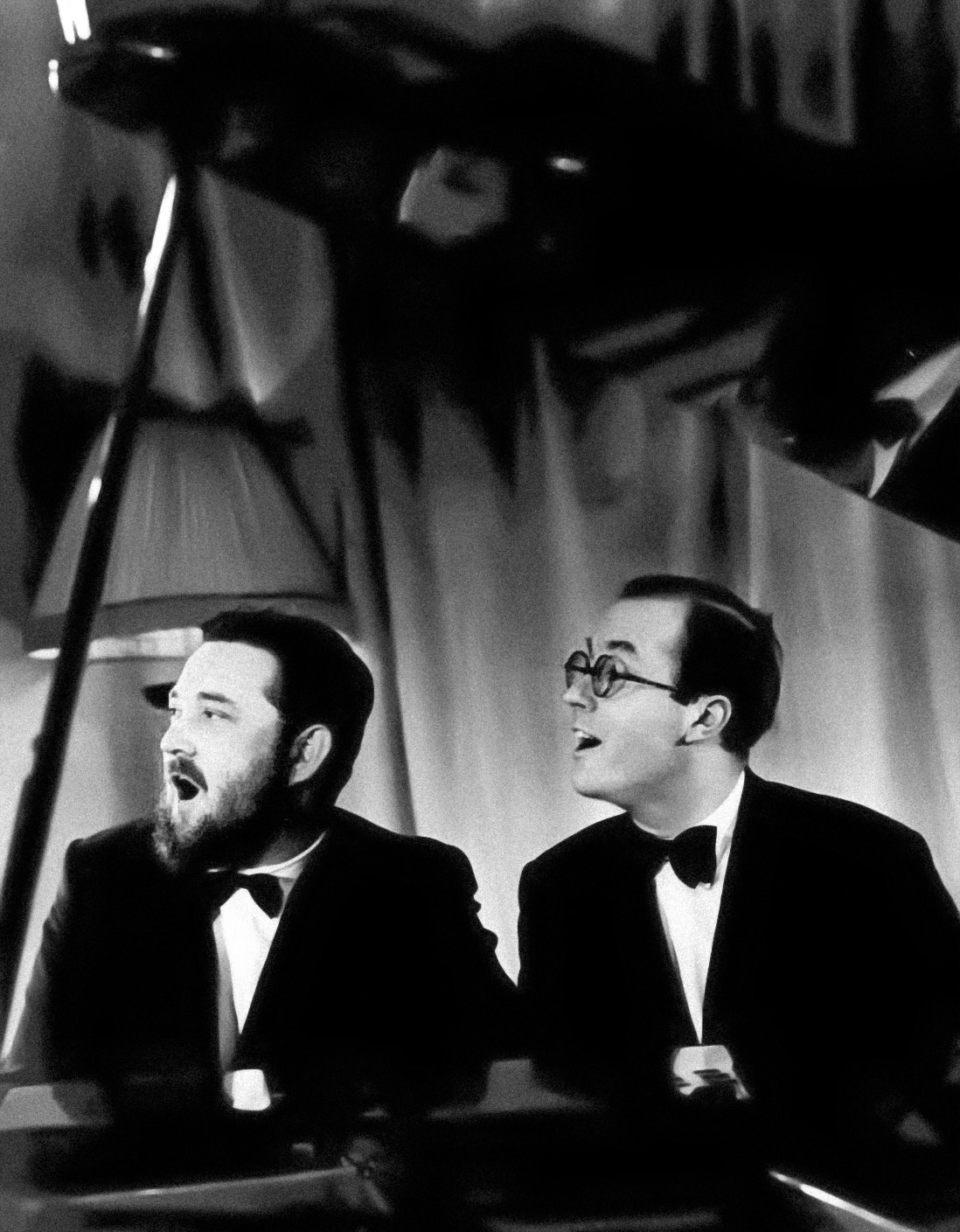
- Flanders (left) and Swann in 1966

Background information
- Origin: Westminster School
- Genres: Comedic songs
- Years active: 1956–1967
- Labels: Parlophone, Angel
- Members: Michael Flanders; Donald Swann

Flanders and Swann were a British comedy duo and musicians. Michael Flanders (1922–1975) was a lyricist, actor and singer. He collaborated with Donald Swann (1923–1994), a composer and pianist, in writing and performing comic songs. They first worked together in a school revue in 1939 and eventually wrote more than 100 comic songs together.

Flanders and Swann performed their songs, interspersed with comic monologues, in their long-running two-man revues At the Drop of a Hat (1956–1959) and At the Drop of Another Hat (1963–1967), which they toured in Britain and abroad. Both revues were recorded in concert (by George Martin). The duo also made several studio recordings.

== Musical partnership ==
Flanders and Swann both attended Westminster School (where in July and August 1940 they staged a revue called Go To It) and Christ Church, Oxford, two institutions linked by ancient tradition. The pair went their separate ways during World War II, but a chance meeting in 1948 led to their forming a musical partnership writing songs and light opera. Flanders provided the words and Swann composed the music. Their songs have been sung by performers such as Ian Wallace and Joyce Grenfell.

In December 1956, Flanders and Swann hired the New Lindsey Theatre, Notting Hill, to perform their two-man revue At the Drop of a Hat, which opened on New Year's Eve. Flanders sang a selection of the songs that they had written, interspersed with comic monologues, accompanied by Swann on the piano. An unusual feature of their act was that both men remained seated for their shows: Swann behind his piano and Flanders in a wheelchair (having contracted poliomyelitis in 1943). The show was successful and transferred the next month to the Fortune Theatre, where it ran for over two years, before touring in the UK, the United States, Canada and Switzerland.

In 1963, Flanders and Swann opened in a second revue, At the Drop of Another Hat, at the Haymarket Theatre. Over the next four years they toured a combination of the two shows in the UK, Australia, New Zealand, Hong Kong, the United States and Canada, before finishing at the Booth Theatre on Broadway in New York City. On 9 April 1967, they performed their last live show together. Ten days later, they moved into a studio theatre and recorded the show for television.

Over the course of 11 years, Flanders and Swann gave nearly 2,000 live performances. Although their performing partnership ended in 1967, they remained friends afterwards and collaborated on occasional projects.

=== Timeline and venues of the revues ===
Date	Venue
1953	Royal Court Theatre, "Airs on a Shoestring"
1954	Saville Theatre, "Pay the Piper"
1956	Comedy Theatre, "Fresh Airs"
1956	New Lindsey Theatre, Notting Hill
1957–59	Fortune Theatre (suspended one month because of Flanders's pneumonia)
1959	Edinburgh Festival "At the Drop of a Kilt"
1959–60	Golden Theatre, New York
1960–61	12-city tour of United States, plus Toronto, Canada
1961	Switzerland
1962	9-city tour of UK, plus Toronto, Canada
1963	9-city tour of UK
1963	Haymarket Theatre
1964	4-city tour of Australia, 5 New Zealand plus Hong Kong
1965	3-city tour of UK
1965	Globe Theatre (now the Gielgud)
1966	9-city tour of USA, plus Toronto
1966–67	New York

== Discography ==
Their records were originally released on the Parlophone label; CD reissues are on EMI.

=== 45s ===
- 1957 – "A Gnu" b/w "Misalliance"

=== EPs ===
- 1957 – More out of the Hat! (EP)
- 1959 – Excerpts from at the Drop of a Hat (EP)
- 1959 – More Excerpts from at the Drop of a Hat (EP)
- 1962 – The Bestiary of Flanders & Swann (EP)
- 1964 – Favourites from at the Drop of Another Hat (EP)
- 1964 – More out of the New Hat (EP)

=== LPs ===
- 1957 – At the Drop of a Hat (Parlophone PMC 1033 mono) (Recorded live at the Fortune Theatre, London, 21 February 1957.
- 1960 – At The Drop Of A Hat (1959 Stereo re-recording) (Parlophone PCS 3001) (Recorded during the final performance at the Fortune Theatre, London, on 2 May 1959. Parlophone's first stereo LP release.)
- 1961 – The Bestiary Of Flanders & Swann Parlophone PMC 1164 (mono)/ PCS 3026 (stereo)
- 1964 – At the Drop of Another Hat (produced by George Martin) Parlophone PMC 1126 (mono) / PCS 3052 (stereo)
- 1975 – And Then We Wrote...
- 1977 – Tried by the Centre Court

=== Cassettes ===
- 1996 – EMI Comedy Classics (Hat and Another Hat on two cassettes)
- 1997 – More out of the Drop of a Hat – Again! (double cassette)

=== CDs ===
- 1991 – The Complete Flanders & Swann (first three albums, in stereo in a boxed set)
- 1994 – A Transport of Delight: The Best of Flanders & Swann
- 1999 – The Flanders and Swann Collection
- 2000 – A Drop of Hilarity from Flanders & Swann
- 2007 – Hat Trick: Flanders & Swann Collector's Edition

== Bibliography ==
- 1977 – Songs of Michael Flanders and Donald Swann (Michael Flanders & Donald Swann, scores)
- 1991 – The Hippopotamus Song: A Muddy Love Story (Michael Flanders & Donald Swann, children's book)

== Videography ==
- 1992 – The Only Flanders & Swann Video (recorded in New York, 19 April 1967, 10 days after the close of At The Drop of Another Hat)
- 1994 – Flanders & Swann - Documentary by John Amis (for BBC2, utilising footage from At The Drop of a Hat recorded at the Haymarket Theatre in 1962, and footage from the above New York performance in 1967)

== Songs ==
Flanders and Swann's songs are characterised by wit, gentle satire, complex rhyming schemes, and memorable choruses. Flanders commented during the recorded performance of At the Drop of Another Hat,

The purpose of satire, it has been rightly said, is to strip off the veneer of comforting illusion and cosy half-truth. And our job, as I see it, is to put it back again.

They wrote over a hundred comic songs together. The following selection gives an indication of their range.

- "All Gall"—a political satire based on the long career of Charles de Gaulle. At the time of writing, de Gaulle had recently vetoed the UK's first application to join the European Economic Community. Sung to the tune of "This Old Man".
- "Bedstead Men", a wry explanation for the rusty bedsteads dumped in ponds and lakes in the UK, including a witty reference to "A Smuggler's Song" by Rudyard Kipling in which "Bedstead Men" are substituted for "Gentlemen".
- "Design for Living"—about contemporary furnishings of houses and gardens. "One day we're taking Liberty's in, the next we're down at Heal's".
- "First and Second Law"—a jazzy setting of the first and second laws of thermodynamics. "Heat is work and work is heat..." "Heat won't pass from a cooler to a hotter / You can try it if you like but you far better notter / Cos the cold in the cooler will get hotter as a ruler..." "Heat is work and work's a curse / And all the heat in the universe / is gonna cool down / because it can't increase / so there'll be no more work / and there'll be perfect peace" / [Swann] "Really?" / [Flanders] "Yeah, that's entropy, man."
- "The Gasman Cometh"—a verse-and-chorus song in which a householder finds that no tradesman ever completes a job without creating another, related job for another tradesman. The melody quotes from "Dashing Away with the Smoothing Iron". The title may have been inspired by that of The Iceman Cometh (1946).
- "The Hippopotamus"—one of Flanders and Swann's best-known songs (because of its memorable chorus, "Mud, mud, glorious mud"), and one of a range of songs that they wrote about different beasts, including:
  - "The Gnu",
  - "The Rhinoceros",
  - "The Warthog" (both with the message that beauty is only skin deep)
  - "The Armadillo".
  - "The Sloth"
  "The Hippopotamus" is among those Ian Wallace included in his repertoire; "The Elephant" was written by Flanders and Swann especially for Ian Wallace, although they also sang it themselves.
- "Ill Wind"—Flanders's words sung to a slightly cut version, with cadenza, of the rondo finale of Mozart's Horn Concerto No. 4 in E flat major, K. 495. It has to be sung since Flanders's French horn was apparently stolen.
- "Rockall" – deriding the British annexation of the island of Rockall in 1955.
- "In The Desert" ("Верблюды", lit. "camels")—a "traditional Russian" song, performed by Donald Swann. He provides an English-language translation after every line. The haunting music and poignant lyrics are undercut by the dry unemotional tone in which Swann gives the translation. Some of the original words are repetitive, rendering parts of the translation redundant.
- "In the D'Oyly Cart"—a satire about the D'Oyly Carte Opera Company. It was first performed in the revue Oranges and Lemons (1948) and revived in Penny Plain (1951). It was included as the first track on Flanders and Swann's 1974 album, And Then We Wrote.
- "Have Some Madeira M'Dear"—an old roué sings to an ingénue about the merits of that wine, hinting that he has seduction in mind, with complex word-play, including three oft-quoted examples of syllepsis.
- "Holimakittiloukachichichi"—another (short) song of implied seduction, this time in the kingdom of Tonga, where the word means "no".
- "Misalliance"—a political allegory concerning a love affair between a honeysuckle and a bindweed.
- "P** P* B**** B** D******" or "Pee Po Belly Bum Drawers"—a song comparing the use of profanity among the intelligentsia to playground swearing.
- "The Reluctant Cannibal"—an argument between father and son, on the topic of cannibalism. (Son: "Eating people is wrong", Father: "Must have been someone he ate"—"he used to be a regular anthropophaguy") The father says you might as well say "Don't fight people" and they agree: "Ridiculous!" (Swann had registered as a conscientious objector during World War II and served with the Friends' Ambulance Unit.)
- "Slow Train"—an elegiac song about the railway stations on lines scheduled for closure by the Beeching Axe in 1963.
- "A Song of Patriotic Prejudice"—a parody of patriotic songs ("The English, the English, the English are best/I wouldn't give tuppence for all of the rest")
- "A Song of Reproduction"—about the then topical mania for do-it-yourself hi-fi as an end in itself. (Making much of the jargon of the hobby: "woofer", "tweeter", "wow on your top", "flutter on your bottom" and in a line added for the stereo remake: "If you raise the ceiling four feet, move the fireplace from that wall to that wall, you'll still only get the stereophonic effect if you sit in the bottom of that cupboard.") The closing verse references singers who were not necessarily in the contemporary public consciousness, Enrico Caruso having died in 1921 - "With a tone control at a single touch/ I can make a Caruso sound like Hutch".
- "A Song of the Weather"—a parody of the 1834 poem "January Brings the Snow" by Sara Coleridge
- "There's a Hole in My Budget", a parody of "There's a Hole in My Bucket" in the form of a dialogue between the then Prime Minister Harold Wilson and the Chancellor of the Exchequer James Callaghan.
- "To Kokoraki" (Το Κοκοράκι, lit. "The Cockerel")—a modern-Greek children's song, something like "Old McDonald Had a Farm", in which a different animal noise is added in each verse. Flanders, feigning impatience with it as Swann sings several more verses than strictly necessary, remarks sarcastically "We must have it in full some night. Alternate it with The Ring Cycle."
- "A Transport of Delight"—with an increasing refrain about the "Big six-wheeler, scarlet-painted, London Transport, diesel-engined, ninety-seven–horse-power omnibus". (The bus was probably the AEC LT-type, which served London from 1929 until the 1950s, and had six wheels instead of the more normal four).
- "20 Tons of TNT"—a song in protest against thermonuclear weapons.
- "The War of 14–18"—a translation of a French song by Georges Brassens, this song celebrates (satirically) World War I.
- "The Whale (Mopy Dick)", which demonstrates Swann's expertise in musical parody: it deftly parodies the style of the English Sea-Song popular in the early 20th century.
- "The Wompom"—a tale about a fictitious all-purpose plant each of whose parts is an excellent raw material of a different kind.
- "Twosome: Kang & Jag" (Kangaroo and Jaguar)—two more animal songs sung as a pair. The title recalls two operas "Cav and Pag" (i.e. Cavalleria rusticana and Pagliacci) which are often performed together.

A very rare song, "Vendor Librorum Floreat" (Let the bookseller flourish), was released as a single in 1960. It was written for the annual American Booksellers Association, the only known time Flanders & Swann accepted a private commission.

== Monologues ==
Flanders's comic monologues include:

- "By Air"—about the vogue for air travel. "I agree with the old lady who said, 'If God had intended us to fly, He would never have given us the railways.'"
- "Tried by the Centre Court"—a parody of the poem "A Subaltern's Love Song" by John Betjeman, about a third-round ladies singles match at Wimbledon, between Miss L. Hammerfest and Miss J. Hunter-Dunn, as related by the bored central umpire. "They are bashing a ball with the gut of a cat".
- "Greensleeves"—about the background to the composition of the famous English air. An annotated version explains all the jokes.
- Los Olividados— a satire on bullfighting, about "the almost unbearable drama of a corrida d'olivas, or festival of olive-stuffing". "A cruel sport: some may think it so. But this is surely more than a sport, this is more than a vital artform. What we have experienced here today is total catharsis, in the acting out of that primeval drama, of man pitted against the olive." The title is a reference to Los Olvidados, or The Forgotten Ones, a 1950 movie by the director Luis Buñuel.
- "Built-up Area"—a prehistoric inhabitant of Salisbury Plain complains about a new development: Stonehenge.

== Homage and parody ==
The British comedy double act Armstrong & Miller have a recurring sketch on The Armstrong and Miller Show in which they parody Flanders and Swann, as Donald Brabbins (Armstrong as Flanders) and Teddy Fyffe (Miller as Swann). The parodies begin like a typical Flanders and Swann performance, but the songs are far more bawdy, often being mock-censored for comedic effect.

British singer-songwriter Frank Turner covered "The Armadillo" on his "Mittens" EP, and "Slow Train" (listed as "The Slow Train") on "The Second Three Years".

== See also ==
- List of songwriter tandems
- List of people educated at Westminster School
