= Zeugma and syllepsis =

Figures of speech

Zeugma (/ˈzjuːɡmə/) is the use of a word to modify or govern two or more words or phrases. The term comes from the Ancient Greek ζεῦγμα, zeûgma, lit. "a yoking together". An example may be "rolling lightning and thunder", where "rolling" is applied to two nouns ("lightning" and "thunder").

Syllepsis (/sɪˈlɛpsɪs/) is a form of zeugma used in such a manner that it applies to each word or phrase in a different sense. It is from the Ancient Greek σύλληψις, súllēpsis, lit. "a taking together") An example may be "she opened the door and her heart to the stray kitten", where "opened" applies in two contrasting senses. A syllepsis may evidence poor usage, or may be used in a humorous or a rhetorical manner.

== Definitions ==
In current usage, there are multiple and sometimes conflicting definitions for zeugma and syllepsis. This article categorizes these two figures of speech into four types, based on four definitions:

=== Type 1 ===
Grammatical syllepsis (sometimes also called zeugma): where a single word is used in relation to two parts of a sentence although grammatically or logically applying to only one.

By definition, grammatical syllepsis will often be grammatically "incorrect" according to traditional grammatical rules. However, such solecisms are sometimes not errors but intentional constructions in which the rules of grammar are bent by necessity or for stylistic effect.

- "He works his work, I mine."

This quote from Alfred Tennyson's poem "Ulysses" is ungrammatical from a grammarian's viewpoint, because "works" does not grammatically agree with "I": the sentence "I works mine" would be ungrammatical. On the other hand, Tennyson's two phrases could be taken to deploy a different figure of speech, namely "ellipsis". The sentence would be taken to mean,

- "He works his work, [and] I [work] mine."

Interpreted in this way, the conjunction is not ungrammatical.

=== Type 2 ===
Zeugma (often also called syllepsis, or semantic syllepsis): a single word is used in two parts of a sentence but must be understood differently in relation to each. Example: "He took his hat and his leave." The type of figure is grammatically correct but creates its effect by seeming, at first hearing, to be incorrect by its exploiting multiple shades of meaning in a single word or phrase.

- "Here Thou, great Anna! whom three Realms obey, / Dost sometimes Counsel take – and sometimes Tea." (Alexander Pope, The Rape of the Lock, Canto III)
- "Miss Bolo [...] went straight home, in a flood of tears and a sedan-chair." (Charles Dickens, The Pickwick Papers, Chapter 35)
- "They sought it with thimbles, they sought it with care; / They pursued it with forks and hope." (Lewis Carroll, "The Hunting of the Snark")
- "And he said as he hastened to put out the cat, the wine, his cigar, and the lamps... She lowered her standards by raising her glass, her courage, her eyes and his hopes... When he asked 'What in heaven?' she made no reply, up her mind, and a dash for the door." (Flanders and Swann, "Have Some Madeira M'Dear")
- "They covered themselves with dust and glory." (Mark Twain, The Adventures of Tom Sawyer).
- "He watches afternoon repeats and the food he eats." (Blur, "Country House")
- "You held your breath and the door for me." (Alanis Morissette, "Head Over Feet")
- "I took the podium and my second trophy of the evening." (Samuel R. Delany, "Racism and Science Fiction")
- "My blood sugar fell dramatically and so did I." (Elaine Stritch, "Elaine Stritch at Liberty")
- "Quand les Français à tête folle / S'en allèrent dans l'Italie, / Ils gagnèrent à l'étourdie / Et Gênes et Naples et la Vérole." (Voltaire)
  "When the scatterbrained French / Off to Italy went, / They gained in their foolishness / Genoa, Naples and the pox."

When the meaning of a verb varies for the nouns following it, there is a standard order for the nouns: the noun first takes the most prototypical or literal meaning of the verb and is followed by the noun or nouns taking the less prototypical or more figurative verb meanings.

- "The boy swallowed milk and kisses," as contrasted with "The boy swallowed kisses and milk".

The opposite process, in which the first noun expresses a figurative meaning and the second a more literal meaning, tends to create a comic effect: "and she feeds me love and tenderness and macaroons." (The Stampeders, "Sweet City Woman")

=== Type 3 ===
The Oxford Dictionary of Literary Terms offers a much broader definition for zeugma, defining it as any case of parallelism and ellipsis working together so that a single word governs two or more parts of a sentence.

- Vicit pudorem libido timorem audacia rationem amentia. (Cicero, Pro Cluentio, VI.15)
  "Lust conquered shame; audacity, fear; madness, reason."

The more usual way of phrasing this would be "Lust conquered shame, audacity conquered fear, and madness conquered reason." The sentence consists of three parallel clauses, called parallel because each has the same word order: verb, object, subject in the original Latin; subject, verb, object in the English translation. The verb "conquered" is a common element in each clause. The zeugma is created in both the original and the translation by removing the second and third instances of "conquered". Removing words that still can be understood by the context of the remaining words is ellipsis.

- Histories make men wise; poets, witty; the mathematics, subtle; natural philosophy, deep; moral, grave; logic and rhetoric, able to contend. (Francis Bacon)

Phrased more pedantically: "Histories make men wise, poets make them witty, mathematics make them subtle, natural philosophy makes them deep, moral [philosophy] makes them grave, and logic and rhetoric make them able to contend." (Because ellipsis involves the omission of words, ambiguities can arise. The sentence could also be read as, "Histories make men wise, make poets witty, make mathematics subtle, make natural philosophy deep, makes moral [philosophy] grave, and make logic and rhetoric able to contend.")

Zeugmas are defined in this sense by Samuel Johnson in his 18th-century Dictionary of the English Language.

=== Type 4 ===
A special case of semantic syllepsis occurs when a word or phrase is used both in its figurative and literal sense at the same time. Then, it is not necessary for the governing phrase to relate to two parts of the sentence. One example is in an advertisement for a transport company: "We go a long way for you." This type of syllepsis operates in a similar manner to a homonymic pun.

== Other types and related figures ==
There are several other definitions of zeugma that encompass other ways in which one word in a sentence can relate to two or more others. Even a simple construction like "this is easy and comprehensible" has been called a "zeugma without complication" because "is" governs both "easy" and "comprehensible".

Specialized figures have been defined to distinguish zeugmas with particular characteristics such as the following figures, which relate to the specific type and location of the governing word:

=== Diazeugma ===
A diazeugma is a zeugma whose only subject governs multiple verbs. A diazeugma whose only subject begins the sentence and controls a series of verbs is a "disjunction" (disiunctio) in the Rhetorica ad Herennium.

- Populus Romanus Numantiam delevit Kartaginem sustulit Corinthum disiecit Fregellas evertit. (Anon. Rhetorica ad Herennium. IV. xxvii.)
  The Roman people destroyed Numantia, razed Carthage, demolished Corinth, and overthrew Fregellae.
- "We shall pay any price, bear any burden, meet any hardship, support any friend, oppose any foe to assure the survival and the success of liberty." (Inaugural address of John F. Kennedy)

=== Hypozeugma ===
Hypozeugma or "adjunctions" (adiunctio) is used in a construction containing several phrases and occurs when the word or words on which all of the phrases depend are placed at the end.

- Assure yourself that Damon to his Pythias, Pylades to his Orestes, Titus to his Gysippus, Theseus to his Pyrothus, Scipio to his Laelius, was never found more faithful than Euphues will be to his Philautus. (John Lyly, Euphues)

=== Prozeugma ===
A prozeugma, synezeugmenon, or praeiunctio is a zeugma whose governing word occurs in the first clause of the sentence.

- Vicit pudorem libido timorem audacia rationem amentia. (Cicero, Pro Cluentio, VI.15)
  "Lust conquered shame; audacity, fear; madness, reason."
- Histories make men wise; poets, witty; the mathematics, subtle; natural philosophy, deep; moral, grave; logic and rhetoric, able to contend. (Francis Bacon)

=== Mesozeugma ===
A mesozeugma is a zeugma whose governing word occurs in the middle of the sentence and governs clauses on either side. A mesozeugma whose common term is a verb is called "conjunction" (coniunctio) in the Roman Rhetorica ad Herennium.

- "What a shame is this, that neither hope of reward, nor feare of reproch could any thing move him, neither the persuasion of his friends, nor the love of his country. [sic]" (Henry Peacham)

== See also ==
- Antanaclasis – Type of pun
- Anaphora – Repeating the same phrase before each clause for emphasis
- Garden-path sentence – Sentence that starts in a way that a reader's likely interpretation will be wrong
- Glossary of rhetorical terms
- Figure of speech – Non-literal word or phrase used for effect
- Homophone – Words pronounced the same but differing in meaning or spelling
- Hypozeuxis – Rhetorical term
- Polysyndeton – Use of conjunctions for rhythmic effect
- Pun – Form of word play
- Rhetoric – Art of persuasion
- Syndeton
- Tom Swifty – Form of word play
- Word play – Form of wit where words are used for special effect
