= Alfred Swan =

Russian composer (1890–1970)

Alfred Julius Swan (21 October [O.S. 9 October] 1890 – 2 October 1970) was a Russian composer and musicologist active in the early to mid-twentieth century. He specialized in Russian liturgical music. His writings include Russian Music and an English translation of Nikolai Medtner's The Muse and the Fashion. His memoirs were published in 1965: Recollections of Young Years. "The Lost Children: A Russian Odyssey", a book recounting he and his first wife's incredible adventures and service during the Russian Revolution and the First World War, was published in 1989 by his second wife, Jane Swan. His nephew was the British composer and musical entertainer Donald Swann.

== Family and early life ==
Alfred, called Alia by his family, was born in St. Petersburg in 1890. He was the eldest son of Alfred Robert Swann, a Russian clerk of English descent, and Sophie Lorentzen, daughter of veterinary surgeon Julius Lorentzen. He had three younger brothers: Edgar Swan, Herbert Swann, and Freddie Swann.

Alfred's grandfather, Alfred Trout Swan, emigrated to Russia from England in 1840, but he and his descendants retained their status as British subjects and their membership in the Anglican Church (until 1936, when he converted to the Russian Orthodoxy) Alfred Trout added a second 'n' to his surname out of respect for his acquaintances among the German expatriate community in St. Petersburg. While Alfred Robert retained this spelling, his sons Alfred J. and Edgar chose to drop it and return to the earlier, English spelling. The family had done business for over five generations with one of the India Rubber Company's toy manufacturing facilities. He grew up tri-lingual in Russian, English and German and early on, displayed an unusual musical talent which he likely got from his Russo-Finnish mother Sophie Lorentzen, an excellent pianist.

Alfred was educated at the German St. Catherine's School St. Petersburg. Nearly all of his immediate family members were enthusiastic appreciators of music, as well as amateur musicians. Alfred trained in first on piano and then on violin and attended concerts frequently. He started quartet playing in his mid-teens and for his talents, was gifted a now-rare Niccolo Giagnano violin by his parents. He greatly admired the compositions of Scriabin and Nikolai Medtner.

== University ==
After graduating from high school in 1907, he was sent to Balliol College, Oxford to study History, but soon transferred to Exeter College and began to study law, where he stayed from 1908 to 1911. In that time, he became friends with Lawrance Collingwood, Harry Ore and a large number of musicians and composers, with whom he would stay in touch throughout his life. After graduating, he returned to Russia and was hired by the Public Notary of the Exchange for the foreign division of St. Petersburg. It was at this point that he began his serious study of music at the Conservatory with Professors Kalafati, Winkler, Karatygin and others. His major interest was focussed on Russian folk-songs and very early Orthodox church chants. In 1914, he composed a cycle of songs that were performed publicly in a concert to good reviews.

== Life in Russia ==
At the start of World War I and the ensuing Russian revolution and various civil wars raging within Russia, Swan and his fiancee, and subsequent wife, Catherine became involved with the American Red Cross' attempts to organize and shelter the so-called "Children's Colonies"—nearly one thousand orphaned, dislocated or abandoned children who had been shipped out of St. Petersburg to avoid the famine associated with the Revolution, invading forces and general chaos. In 1918, under the auspices of The Red Cross and the assistance of the YMCA, he and Catherine located and organized groups of children spread throughout the Ukraine and along the Volga River. Rounding them up and establishing colonies at sympathetic 'White Russian' dashas and compounds, they organized classes, duties and appointed a number of senior children as leaders of each new colony, while traveling to identify other clusters of displaced children.

Over the next two years, plans were laid and executed to bring the colonies together and transport the children and their teachers eastward across Russia, Siberia and finally to the port city of Vladivostok. There the Red Cross had chartered a Japanese freighter, the 'Yomei Maru' to take them across the Pacific to San Francisco, CA., then through the Panama Canal to New York. After two weeks in New York, the children, their teachers, and the American Red Cross personnel crossed the Atlantic to Brest, France, and then the Baltic Sea to Finland. From November 1920 to January 1921, groups of children were escorted by American Red Cross personnel to the bridge crossing the Sestra River, then marking the Finnish-Soviet border, and returned by train to Petrograd to be reunited with their parents and surviving relatives. All in all, Swan and his colleagues were able to rescue and repatriate almost 800 displaced children. Some of the children stayed in close touch with Swan throughout their lives and welcomed him back to Russia when he visited in the mid-1960s. After Swan's death in 1970, his second wife, Jane Ballard Swan published a painstakingly researched history of the remarkable journey, titled The Lost Children: A Russian Odyssey (1989).

== Professional life in the United States ==
Swan was married twice. He lived with his first wife in London during the 1920s before moving to the United States in 1926 to take a position teaching music at the University of Virginia. From there, he was recruited to join the musical studies department at Swarthmore College. Several years later while now a Professor, and eventually Chairman of Music at Swarthmore, he founded the Department of Music at Haverford College.

It was in one of his introduction to music classes that he was to meet a student, Jane Powell Ballard (1925-2010), who later became his second wife in 1947. In 1949, his only son, Alexis, was born. In the late 1950s Swan was hired by Haverford College to found their musical department and for over a decade he taught jointly at both colleges, and finally, full-time at Haverford where he taught classes well into his seventies.

His theory and composition classes at both Swarthmore and Haverford attracted thousands of undergraduate students for whom this was their first taste of music outside of AM radio, records and concerts, and certainly their first exposure to classical music. Many of them remained in touch with Swan over the decades and among them were two Haverford undergraduates named John Davison and Truman Bullard. Davison followed Swan to eventually teach at Haverford and became the Chairman of the Music Department until his passing in the 1980s. Bullard became Chairman of the Music Department at Dickinson College in Carlisle, PA.

During the late 1950s and 1960s, he and his wife would travel most summers back to Europe where he would meet life-long colleagues and collaborators. His son Alexis had been sent to boarding school in England in 1962 and they would meet him during his summer holidays and stay 5–6 weeks each year in the South of France where Swan taught a course in composition at Aix-Marseille University in Nice. He would lecture to a class of French college students while Jane illustrated his points with chosen musical selections played back on the portable Wollensak tape recorder Jane brought along.

He died just before his 80th birthday, while composing at the piano, in Haverford, Pennsylvania, USA.
