= At the Drop of a Hat =

Musical revue by Flanders and Swann

- Opening night programme
- Music: Donald Swann
- Lyrics: Michael Flanders, Gérard de Nerval, Sydney Carter, Constantine Palamas traditional
- Productions: 1956 London fringe 1957 London West End; 1959 New York, Broadway

At the Drop of a Hat is a musical revue by Flanders and Swann, described by them as "an after-dinner farrago". In the show, they both sang on a nearly bare stage, accompanied by Swann on the piano. The songs were linked by contemporary social commentary, mostly by Flanders. After a long London run the show played in the US, Switzerland, and on tour in Britain.

== Background ==
Michael Flanders and Donald Swann had performed together as schoolboys, collaborating in 1940 on a revue at Westminster School. They later collaborated on writing songs for revues, performed by such artists as Max Adrian, Elsie and Doris Waters, Ian Carmichael and Joyce Grenfell. They also wrote songs for Ian Wallace, some of which he recorded on the LP Wallace's Private Zoo. As successful songwriters they were invited to lecture on the subject at Dartington International Summer School in 1956. Flanders found that his spoken introductions were as well received by the audience as the songs themselves. He and Swann decided to give a show along similar lines in London. They approached Frederick Piffard, manager of the New Lindsey Theatre, a fringe venue seating about 150 people, outside the London West End theatre district, and played him some of their numbers. Swann recalled:

"Nice songs", said Freddie Piffard, "but who's in it?"
"Us," we said timidly.
"Well, you pay the rent," he said, "it's up to you."

Flanders and Swann in the show

The show opened on 31 December 1956 at the New Lindsey. No West End shows were opening on that evening, and consequently, as Swann put it, "quite a number of critics turned up on spec." In The Observer, Kenneth Tynan called the show "a witty and educated diversion … Mr. Swann, bent over his piano like a small mad scientist agog over some wild experiment, ideally complements the bearded suavity of Mr. Flanders, who exudes from his wheelchair the robust authority of him who came to dinner." Other notices were equally good, the box-office did excellent business, and the show transferred to the Fortune Theatre in the West End on 24 January 1957, where, according to The Times, "it took the audience by storm". It ran for 808 performances at the Fortune until 2 May 1959. On 8 October 1959 the show opened in New York at the John Golden Theatre, running there for 215 performances. In the New York Herald Tribune Walter Kerr wrote, "Whatever it is that runs through both these gentlemen's veins it makes them lively, witty, literate, ingratiating, explosively funny and excellent company for a daffy and delightful evening".

== Description ==
The two-man show was performed with Flanders in a wheelchair (as a result of polio contracted in 1943) and Swann at a grand piano on an otherwise empty stage. The only other person to appear on stage was the stage manager, who brought on and handed to Flanders the "little Edwardian hat" he wore for "Madeira, M'Dear?". The show consisted of a collection of mainly humorous songs, mostly written by them, connected by topical comments. A second revue called At the Drop of Another Hat was produced in 1963.

Each performance ended with the "Hippopotamus" song, in which the audience was encouraged to join in, followed, in Britain, by a musical rendition of the Lord Chamberlain's regulations.

== Numbers ==
Most of the numbers were performed as duets. Solos are noted in the table below. The numbers for the original performances were:

| Number | Notes |
|---|---|
| "A Transport of Delight" | The delights of travelling by a London Transport bus. |
| "Song of Reproduction" | The closing verse references singers who were not necessarily in the contemporary public consciousness, Enrico Caruso having died in 1921 - "With a tone control at a single touch/ I can make a Caruso sound like Hutch", (Variously, "Bel canto sounds like Double Dutch". |
| "The Hog Beneath the Skin" (The Warthog) | Sung by Flanders |
| "The Youth of the Heart" | Words by Sydney Carter, sung by Swann |
| "Greensleeves" | Monologue by Flanders purportedly explaining the history of the tune "Greensleeves" |
| "Sea Fever" | Dropped from the first show; restored in At the Drop of Another Hat |
| "In the Bath" | Dropped from the first show; restored in At the Drop of Another Hat |
| "A Gnu" | Sung by Flanders |
| "Bed" | Song about the delights of sleep and laziness; soon dropped from the show, supposedly as it was making the audience nod off. |
| "Vanessa" | Flanders bemoans the 'terrible thing' Vanessa did to him, but doesn't explain what, and his friends don't care. |
| "Je suis le ténébreux" | Setting of a sonnet, "El desdichado", by Gérard de Nerval, sung by Swann in the original French |
| "Songs for Our Time": | |
| – "Philological Waltz" | |
| – "Satellite Moon" | Sung by Flanders. |
| – "Topical Song (Harold Macmillan)" | |
| – "A Happy Song" | |
| "A Song of the Weather" | A litany of the months of the year, with their (cold and wet) weather, sung by Flanders in a faux West Country accent. A parody of the 1834 poem "January Brings the Snow" by Sara Coleridge |
| "The Reluctant Cannibal" | A cannibal's son decides he won't eat people anymore. |
| "Mopy Dick" | |
| "Design for Living" | Two friends set up home, which is 'terribly House and Garden' and 'ever so very comptempary'. |
| "Tried by the Centre Court" | Monologue by Flanders as a disgruntled tennis umpire |
| "Misalliance" | |
| "Miranda" | Setting by Swann of a poem by Constantine Palamas, addressed to the heroine of The Tempest |
| "Kokoraki ... A Greek Song" | Greek equivalent of Old MacDonald Had a Farm sung by Swann |
| "Madeira, M'Dear?" | Sung by Flanders |
| "The Hippopotamus" (Mud, Mud, Glorious Mud) | |
| Encores – Words from the Lord Chamberlain's regulations: "Smoking is Permitted" "The Safety Curtain" "The Public May Leave" | |

Source: The Donald Swann Website

== Additional songs ==
During the run of At the Drop of a Hat, the writers added new songs and dropped others. These included:

| Number | Notes |
|---|---|
| "The Wompom" | 1959 EP (with "Grandma") |
| "Grandma" | 1959 EP (with "The Wompom"). Originally part of an extensive "Seven Ages of Women" from the 1953 revue Airs on a Shoestring. The full number was recorded complete in 1974 by Flanders, Swann, Julian Orchard, Pat Lancaster, Charlotte Mitchell and Anne Rogers. EMI LP EMCM 3088. |
| "The Elephant" | Live recording, Fortune Theatre, 24 March 1958; studio recording on The Bestiary of Flanders and Swann, Parlophone PCS 3026, 1961 |
| "Down Below" | Words by Sydney Carter. Live recording by Flanders and Swann, Blackstone Theatre, Chicago, 2 February 1961. Swann accompanies Ian Wallace in a studio recording reissued on EMI CD 0724357592659. |
| "The Hundred Song" | One of the "Songs for our Time", originally one of the "Bottom Five" for the revue "Fresh Airs" (1955). Live undated recording released in 1977 on Parlophone NTS 116. |
| "Too Many Cookers | Recorded live April or May 1959 and issued in October 1959 |
| "The Great New Motorway" | Topical song, originally for the London show but adopted for any city with unfinished building projects e. g. "The Great New Gardiner Expressway" when in Toronto, 1961, or "The Great New Sydney Opera House" when in Adelaide, 1964 |
| "Good Literature" | Words by Sydney Carter |
| "Say Who You Are" | Words by Sydney Carter |
| "Sing a Song of Fivepence" | About decimalisation, sung in Australia |
| "Russia is Red, Dilly Dilly" | Words by Sydney Carter, about the space race |
| "Commonwealth Fair" | Live undated recording released in 1977 on Parlophone NTS 116. |

== Recordings ==
Two LP discs of At the Drop of a Hat were issued by Parlophone. The first (PMC 1033), in mono, consisted of recordings made at the show's 50th performance at the Fortune Theatre on 21 February 1957 and another show on 25 February. The numbers on the LP are

Side one

- A Transport of Delight
- Song of Reproduction
- A Gnu
- Design for Living
- Je suis le ténébreux
- Songs for Our Time:
  Philological Waltz
  Satellite Moon
  A Happy Song

Side two

- A Song of the Weather
- The Reluctant Cannibal
- Greensleeves
- Misalliance
- Miranda
- Kokoraki – A Greek Song
- Madeira, M'Dear?
- Hippopotamus
- Encore – Words from the Lord Chamberlain's regulations: The Public May Leave.

The second LP recording, in stereo, (Parlophone PCS 3001) was made at the Fortune on the last night of the West End run, on 2 May 1959. The numbers on the LP were the same as those on the earlier recording, with the exceptions of "Kokoraki" and "The Public May Leave", which were omitted.

== Other songs from the original show, recorded by Flanders and Swann ==
| Number | Notes |
|---|---|
| "The Warthog" | Live recording, New Lindsey Theatre, 13 January 1957; studio recording on The Bestiary of Flanders and Swann, Parlophone PCS 3026, 1961 |
| "The Whale (Mopy Dick)" | Live recording, New Lindsey Theatre, 13 January 1957; studio recording on The Bestiary |
| "The Youth of the Heart" | Studio Recording 12 July 1957; issued on Parlophone GEP 8636, October 1957 |
| "Sea Fever" | Recorded 18 October 1963; issued on Parlophone EP GEP 8912, 1964 |
| "Miranda" | Live recording, Fortune Theatre, 11 April 1959 |
| "In the Bath" | Recorded live April or May 1959 and issued in October 1959; recorded 18 October 1963; issued on Parlophone EP GEP 8912, 1964 |
| "Bed" | Live undated recording released in 1977 on Parlophone NTS 116 |
| "Vanessa" | Studio recording, 12 July 1957; issued on Parlophone GEP 8636 in October 1957. Recorded live April or May 1959 and issued in October 1959 |
| "Tried by the Centre Court" | Studio recording, 12 July 1957; issued on Parlophone GEP 8636 in October 1957. Recorded live April or May 1959 and issued in October 1959 |
| Encores – Words from the Lord Chamberlain's regulations: – "Smoking is Permitted" – "The Safety Curtain" | Recorded in 1974 by Flanders, Swann, Julian Orchard, Pat Lancaster, Charlotte Mitchell and Anne Rogers. EMI LP EMCM 3088 |

=== CDs ===
After the deaths of Flanders and Swann many private recordings came to light in their personal collections and elsewhere. Two substantial CD sets have been assembled drawing on these, and the original EMI recordings, together with a 1974 BBC radio programme in which the writers revived some of their neglected numbers. The sets are:

- The Complete Flanders and Swann (EMI, 1991)

The numbers from the original programme of At the Drop of a Hat in this three CD set comprise all those on the original Parlophone LP, plus "Bed", "Too Many Cookers", "Vanessa", "Tried by the Centre Court", "The Youth of the Heart", "The Warthog" and "Mopy Dick".

- Hat-Trick: Flanders & Swann Collector's Edition (EMI, 2007)

A four disc set. The numbers from the original programme of At the Drop of a Hat are as in the 1991 CD set, with the addition of "Miranda".

== See also ==
- "At the Drop of a Hat", a short story by Denise Hamilton in the anthology Thriller (2006)
