= Textual scholarship =

Academic analysis of texts

Textual scholarship (or textual studies) is an umbrella term for disciplines that deal with describing, transcribing, editing, or annotating texts and physical documents. It examines how texts are produced, transmitted, and transformed over time, considering both their material and linguistic forms. From the recovery and collation of manuscript witnesses to the creation of critical or digital editions that reflect textual variation and editorial decision-making, textual scholarship encompasses a wide range of practices. The field integrates traditional philological methods with contemporary digital approaches, bridging historical textual criticism and modern data-driven humanities research.

== Overview ==
Textual research is primarily a historically oriented field. Textual scholars study, for instance, how writing practices and printing technology have developed, how a certain writer has written and revised his or her texts, how literary documents have been edited, the history of reading culture, as well as censorship and the authenticity of texts. The subjects, methods and theoretical backgrounds of textual research vary widely, but what they have in common is an interest in the genesis and derivation of texts and textual variation in these practices.

Many textual scholars are interested in author intention while others seek to see how text is transmitted. Textual scholars often produce critical editions of the texts they study.

Disciplines of textual scholarship include, among others, textual criticism, stemmatology, paleography, genetic criticism, bibliography, and history of the book. Textual scholar David Greetham has described textual scholarship as a term encompassing "the procedures of enumerative bibliographers, descriptive, analytical, and historical bibliographers, paleographers and codicologists, textual editors, and annotators-cumulatively and collectively". Some disciplines of textual scholarship focus on certain material sources or text genres, such as epigraphy, codicology and diplomatics.

The historical roots of textual scholarship can be traced back to the 3rd century BCE, when the scholarly activities of copying, comparing, describing and archiving texts became professionalized in the Library of Alexandria.

== See also ==
- Documentary editing
- Text publication society
