= David Greetham (textual scholar) =

Anglo-American literary critic (1941–2020)

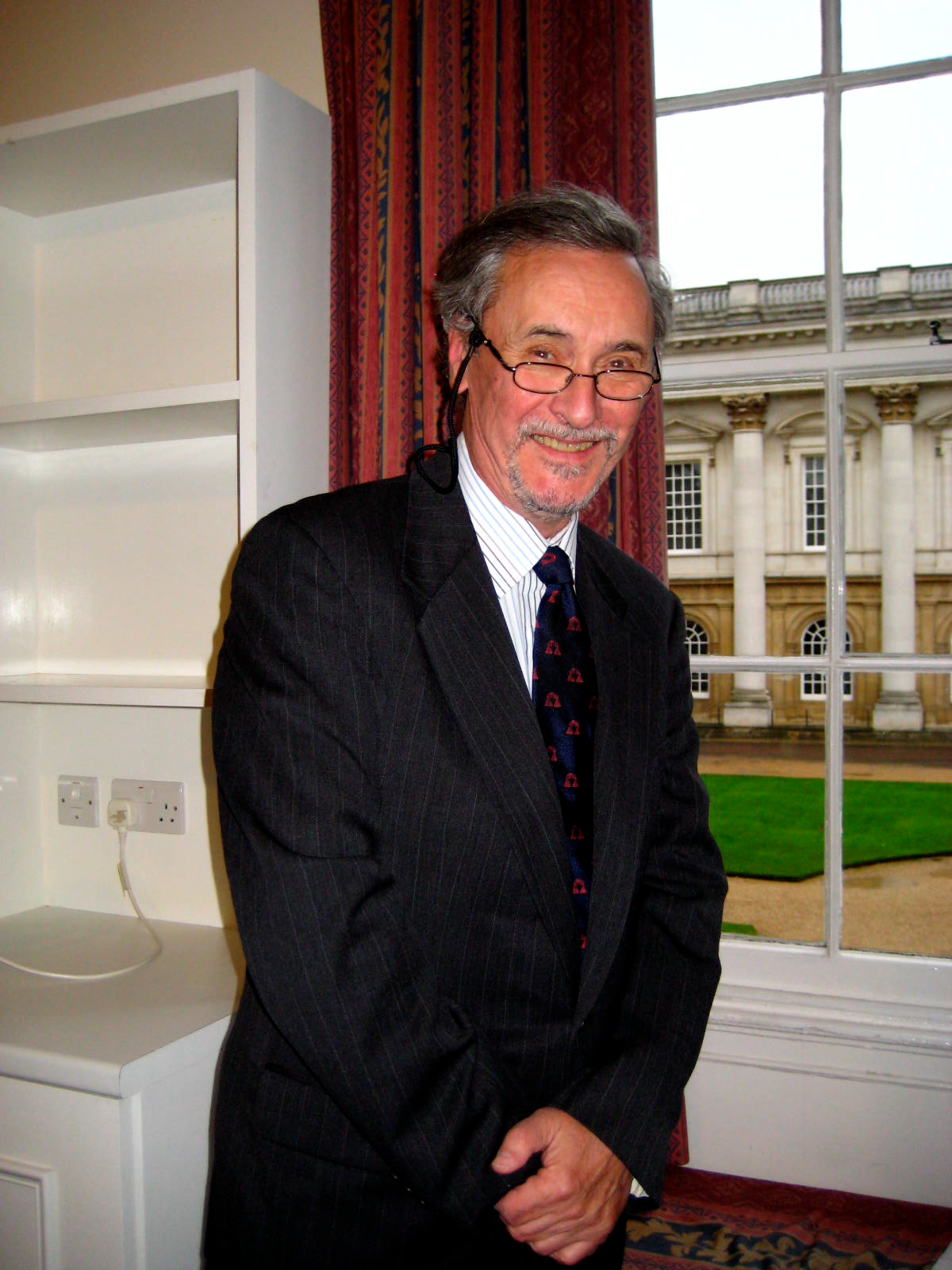
- David Greetham
- Born: October 21, 1941; Cheshire, England
- Died: March 24, 2020 (aged 78)

Academic work
- School or tradition: Textual scholarship
- Institutions: The Graduate Center, CUNY

David Greetham (October 21, 1941 – March 24, 2020) was an American literary critic and the founder of the Society for Textual Scholarship.

== Career ==
Greetham received his undergraduate degree from the University of Oxford in 1963 and completed his Ph.D. in English at the City University of New York.

Marta Werner of D'Youville College describes Greetham as "drawn to texts that spill over the boundaries of genre, that exist in multiple versions, that explore intertextuality, and that complicate in various other ways the notion of text as fixed or stable." In his works, Greetham has sought to co-opt "the terminology and practice of literary theory in re-designating textual operations in the guise of ... literature, anthropology, sociology, gender studies, history, political science, linguistics, psychology, [and] philosophy."

As a theorist of scholarly editing, Greetham has taken up a middle ground between intentionalist positions like that of G. Thomas Tanselle and the social textual criticism of Jerome McGann, maintaining the goal of establishing an authoritative text while allowing the possibility that multiple authorized versions can exist. In his later work, Greetham has moved away from the idea that an editor can establish a "psychic" connection with the author through which he or she can determine the author's true intentions, instead seeing editing as an occasion for reflections on the ideology underlying scholarly practice.

Greetham died on March 24, 2020, from a long-illness at the age of 78.

== Society for Textual Scholarship ==
Greetham was one of the founders of the Society for Textual Scholarship and served as the Society's President from 1999 to 2001. Founded in 1979, the Society provides an interdisciplinary forum for presentation of research in a number of textual disciplines. Notable past members have included G. Thomas Tanselle, Paul Oskar Kristeller, Fredson Bowers, and Jerome McGann.

== Selected works ==
- The Pleasures of Contamination (2010)
- Theories of the Text (1999)
- Textual Transgressions: Essays Toward the Construction of a Biobibliography (1998)
- The Margins of the Text: Editorial Theory and Literary Criticism (1997)
- Scholarly Editing: A Guide to Research (1995)
- Textual Scholarship: An Introduction (1992)
- TEXT: An Interdisciplinary Annual of Textual Studies (1984)
