= Michael Flanders =

English actor and writer (1922–1975)

Michael Flanders OBE
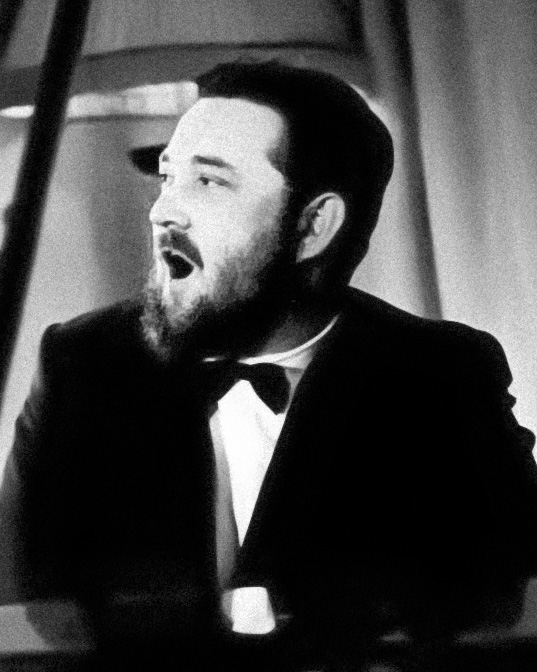
- Flanders in 1966
- Born: Michael Henry Flanders; 1 March 1922; London, England
- Died: 14 April 1975 (aged 53); Betws-y-Coed, Wales
- Occupations: Actor, broadcaster, writer and performer
- Spouse: Claudia Cockburn
- Children: Laura Flanders; Stephanie Flanders

GO TO IT!
Westminster School Revue
St David's Institute, Exeter, 26 July 1940
Produced, devised and presented by
M. H. Flanders
Musical arrangements by
Donald Swann
Further performances—
Moreland Hall, Hampstead, 28 August 1940
Rudolph Steiner Hall, London, 29 August 1940

— The first Flanders and Swann show

Michael Henry Flanders OBE (1 March 1922 – 14 April 1975) was an English actor, broadcaster, writer and performer of comic songs. He is best known for his stage partnership with Donald Swann.

As a young man Flanders seemed to be heading for a successful acting career. However, he contracted polio in 1943 while serving in the Royal Navy Volunteer Reserve and for the rest of his life was reliant on a wheelchair. He made a career as a prolific broadcaster on the radio and later on television. Moreover, he together with his old school friend, the composer Donald Swann, wrote successful songs in the late 1940s to the early and mid-1950s for revues in the West End of London. In 1956, they themselves performed some of these songs, along with new songs, in a two-man revue, At the Drop of a Hat. This show, and its successor, At the Drop of Another Hat, ran with occasional short breaks from 1956 to 1967 and played in theatres throughout the British Isles, the US, Australia and elsewhere.

During and after the stage partnership with Swann, Flanders pursued a many-faceted career, performing on stage, screen, radio, concert platforms and recordings. He wrote opera librettos, a children's book, a volume of poetry and the words of Captain Noah and His Floating Zoo, a cantata about Noah's Ark.

== Life and career ==
=== Early years ===
Flanders was born in Hampstead, London, the third child and only son to Percy Henry Flanders and his wife, Rosa Laura ("Laurie"), daughter of Charles O'Beirne, of Hastings. His father had a variety of occupations, including actor and cinema manager. His mother was a professional violinist.

From 1936 to 1940, Flanders was a pupil at Westminster School, where his contemporaries included Peter Ustinov, Peter Brook, Tony Benn and Donald Swann. In his last term in 1940, he and Swann collaborated on a school revue called Go To It! From Westminster, Flanders went up to Christ Church, Oxford, to read History. There he acted and directed for the Oxford University Dramatic Society and the Experimental Theatre Club. His roles included Brabantio in Othello, Pirandello's Henry IV and Shawcross in Auden and Isherwood's The Ascent of F6. He also wrote drama criticisms for the Oxford magazine Cherwell. In October 1941 he made his professional acting debut at the Oxford Playhouse as Valentine in Shaw's You Never Can Tell. His biographer and Oxford contemporary Michael Meyer writes of Flanders in this period:

a lean and long-striding six-foot three, a fine oarsman and quarter-miler and by far the outstanding Oxford actor of our year. None of us had any doubt that he would be the Olivier or Donat of our generation; with his height, athleticism, thin, handsome face, deep intelligence and splendid voice, he was formidably, perhaps completely, equipped.

In 1942, Flanders applied to join the Royal Navy Volunteer Reserve, serving at first as an able seaman, and later commissioned as a sub-lieutenant. He survived unharmed a torpedo attack in 1942 on his ship, HMS Marne, but the following year he contracted poliomyelitis at sea and spent the next three years in hospitals. In 1946, he was discharged, but remained a wheelchair user for the rest of his life. He was deeply upset when the university authorities refused, because of his disabilities, to allow him back to resume his studies.

=== Postwar ===
Flanders returned to the family home in Hampstead Garden Suburb. He directed and produced plays with a local amateur theatre group and arranged small musical gatherings with other amateurs of music, including Gerard Hoffnung and Frank Hauser. A stage acting career being no longer possible, he found work as a radio broadcaster and wrote a few song lyrics. At the same time, Swann began composing music for revues. He recalled in 1974,

We wrote our first song in the summer of 1948. I'd gone over to Michael's home near Hampstead Heath to see if he could think of some words for a tune I'd written ... "It all sounds a bit like Gilbert and Sullivan, don't you think? ... It must be terribly boring in the D'Oyly Carte Company, having to do everything exactly as it always has been done – Idea!"

The resulting trio, "In the D'Oyly Cart" [sic], for three disgruntled Savoyards, was accepted by the producer Laurier Lister for his new show Oranges and Lemons. The revue and the trio were highly successful, and Lister commissioned further work from the pair for his next production, Penny Plain (1951). Among their contributions to the latter were "Prehistoric Complaint", a solo for Max Adrian, "dressed in bits of fur as a sort of mis-fit caveman", and "Surly Girls", with Adrian, Desmond Walter-Ellis and Jimmy Thompson as a trio of appalling St Trinian's schoolgirls.

Of the first Beggar's Opera they used to say
That it made Gay rich and it made Rich gay:
Revived by our hero after all these years,
It made Bundles for Britten, and Piles for Pears.

— "Guide to Britten", 1953

The Flanders and Swann numbers in the two shows worked so well that Lister invited the pair to write much of his next revue, Airs on a Shoestring (1953). Their topics ranged from economics and politics ("There's a Hole in My Budget") to a plaintive song about London's last tram ("Last of the Line") to a send-up of Benjamin Britten's works to date ("Guide to Britten"). In the same year Flanders wrote the libretto for a short opera by Antony Hopkins, Three's Company. They followed this up the next year with A Christmas Story. Also in 1954 Flanders, in partnership with Kitty Black (1914–2006), translated Stravinsky's Histoire du soldat for the Edinburgh Festival. The work played to capacity audiences in Edinburgh, and again in London at the Royal Festival Hall in 1956 with Flanders as the narrator, Sir Ralph Richardson as the Soldier and Peter Ustinov as the Devil. The translation has held its place as the standard English version into the 21st century.

During the 1950s, Flanders consolidated his career as a broadcaster, on radio, and later on television, in programmes ranging from sports commentary to poetry readings, and including a two-year stint as chairman of The Brains Trust after it moved from radio to television. He preferred performing to writing, and said that he wrote mainly "to give myself something to perform."

=== At the Drop of a Hat ===
As established and successful songwriters Flanders and Swann were invited to lecture on their craft at Dartington International Summer School in 1956. Flanders found that his spoken introductions were as well received by the audience as were the songs themselves. He and Swann decided to give a show along similar lines in London. They took the New Lindsey Theatre for a limited three-week run; the New Lindsey, holding about 150 people, was situated outside the London West End theatre district. The show opened on 31 December 1956. The press notices were good, the box-office did excellent business, and the pair were offered a West End transfer. Swann recalled in 1977, "We turned it down unanimously. It seemed to spell the end of Michael's radio career (he had by that time done at least a thousand broadcasts) and the end of Swann as composer". After each had spent two or three sleepless nights worrying, they reconsidered; the show transferred to the Fortune Theatre in Covent Garden on 24 January 1957, where, according to The Times, "it took the audience by storm". The critic J. C. Trewin wrote, "I feel that even [W. S.] Gilbert might have applauded the intricate neatness of their numbers. ... I urge you to hear Mr Flanders as he explains the precise derivation of 'Greensleeves'." The show ran for 808 performances at the Fortune, until 2 May 1959.

In August 1959, Flanders and Swann took the revue to the Edinburgh Festival. On 8 October they opened in New York at Broadway's John Golden Theatre, playing there for 215 performances. In the New York Herald Tribune, Walter Kerr wrote, "Whatever it is that runs through both these gentlemen's veins it makes them lively, witty, literate, ingratiating, explosively funny and excellent company for a daffy and delightful evening". After closing on Broadway they toured the show through 12 cities in the US, one in Canada and three in Switzerland. During 1962 and 1963, they revived the production in Canada and toured the British Isles, appearing in 17 towns and cities. During the tour they continually added new songs and dropped old ones; by the time they returned to the West End in October 1963 the programme was so different from that given at their last London appearance more than four years earlier that the show had a new title: At the Drop of Another Hat.

=== At the Drop of Another Hat ===
Michael Flanders's lyrics, at their best, approach the intricate ease of W. S. Gilbert.

— Bamber Gascoigne, The Observer, 1963

The second show followed the pattern of the first, with songs and monologues linked by comment and introductions by Flanders. It opened on 2 October 1963 at the Theatre Royal, Haymarket, a much larger house than the Fortune (with 900 seats to the Fortune's 438). Once again the reviews were excellent. The Daily Express called the show "an instant success"; The Times called it "a delicious entertainment … an inimitable evening":

They continue to write animal songs (one celebrating a love affair between an armadillo and a derelict tank is the best of the new group) and songs about little Britain (vanishing railway stations, the habits of the British workman &c.) … and there are occasional raids on other composers – notably a prestissimo Mozart movement to a song about the trials of an amateur horn player. Mr Flanders reaches his peak in two monologues – an account of an olive-stuffing fiesta in the Andorran foothills, and a derisive commentary by a contemporary onlooker at the building of Stonehenge.

The duo played at the Haymarket until 21 March 1964, and after a break they toured the show in Australia, New Zealand, Hong Kong and southern England, before opening again in London, at the Globe Theatre in September 1965, playing there until February 1966. Finally, they toured the show in Canada and the US, concluding in a Broadway run at the Booth Theatre from 31 December 1966 to 9 April 1967.

Flanders was the subject of a BBC Light Programme broadcast in the series I'll Never Forget the Day in which celebrities recalled days that changed their lives. Flanders would never forget the day he had a headache which turned out to be the first symptom of poliomyelitis.

The decision to stop playing the Hat shows was chiefly Swann's, who felt they were impeding his range as a serious composer. The two remained friends and continued to collaborate from time to time.

Michael Flanders was the subject of This Is Your Life in 1972 when he was surprised by Eamonn Andrews.

=== Other work ===
During breaks in the schedule of the Hat shows, and after they had come to an end, Flanders performed on radio, television, stage, film and the concert platform. In 1962, he appeared at the Aldwych Theatre, London, as the Storyteller in the Royal Shakespeare Company's production of Brecht's The Caucasian Chalk Circle. In 1970, he starred in the revue Ten Years Hard by Peter Myers; his performance was praised, but the show was not, and it closed within a month. He acted in the films Doctor in Distress (1963) and The Raging Moon (1971).

Flanders continued to broadcast on radio and television. On BBC radio he was the anchorman of the "Scrapbook" and "Battle for the Atlantic" series, and he was a regular on the quiz shows "Twenty Questions" and "Animal, Vegetable and Mineral". On television he presented the concert, opera and ballet series "Gala Performance". He provided the storyteller's voice on the British soundtrack of the Barbapapa animated cartoon series, and narrated many documentaries, including the 1969 BBC Royal Family.

As a writer, Flanders's best-known work other than his revue lyrics is probably the text for the children's cantata Captain Noah and His Floating Zoo with music by Joseph Horovitz, which won an Ivor Novello Award in 1976. He published a book of poems, Creatures Great and Small, in 1964, and a children's book The Sayings and Doings of Nasrudin the Wise in 1974.

==== Recordings ====
Parlophone records made live recordings of both the Hat shows, and studio recordings of a collection of the songs about animals. Unreleased material, privately recorded or off-air, was later released on LP and CD.

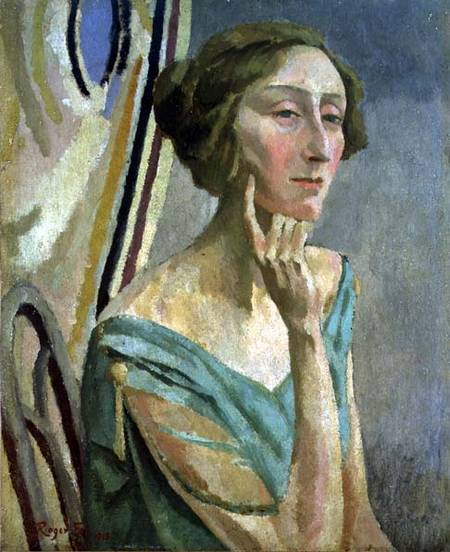
Edith Sitwell (portrait by Roger Fry): Flanders was fascinated by her Façade poems.

For EMI Flanders recorded the narration of Peter and the Wolf with the Philharmonia Orchestra conducted by Efrem Kurtz (1959). With Fenella Fielding he recorded Edith Sitwell's Façade poems with Walton's music played by the Academy of St Martin in the Fields conducted by Neville Marriner (1972). Flanders had long been fascinated by Façade: "It is an extraordinarily difficult work – even an impossible one. There are times when you are just forced to babble, others when you are completely swamped by the orchestra. It really pushes you to the limits".

Flanders recorded as narrator in his and Antony Hopkins's opera Three's Company (1954); as reader in "Touches of Sweet Harmony – Music inspired by Shakespeare" (1962); as the Dromios in The Comedy of Errors with John Neville as the Antipholuses (1963); and as reader of the whole of St Mark's Gospel on a three LP set (1962). With the Michael Sammes singers he recorded "The Little Drummer Boy", which was issued as a single disc and as part of a compilation EP, with introductions by Flanders, "The Christmas Story". He was the narrator on an EMI LP "Elizabeth the Great" (1963) celebrating Queen Elizabeth I, with Mary Morris as Elizabeth.

=== Personal life ===
On 31 December 1959, Flanders married Claudia Davis, daughter of the journalist Claud Cockburn and stepdaughter of Robert Gorham Davis, professor of English at Columbia University in New York. They had two daughters, both of whom became journalists: Laura and Stephanie.

Flanders was appointed an Officer of the Order of the British Empire (OBE) in the 1964 New Year's Honours. He was an eloquent advocate of better access to theatres for people with disabilities, and later he interested himself in other campaigning issues. After his death, Claudia Flanders continued to promote the cause of accessibility for wheelchair users.

Flanders died suddenly on 14 April 1975, aged 53, of a ruptured intracranial berry aneurysm, while on holiday at Betws-y-Coed, Wales. His ashes were scattered in the grounds of Chiswick House in west London, a place where he had often liked to sit in the afternoon during the final years of his life.

=== Commemoration ===
On 30 June 2007, BBC Radio 4's The Archive Hour broadcast "Flanders on Flanders", a documentary by Flanders's daughter Stephanie about her father and his work. The Michael Flanders Centre, a 75-place day care centre in Acton, London, was founded in his honour by Claudia Flanders and others.
