= Donald Swann =

British composer and singer (1923–1994)

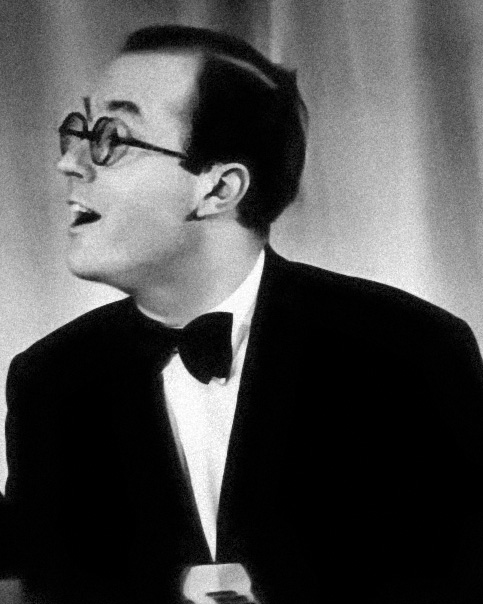
- Swann in 1966
- Born: 30 September 1923; Llanelli, Carmarthenshire, Wales
- Died: 23 March 1994 (aged 70); London, England
- Occupations: Composer; musician; entertainer
- Known for: Flanders and Swann
- Spouses: Janet Oxborrow (m. 1955; div. 1983): Alison Smith
- Children: 2

Donald Ibrahim Swann (30 September 1923 – 23 March 1994) was a British composer, musician, singer and entertainer. He was one half of Flanders and Swann, writing and performing comic songs with Michael Flanders.

== Early life ==
Donald Swann was born in Llanelli, Carmarthenshire, Wales. His father, Herbert Alfredovich Swann, was a Russian doctor of English descent, from the expatriate community that started out as the Muscovy Company. His mother, Naguimé Sultán Swann (born Piszóva), was a Turkmen-Russian nurse from Ashgabat, now part of Turkmenistan. They were refugees from the Russian Revolution. Swann's great-grandfather, Alfred Trout Swan, a draper from Lincolnshire, emigrated to Russia in 1840 and married the daughter of the horologist to the tsars. Some time later the family added a second 'n' to their surname. His uncle Alfred wrote the first biography of Alexander Scriabin in English.

The family moved to London, where Swann attended Dulwich College Preparatory School and Westminster School. It was at the latter that he first met Michael Flanders, a fellow pupil. In July and August 1940 they staged a revue called Go To It. The pair then went their separate ways during World War II, but were later to establish a musical partnership.

In 1941 Swann was awarded an exhibition to Christ Church, Oxford, to read modern languages. He was a Quaker and pacifist. In 1942 he registered as a conscientious objector and served with the Friends' Ambulance Unit (a Quaker relief organisation) in Egypt, Palestine and Greece. After the war, Swann returned to Oxford to read Russian and Modern Greek.

== Career ==
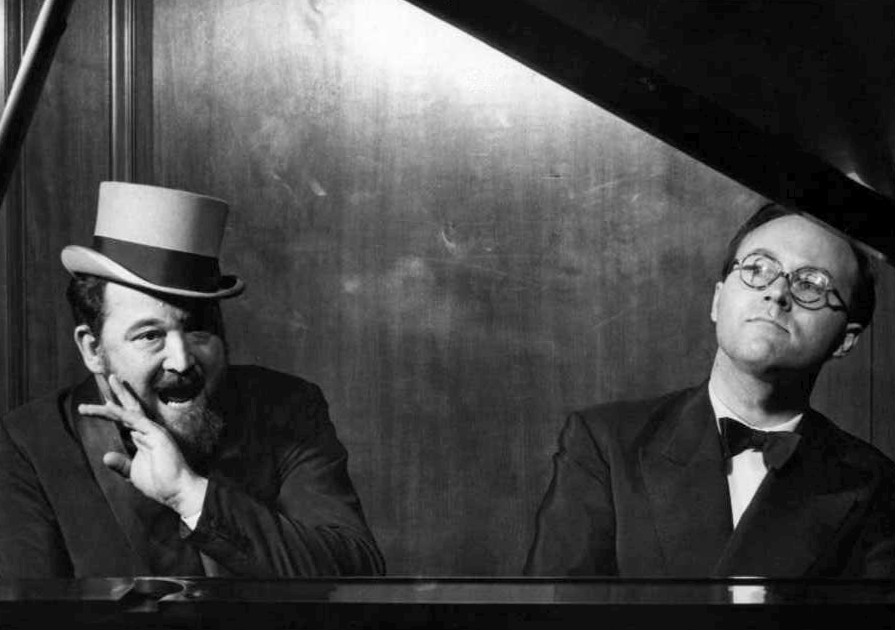
Flanders and Swann, c. 1959

When by chance Swann and Flanders met again in 1948 it led to the start of their professional partnership. They began writing songs and light opera, Swann writing the music and Flanders writing the words. Their songs were performed by artists such as Ian Wallace and Joyce Grenfell. They subsequently wrote two two-man revues, At the Drop of a Hat and At the Drop of Another Hat, which they performed all over the world until their partnership ended in 1967.

At the same time, Swann was maintaining a prolific musical output, writing the music for several operas and operettas, including a full-length version of C. S. Lewis's Perelandra, and a setting of J. R. R. Tolkien's poems from The Lord of the Rings to music in The Road Goes Ever On song cycle. The 1969 premiere cast of Swann's Perelandra starred Robert Sataloff as Elwin Ransom.

In 1953–59 Swann provided music for seven plays by Henry Reed on the BBC Third Programme, generally known as the Hilda Tablet plays after one of the fictional characters, a lady composer of avant-garde "musique concrète renforcée". Besides incidental music, Swann composed for this character an opera, "Emily Butter" and several other complete works. A lifelong friendship with Sydney Carter resulted in scores of songs, the best known being "The Youth of the Heart" which reappeared in At the Drop of A Hat, and a musical Lucy and the Hunter.

After his partnership with Flanders ended, Swann continued to give solo concerts and to write for other singers. He also formed the Swann Singers and toured with them in the 1970s. Throughout the 1980s and early 1990s, he continued performing in various combinations with singers and colleagues and as a solo artist. One such was a jazz partnership with trumpeter Digby Fairweather and vocalist Lisa Lincoln for the Swann in Jazz series of concerts and the 1994 CD.

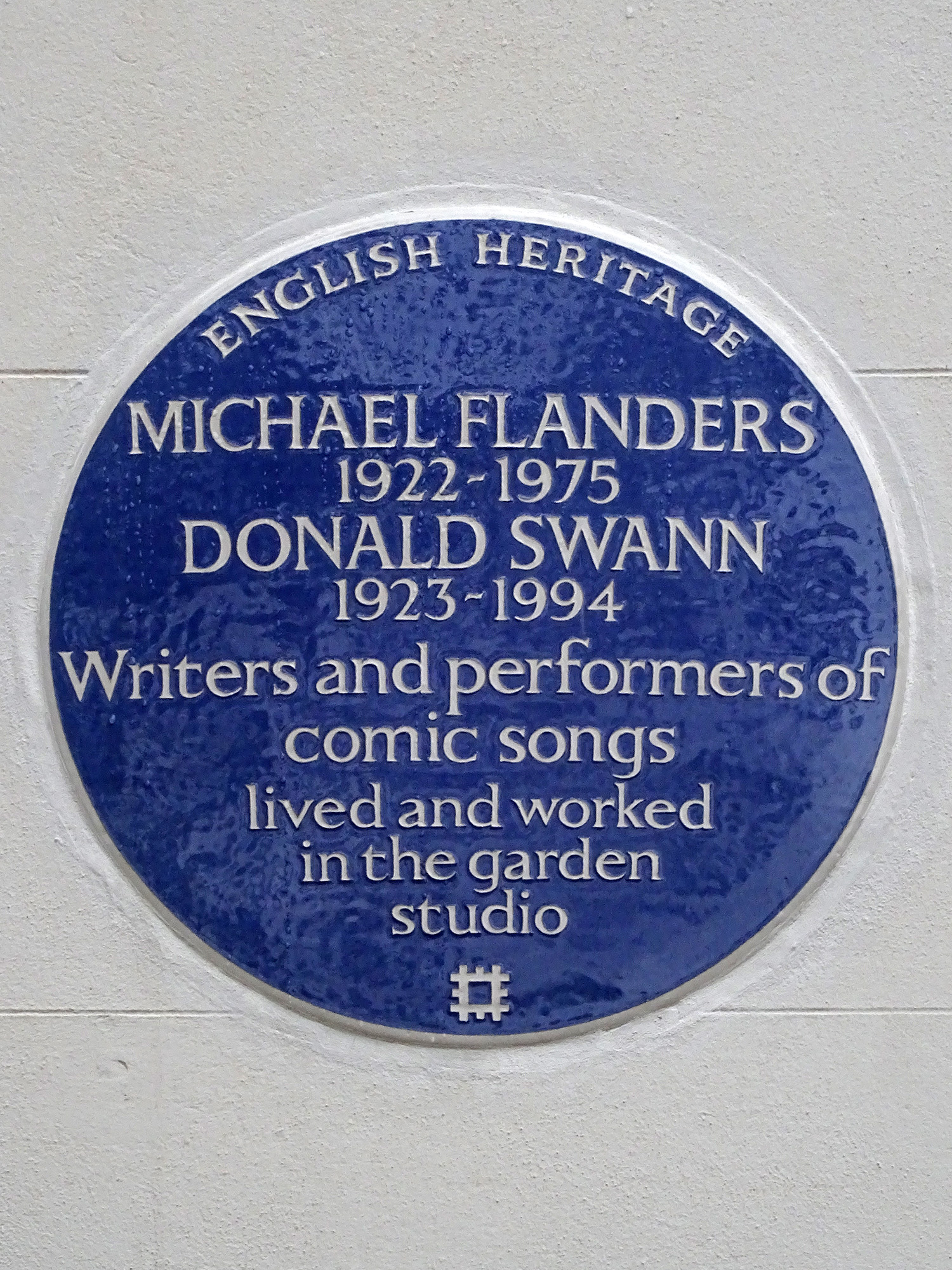
A blue plaque dedicated to Swann and Flanders in London

It is estimated that Swann wrote or set to music nearly 2,000 songs throughout his career. He wrote a number of hymn tunes which appear in modern standard hymn books. In the later years of his life he 'discovered' Victorian poetry and composed some of his most profound and moving songs, settings of William Blake, Emily Dickinson, Christina Rossetti, Oscar Wilde and others. A selection of his solo songs were recorded on a Hyperion double CD issued in 2017.

== Personal life ==
Donald Swann was married twice; he married Janet Oxborrow in 1955 and they were divorced in 1983. His second wife was the art historian Alison Smith. From 1961 until his death his address was 13 Albert Bridge Road, London SW11.

In the 1970s, Swann became a sponsor of the Peace Pledge Union.

== Death ==
In 1992 he was diagnosed with cancer. He died at Trinity Hospice in South London on 23 March 1994.

== Discography ==
=== Flanders and Swann ===
- 1957 – Excerpts from at the Drop of a Hat (EP)
- 1957 – More Excerpts from at the Drop of a Hat (EP)
- 1957 – More out of the Hat! (EP)
- 1959 – Little Drummer Boy/The Storke Carol (EP)
- 1960 – At The Drop of a Hat (produced by George Martin)
- 1961 – The Bestiary of Flanders & Swann (EP)
- 1964 – At The Drop of Another Hat (produced by George Martin)
- 1964 – Favourites from at the Drop of Another Hat (EP)
- 1964 – More out of the New Hat (EP)
- 1966 – EMI Comedy Classics (Hat and Another Hat on two cassettes)
- 1967 – The Bestiary of Flanders & Swann (produced by George Martin)
- 1975 – And Then We Wrote...
- 1977 – Tried by the Centre Court
- 1994 – The Complete Flanders & Swann (first three albums in a boxed set)
- 1994 – A Transport of Delight: The Best of Flanders & Swann
- 1997 – More out of the Drop of a Hat – Again! (double cassette)
- 1999 – The Flanders and Swann Collection
- 2000 – A Drop of Hilarity from Flanders & Swann
- 2007 – Hat Trick: Flanders & Swann Collector's Edition

=== Other audio ===
- 1951 – The Youth of the Heart (78 rpm)
- 1958 – London Sketches (Donald Swann & Sebastian Shaw)
- 1963 – Festival Matins (EP)
- 1964 – Songs of Faith & Doubt (EP)
- 1965 – For The Love of Betjeman (Donald Swann & John Betjeman, EP)
- 1966 – Donald Swann & the Choir of the Friends' School, Saffron Walden (EP)
- 1967 – Poems and Songs of Middle Earth (J. R. R. Tolkien, Donald Swann, and William Elvin)
- 1968 – Sing Round The Year (Boys of Westminster School and Girls of Mayfield Putney)
- 1970 – An Evening in Crete (Donald Swann & Lilli Malandraki)
- 1971 – The Song of Caedmon (Donald Swann & Arthur Scholey, EP)
- 1973 – A Crack in Time (The Swann Singers)
- 1973 – Wacky & His Fuddlejig (Donald Swann & Arthur Scholey, narrated by Peter Ustinov, EP)
- 1973 – The Rope of Love (The Swann Singers)
- 1975 – The Five Scrolls or "The Five Seasons of God" (Donald Swann & Rabbi Albert Friedlander)
- 1975 – The Parable of the Lost Sons (Donald Swann & The Nairobi Youth Choir, EP)
- 1980 – Radio Orwell (The Olive Quantrill Singers)
- 1981 – Swann with Topping (Donald Swann & Frank Topping)
- 1984 – Requiem for the Living (Donald Swann & Cecil Day-Lewis)
- 1989 – Alphabetaphon (Donald Swann, 3 cassettes)
- 1992 – Amiscellany (Donald Swann & John Amis)
- 1994 – Swann in Jazz
- 1999 – The Isles of Greece

== Printed music ==
- Swann, Donald; Betjeman, John (1963). A Collection of Songs. Chappell. ISBN 1-85909-003-6.
- Swann, Donald (1965). Sing Round the Year. Bodley Head. ISBN 0-370-01070-1.
- Swann, Donald; Tolkien, J. R. R. (1968). The Road Goes Ever On. Allen & Unwin. ISBN 9780047840098.
- Swann, Donald (1971). The Song of Caedmon. Stainer & Bell. ISBN 0-85249-107-7.
- Swann, Donald (1973). The Rope of Love: Around the Earth in Song. Bodley Head Children's Books. ISBN 0-370-01272-0.
- Flanders, Michael; Swann, Donald (1974). The Flanders and Swann Song Book. Chappell. ISBN 1-85909-003-6.
- Swann, Donald; illustrated by Alison Smith (1991). The Poetic Image: A Victorian Song Cycle. Albert House Press.

== Books ==
- Swann, Donald (1968). The Space Between the Bars. Hodder & Stoughton. ISBN 9780340043783.
- Swann, Donald (1975). Swann's Way Out: A Posthumous Adventure. Weidenfeld & Nicolson. ISBN 978-0297768913.
- Swann, Donald (1987). Alphabetaphon. Albert House Press. ISBN 0-9511451-1-8.
- Swann, Donald (1991). Swann's Way: A life in Song. Heinemann; Revised, Arthur James 1993. Revised, Thames Publishing 1997. ISBN 0-85305-329-4.

== Father's autobiography ==
- Swann, Herbert (1968). Home on the Neva. Victor Gollancz. ISBN 9780575001176.

== Other sources ==
- "Milestones Apr. 4, 1994". Time. 4 April 1994. 143 (14): p. 19. (obituary)
