= Children's music =

Music mainly intended for children

- Other names: Kids' music
- Stylistic origins: Nursery rhymes; educational music; easy listening

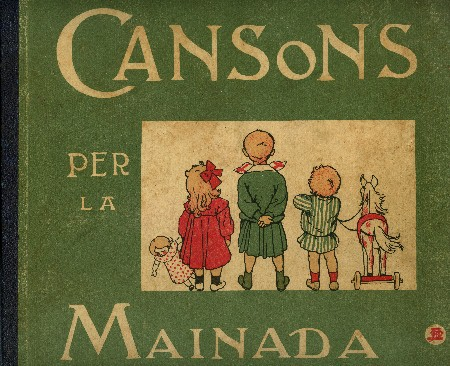
Cover of the music book Cansons per la mainada

Children's music or kids' music is music composed and performed for children. In European-influenced contexts this means music, usually songs, written specifically for a juvenile audience. The composers are usually adults.

Children's music has historically held both entertainment and educational functions. Children's music is often designed to provide an entertaining means of teaching children about their culture, other cultures, good behavior, facts and skills. Many are folk songs, but there is a whole genre of educational music that has become increasingly popular.

== History ==
=== Early published music ===
Class singing became compulsory in England with the passing of the Education Act (1870). By the early 1900s, demand for choral works for educational use had resulted in more than 50 school operettas in the catalogue of Novello, England's leading publisher of educational music. These were mostly modelled on the tuneful, humorous and morally safe operettas of Gilbert and Sullivan. Gustav Holst's Indra (1903) is an example, and other composers of reputation - such as Frederic Cowen, Arthur Somervell, Walford Davies and Percy Fletcher - also contributed to the genre.

The growth of the popular music publishing industry, associated with New York's Tin Pan Alley in the late 19th and early 20th centuries led to the creation of a number of songs aimed at children. These included 'Ten little fingers and ten little toes' by Ira Shuster and Edward G. Nelson and 'School Days' (1907) by Gus Edwards and Will Cobb. Perhaps the best remembered now is "Teddy Bears' Picnic", with lyrics by Jimmy Kennedy in 1932 and the tune by British composer John William Bratton was from 1907.

=== Early recordings for children ===
Recordings for children were intertwined with recorded music for as long as it has existed as a medium. The first words ever recorded (in 1860 by Édouard-Léon Scott de Martinville) was the first verse of the French folk/children's song "Au Clair de la Lune". In 1888, the first recorded discs (called "plates") offered for sale included Mother Goose nursery rhymes. The earliest record catalogues of several seminal figures in the recording industry such as Edison, Berliner, and Victor all contained separate children's sections.

Throughout the 1930s, 1940s, and 1950s record companies continued to produce albums for children. Such companies as RCA Victor, Decca Records, Capitol Records, and Columbia Records (among others) published albums based on popular cartoons or nursery rhymes. Recordings based on Disney films and cartoons were released at that time by RCA Victor and Capitol Records, and beginning in the late 1950s by Disneyland Records and Buena Vista Records. Often the albums were read-alongs that contained booklets that children could follow along with. Many of the biggest names in theater, radio, and motion pictures were featured on these albums, such as: Bing Crosby, Harold Peary ("The Great Gildersleeve"), Orson Welles, Jeanette MacDonald, Roy Rogers, Fanny Brice, William Boyd ("Hopalong Cassidy"), Ingrid Bergman, Danny Kaye, and Fredric March.

The role of Disney in children's cinema from the 1930s meant that it gained a unique place in the production of children's music. The first popular Disney song was 'Minnie's Yoo Hoo' (1930) the theme song from a Mickey Mouse cartoon. After the production of their first feature-length animation Snow White and the Seven Dwarfs in 1937, with its highly successful score by Frank Churchill and Larry Morey, which included the songs "Whistle While You Work", "Some Day My Prince Will Come" and "Heigh-Ho", the mould for a combination of animation, fairy tale and distinctive songs was set that would carry through to the 1970s with songs from films such as Pinocchio (1940) and Song of the South (1946).

=== Growth during the 20th century ===
The mid-20th-century arrival of the baby boomers provided a growing market for children's music as a separate genre. Woody Guthrie, Pete Seeger and Ella Jenkins were among a cadre of politically progressive and socially conscious performers who aimed albums to this group. During this time, such novelty recordings as "Rudolph the Red-Nosed Reindeer" (a Montgomery Ward jingle that became a book and later a Christmas special in 1964) and the fictional music group, The Chipmunks, were among the most commercially successful music ventures of the time ("The Chipmunk Song" was a No. 1 hit single in 1958). TV personality Bob Keeshan (Captain Kangaroo) recorded several children's albums, as did Shari Lewis.

In the 1960s, as the baby boomers matured and became more politically aware, they embraced both the substance and politics of folk ("the people's") music. Peter, Paul, and Mary, The Limeliters, and Tom Paxton were acclaimed folk artists who wrote albums for children. In 1969, the Children's Television Workshop in the U.S. launched Sesame Street. The quality of Sesame Street's children's music, much of it created by noted composers Joe Raposo and Jeff Moss, has dominated the children's music landscape to this day - the show has won 11 Grammy Awards.

At the same time jazz and pop styles began finding their way into school operas and musicals. Herbert Chappell's children's cantata The Daniel Jazz (1963) was an early example. Spurred on by its success, Novello commissioned a series of "pop cantatas" along the same lines by Michael Hurd (Jonah-Man Jazz, 1966), Andrew Lloyd Webber (Joseph and the Amazing Technicolor Dreamcoat, 1968) and Joseph Horovitz (Captain Noah and His Floating Zoo, 1970). Chappell himself followed up with a series of his own, including The Christmas Jazz, The Goliath Jazz, The Noah Jazz and The Jericho Jazz.

Children's music gained an even wider audience in the 1970s when musical features such as Schoolhouse Rock! and The Letter People were featured on network and public television, respectively. These represented an effort to make music that taught specific lessons about different subjects (math, history, and English) to youngsters through the high-quality, award-winning music. The classic PBS children's show Mister Rogers' Neighborhood had music heavily featured as well. In the late 1970s, Canadian artist Raffi, coincided with the rise of children's music as a distinct music industry genre. Musical duo Greg & Steve have focused on the positive reaction children have to music. And former Limeliter Red Grammer has performed his children's music in every state as well as 22 other countries.

Disney also re-entered the market for animated musical features, beginning with The Little Mermaid (1989) from which the song "Under the Sea" won an Oscar for best song. This was followed by successful features including Beauty and the Beast (1991, with Peabo Bryson) Aladdin (1992, with Regina Belle), and The Lion King (1994), the last of which had music by British singer Elton John and Tim Rice, and Pocahontas (1995, with Judy Kuhn), all of which were awarded best song at the Oscars.

=== Recent history ===
In the United States, children's music continues to be a force in the commercial music industry. Thus in the United States Peter Pan Records, created in 1948, was the main children's music label especially in the 1950s. Producing music or story records, the company also offered book records adapting the adventures of fictional characters like Scooby-Doo, Bugs Bunny, Popeye, etc. At one point in early 2006, the top three albums on the Billboard charts were all children's music: Disney's High School Musical soundtrack, the Kidz Bop series, and the Curious George film soundtrack. Most albums targeted nationally to children are soundtracks for motion pictures or symbiotic marketing projects involving mass-marketed acts such as The Wiggles or VeggieTales (Christian).

The 21st century has also seen an increase in the number of independent children's music artists, with acts like The Dirty Sock Funtime Band, Dan Zanes, Parachute Express, Cathy Bollinger, Imagination Movers, Laurie Berkner and Lah-Lah getting wide exposure on cable TV channels targeted to children. Trout Fishing in America has achieved much acclaim continuing the tradition of merging sophisticated folk music with family-friendly lyrics. Father Goose Music known as The King Of The Dance Party gives a mixture of Ska, Reggae, calypso and Hip-Hop while Secret Agent 23 Skidoo infuses hip-hop with family-friendly messages and imaginative stories and is known as "The King of Kid-Hop". Also recently, traditionally rock-oriented acts like They Might Be Giants have released albums marketed directly to children, such as No! and Here Come the ABCs. Jimmy Buffett simply remade his "Cheeseburger in Paradise" song into children's music with cleaned up lyrics ("Root Beer" instead of "Draft Beer"). His songs were already kid friendly with catchy lyrics and simple melodies punctuated with penny whistles and ship bell sound effects. Conversely, Koo Koo Kanga Roo, a children-oriented comedy synthpop duo, made a successful crossover from performing children's events into touring with adult rock and punk bands such as Reel Big Fish and Frank Turner. In Canada, artists such as The Kerplunks and The Oot n' Oots have paved modern pathways to the genre following in the footsteps of Raffi, Fred Penner and Sharon, Lois & Bram.

Sanitized versions of earthy songs like Harry McClintock's "The Big Rock Candy Mountains" have regularly been adapted for younger audiences. The 2008 version by Gil McLachlan re-tells the story as a child's dream, the last stanza being:

In the Big Rock Candy Mountains you're going on a holiday
Your birthday comes around once a week and it's Christmas every day
You never have to clean your room or put your toys away
There's a little white horse you can ride of course
You can jump so high you can touch the sky
In the Big Rock Candy Mountains.

Many children's stores and sometimes music outlets sell covers of pop songs, performed by adults for children, especially Christmas songs. These were especially popular during the early 2000s.

The use of children's music, to educate, as well as entertain, continued to grow, as evidenced in February 2009, when Bobby Susser's young children's series surpassed five million CD sales. In September 2016, Smithsonian Folkways Recordings label acquired the Bobby Susser series, to further the exposure of children's music that teaches as well as entertains, throughout the world.

As more children are using smartphones, tablets, laptops and smart TVs, kids' songs have entered the on-demand streaming content era. On YouTube, some children's songs have surpassed 1 billion views, easily becoming some of the most viewed YouTube videos of all time.

== See also ==
- Children's songs
- Bubblegum pop
