= Hannah Horovitz =

Hannah Horovitz (21 October 1936 – 4 March 2010) was a British classical music promoter.

Hannah Horovitz was born in Vienna, Austria, the daughter and youngest child of the publisher Béla Horovitz and his wife Lotte. Her brother Joseph Horovitz was a composer and conductor.

Her father had co-founded Phaidon Press in Vienna in 1923, with Ludwig Goldscheider, but with the rise of Nazism, they moved to London in 1938.

She started Hannah Horovitz Management in 1971, and her clients included the pianists András Schiff, Craig Sheppard and Ilana Vered, the Cleveland Quartet and the flautist Jean-Pierre Rampal.
