= Joseph Horovitz =

British composer and conductor (1926–2022)

- Born: 26 May 1926; Vienna, Austria
- Died: 9 February 2022 (aged 95) Paddington, London, England
- Occupations: Conductor and composer
- Spouse: Anna Horovitz (née Landau) (m. 1956)

Joseph Horovitz (26 May 1926 – 9 February 2022) was an Austrian-born British composer and conductor best known for his 1970 pop cantata Captain Noah and his Floating Zoo, which achieved widespread popularity in schools. Horovitz also composed music for television, including the theme music for the Thames Television series Rumpole of the Bailey, and was a prolific composer of ballet, orchestral (including nine concertos), brass band, wind band and chamber music. He considered his fifth string quartet (1969) to be his best work.

== Life and career ==
Horovitz was born in Vienna, Austria on 26 May 1926, into a Jewish family who emigrated to England via Belgium in 1938 to escape the Nazis. His father was the publisher Béla Horovitz, the co-founder in 1923, with Ludwig Goldscheider, of Phaidon Press. His sister was the classical music promoter Hannah Horovitz (1936–2010). When he was about 6 or 7, he attended the Vienna Conservatorium.

After completing his schooling at The City of Oxford High School Horovitz studied music and modern languages at New College, Oxford, where his teachers included R. O. Morris, Percy Scholes, Bernard Rose and Egon Wellesz. He later attended the Royal College of Music in London, studying composition with Gordon Jacob. Horovitz then undertook a year of further study with Nadia Boulanger in Paris. His musical career began in 1950, when he became music director at the Bristol Old Vic. He was subsequently active as a conductor of ballet and opera, and toured Europe and the United States.

Horovitz married Anna Landau in 1956, shortly after coaching at the bi-centenary celebration for Mozart and Glyndeborne. They honeymooned in Mallorca, staying in Paguera and visiting Valldemossa. He later used these two names for two clarinet pieces, based on Spanish folk-tunes he had heard there. He was Professor of Composition at the Royal College of Music from 1961, and a Council Member of the Composers' Guild of Great Britain from 1970. Between 1969 and 1996 he belonged to the board of the Performing Rights Society.

In 1959, Horovitz was awarded the Commonwealth Medal, and he received many other awards for his compositions. The city of Vienna awarded him the Gold Order of Merit in 1995. He was elected to an Honorary Fellowship of New College, Oxford in 2019. The College celebrated his 95th birthday with live-streamed performances of his 4th and 5th string quartets by the Solem Quartet, and a new string quartet commission titled Five Portraits by the composer Luke Lewis which uses musical transcriptions of Horovitz speaking about his life as its basic compositional material.

In 1981, Horovitz became a Fellow of the Royal College of Music.

Horovitz lived at Dawson Place, London. He died from myelodysplastic syndrome at St Mary's Hospital in Paddington, London, on 9 February 2022, aged 95.

== Music ==
Horovitz's works included 16 ballets, including Alice in Wonderland (1953) written for Anton Dolin's Festival Ballet Company, the dance-drama Miss Carter Wore Pink (1980) for Northern Ballet Theatre, based on the autobiographical paintings by Helen Bradley, and two one-act operas from the 1950s (The Dumb Wife, libretto Peter Shaffer, and Gentlemen’s Island, libretto Gordon Snell). There is also a more recent three-act opera, Ninotchka (2006), based on the 1939 MGM film starring Greta Garbo.

Horovitz claimed that the composers Peter Warlock, E J Moeran, Frederick Delius, and Bernard van Dieren were his influences. There are also a few significant traces of English pastoralism in his works.

There are nine concertos, many showing jazz influences. The first piece he acknowledged was the Concertante for clarinet and strings, Op. 1, written as a student work using Weber's Clarinet Concertino as his template. The Violin Concerto (1950) is one of his most serious works, directly influenced by his studies with Nadia Boulanger. Others include the Clarinet Concerto (1956), the Euphonium Concerto (perhaps his most overtly popular concerto in style), and the Jazz Concerto for piano, strings and percussion (1966). The latter was originally composed for George Malcolm to play on the harpsichord and combines jazz and baroque styles. Many of Horovitz's most substantial pieces were written for wind orchestra and brass band, starting with the Sinfonietta in 1968. Ad Astra for concert band was commissioned by the RAF in 1990 and drew on the composer's memory of London in The Blitz.

The first three string quartets were student works (the third accepted as the final part of his Oxford Bachelor of Music degree in 1948). The fourth, described by the composer as "dark and disturbing", was composed in 1953 following four years of work on mostly light-hearted music for ballet and opera. His fifth string quartet, which according to Daniel Snowman is "probably his most profound work", was first performed to honour the 60th birthday of Ernst Gombrich at the Victoria and Albert Museum in 1969 by the Amadeus Quartet.

The children's "pop cantata" Captain Noah and His Floating Zoo (1970) was his biggest popular success. The libretto by Michael Flanders is an adaptation of the Biblical tale of Noah found in Genesis chapters 6–9. It is one of a series of similar cantatas commissioned for school use by the publishers Novello, including The Daniel Jazz (1963) by Herbert Chappell, Jonah-Man Jazz (1966) by Michael Hurd and Joseph and the Amazing Technicolor Dreamcoat by Andrew Lloyd Webber (1968). The piece was first recorded by the Kings Singers in 1972 on an Argo LP, and a new orchestral version by the composer was conducted by John Wilson in 2018. An environmental cantata, Summer Sunday, followed in 1975, commissioned for the Cookham Festival. His music for television included Lillie, Rumpole of the Bailey, The Search for the Nile, The Fight Against Slavery, Wessex Tales and Partners in Crime.

His more serious religious vocal works included the psalm setting Sing unto the Lord a New Song (1971), which was the first work commissioned from a Jewish composer for the choir of St Paul's Cathedral. The oratorio Samson for voices and brass band followed in 1977, a commission from the National Brass Band Championships of Great Britain.

== Works ==
=== Orchestral works ===
- 1948 Concertante for Clarinet and Strings, Op. 1
- 1950 Violin Concerto, Op. 11
- 1956 Clarinet Concerto
- 1963 Trumpet Concerto
- 1965 Jazz Concerto (Harpsichord or Piano)
- 1971 Sinfonietta for Light Orchestra
- 1972 Horizon Overture
- 1973 Adagio Cantabile
- 1973 Valse
- 1976 Bassoon Concerto
- 1977 Jubilee Toy Symphony
- 1993 Oboe Concerto

=== Works for wind orchestra and brass band ===
- 1964 Three Pieces From Music Hall Suite for brass band
- 1968 Sinfonietta for brass band
- 1972 Euphonium Concerto for euphonium and brass band
- 1975 The Dong with a Luminous Nose for brass band
- 1983 Ballet for Band for brass band
- 1984 Bacchus on Blue Ridge: Divertimento for wind orchestra
- 1985 Concertino Classico for 2 cornets (or trumpets) and brass band
- 1989 Tuba Concerto for tuba and brass band
- 1989 Wind Harp for concert band
- 1990 Ad Astra for concert band
- 1991 Fete Galante for wind orchestra
- 1992 Dance Suite
- 1994 Theme and Cooperation for brass band

=== Film and television scores ===
- 1963 Tarzan's Three Challenges
- 1971 The Search for the Nile
- 1973 Wessex Tales
- 1975 The Fight Against Slavery
- 1976 The Picture of Dorian Gray
- 1978 Lillie
- 1978 Rumpole of the Bailey
- 1980 Why Didn't They Ask Evans?
- 1981 Seven Dials Mystery
- 1983 Agatha Christie's Partners in Crime
- 1987 A Dorothy L. Sayers Mystery

=== Dramatic ===
- 1952 Les Femmes d'Alger: Ballet in one act
- 1953 The Dumb Wife: Comic opera in one act
- 1953 Alice in Wonderland: Ballet in two acts
- 1958 Concerto for Dancers: Ballet in one act
- 1958 Gentleman's Island (libretto by Gordon Snell) in English or German for tenor, baritone and chamber orchestra
- 1961 Horrortorio (words by Alistair Sampson from a scenario by Maurice Richardson) for soloists, chorus and orchestra. It was performed at the Hoffnung Astronautical Musical Festival
- 1965 Let's Make a Ballet: Ballet in one act
- 1970 Captain Noah and His Floating Zoo: Cantata (text by Michael Flanders) for mixed chorus with piano, double bass and percussion
- 1970 Lady Macbeth Scena for mezzo-soprano and piano
- 1975 Summer Sunday: a comical-tragical-ecological Pastoral for mixed choir and piano
- 1977 Samson: oratorio for baritone, mixed chorus and brass band
- 1980 Miss Carter Wore Pink: Ballet in one act
- 2006 Ninotchka: a three-act opera

=== Chamber music ===
- 1948 String Quartet No. 3
- 1953 String Quartet No. 4
- 1956 Sonatina, op. 3 for oboe and piano
- 1957 Quartet for oboe and strings, Op. 18
- 1962 Fantasia on a Theme of Couperin for wind nonet or 11 solo strings
- 1964 Music Hall Suite for brass quintet
- 1970 Ghetto Song for solo guitar
- 1976 Brass Polka for brass quartet
- 1969 String Quartet No. 5
- 1981 Sonatina For Clarinet and Piano
