= Michael Hurd =

Michael Hurd may refer to:

- Michael Hurd (composer) (1928–2006), English composer
- Michael Hurd (priest) (born 1944), Dean of Nelson
- Michael Hurd (runner), road runner and winner of the Reading Half Marathon in 1984
