= Towards the End of the Morning =

1967 novel by Michael Frayn

- First UK edition
- Author: Michael Frayn
- Cover artist: Charles Gorham
- Language: English
- Genre: Satirical novel
- Publisher: Harvill Press (UK); Viking Press (US)
- Publication date: 1967
- Publication place: United Kingdom
- Media type: Print (Hardback & Paperback)

Towards The End Of The Morning is a 1967 satirical novel by Michael Frayn about journalists working on a British newspaper during the heyday of Fleet Street.

Its protagonists work to compile the miscellaneous, unimportant parts of the newspaper – the "nature notes" column, the religious "thought for the day", the crossword and so on. The paper seems sunk in a state of torpor, and the journalists' work is extremely dull. Feeling their lives and careers are stalled, they spend most of their day complaining about work and dreaming of better things. John Dyson, the lead protagonist, longs to work in television, and is at last given his chance towards the end of the book. However, fate seems determined to thwart him.

Towards was Frayn's third book after The Tin Men and The Russian Interpreter, and is based on his experiences at The Observer, where he worked from 1962 to 1968.

A central theme of the book is Dyson's struggle against what he sees as encroaching entropy – indeed, the book was published in the United States under the title Against Entropy.
