= Angela Leighton =

British literary scholar and poet

Angela Leighton FBA
- Born: 23 February 1954 (age 72); Wakefield, Yorkshire, England

Academic background
- Education: St Hugh's College, Oxford

Academic work
- Discipline: Literary scholar
- Sub-discipline: Victorian literature; twentieth-century English literature; Elizabeth Barrett Browning; Percy Bysshe Shelley; poetry
- Institutions: University of Hull; University of Cambridge; Trinity College, Cambridge

Angela Leighton, FBA (born 23 February 1954) is a British literary scholar and poet, who specialises in Victorian and twentieth-century English literature. Since 2006, she has been a Senior Research Fellow at Trinity College, Cambridge. Previously, from 1979 to 2006, she taught at the University of Hull, rising to be Professor of English.

== Early life and education ==
Leighton was born on 23 February 1954 in Wakefield, Yorkshire, England, to the composer Kenneth Leighton and Lydia Leighton (née Vignapiano). She studied at St Hugh's College, Oxford, and graduated with a Bachelor of Arts (BA) degree in 1976 and a Master of Letters (MLitt) degree in 1981.

== Academic career ==
In 1979, Leighton joined the English Department of the University of Hull. She was a lecturer from 1979 to 1993, a senior lecturer from 1993 to 1995, Reader in English from 1995 to 1997, and Professor of English from 1997 to 2006. In 2006, she moved to the University of Cambridge where she is a Senior Research Fellow of Trinity College, Cambridge.

== Honours ==
In 2000, Leighton was elected a Fellow of the British Academy (FBA), the United Kingdom's national academy for the humanities and social sciences. She delivered the 2002 Warton Lecture on English Poetry.

== Selected works ==
=== Scholarly works ===
- Leighton, Angela (1984). Shelley and the Sublime: An Interpretation of the Major Poems. Cambridge: Cambridge University Press. ISBN 978-0521250894.
- Leighton, Angela (1986). Elizabeth Barrett Browning. Sussex: Harvester Press. ISBN 978-0710805720.
- Leighton, Angela (1992). Victorian Women Poets: Writing against the Heart. Charlottesville: University Press of Virginia. ISBN 978-0813914268.
- Leighton, Angela; Reynolds, Margaret, eds. (1995). Victorian Women Poets: An Anthology. Oxford: Blackwell. ISBN 978-0631176084.
- Leighton, Angela (2007). On Form: Poetry, Aestheticism, and the Legacy of a Word. Oxford: Oxford University Press. ISBN 978-0199290604.
- Leighton, Angela, ed. (2010). Voyages Over Voices: Critical Essays on Anne Stevenson. Liverpool: Liverpool University Press. ISBN 978-1846314841.
- Leighton, Angela (2017). Trinity Poets (edited with Adrian Poole). Carcanet.
- Leighton, Angela (2018). Hearing Things: The Work of Sound in Literature. Belknap Press of Harvard University Press.
- Leighton, Angela, ed. (2022). Walter de la Mare: Critical Appraisals (edited with Kajita and Nickerson). Liverpool University Press.

=== Poems ===
- Leighton, Angela (2000). A Cold Spell. Nottingham: Shoestring Press. ISBN 978-1899549405.
- Leighton, Angela (2007). Sea Level. Beeston, Nottingham: Shoestring Press. ISBN 978-1904886648.
- Leighton, Angela (2012). The Messages. Beeston, Nottingham: Shoestring Press. ISBN 978-1907356308.
- Leighton, Angela (2016). Spills. Manchester: Carcanet Press. ISBN 978-1847772251.
- Leighton, Angela (2021). One, Two. Manchester: Carcanet Press.
