= The Daniel Jazz =

The Daniel Jazz can refer to two musical works:

- The Daniel Jazz (1925), an orchestral piece by Louis Gruenberg
- The Daniel Jazz (1963), a short vocal work with music by Herbert Chappell
