= Now You Know =

Now You Know may refer to:

- "Now You Know" (Desperate Housewives), the premiere episode of Desperate Housewives season four
- Now You Know (novel), a 1993 novel by British author Michael Frayn
- Now You Know (album), a 2002 album released by Doug Martsch of Built to Spill
- Now You Know (film) a 2002 film directed by Jeff Anderson
- "Now You Know", a song by Ab-Soul from the 2016 album Do What Thou Wilt.
- "Now You Know", a song by The Afghan Whigs from their 1993 album Gentlemen
- "Now You Know", a song by Anaïs Mitchell from the 2022 album Anaïs Mitchell
- "Now You Know", a song by Bobby Troup and recorded by The Four Freshmen
- "Now You Know", a song from Stephen Sondheim's musical Merrily We Roll Along
- "Now You Know", a song by American punk band 2Cents, off their album Dress To Kill
- "Now You Know", a song by "Weird Al" Yankovic from the 2022 film Weird: The Al Yankovic Story: See Weird: The Al Yankovic Story (soundtrack)
- Now You Know, the longest-running TV show on UGBC-TV at Boston College
