= The Sneeze (play) =

Play by Michael Frayn

The Sneeze is a 1988 play by Michael Frayn, based on four short stories and four one-act plays by Anton Chekhov.
