= Afterlife (play) =

2008 play by Michael Frayn

- Premiere image
- Written by: Michael Frayn
- Original language: English
- Subject: Life and career of Austrian theatrical director Max Reinhardt

Premiere
- Date premiered: 11 June 2008
- Place premiered: National Theatre
- Official website

Afterlife is a 2008 play by Michael Frayn. It tells the life and career of Austrian theatrical director and actor Max Reinhardt, from the revival of the Salzburg Festival in 1920, which he helped to re-establish, until his death in New York in 1943. It draws from Hugo von Hofmannsthal's 1911 play Jedermann (based on the sixteenth-century English morality play, Everyman), which Reinhardt directed at the Salzburg Festival for many years following its revival in 1920.

Afterlife was first performed in the Lyttelton auditorium of the National Theatre, London, on 11 June 2008. The play polarized critics.

The National Theatre production was directed by Michael Blakemore. The cast included Roger Allam as Max Reinhardt, Abigail Cruttenden as his mistress (and, later, wife) Helene Thimig, Selina Griffiths as his personal assistant Gusti Adler, Peter Forbes as his man of business, Rudolf 'Katie' Kommer, Glyn Grain as his valet Franz, David Burke as the Prince Archbishop of Salzburg, and David Schofield as Friedrich Müller.
