= Skios =

2012 comic novel by Michael Frayn

- First edition
- Author: Michael Frayn
- Language: English
- Genre: Farce
- Publisher: Faber & Faber (UK); Metropolitan Books (US)
- Publication date: May 01 2012 (UK); June 19, 2012 (US)
- Publication place: United Kingdom
- Media type: Print
- Pages: 272 pgs
- ISBN: 0-571-28141-9

Skios is a 2012 comic novel by Michael Frayn. The novel was published in May 2012 by Faber & Faber in the UK and by Metropolitan Books the following month in the US. It centres on a group of individuals on the fictional Greek island of Skios.

== Synopsis ==
When it's announced that the keynote address of an influential foundation will be given by Dr. Norman Wilfred, everyone expects him to live up to his reputation as being an intimidating man with a dry personality. Much to everyone's surprise, Wilfred is not only charming but is also young and handsome – much to the delight of foundation organizer Nikki. However at the other end of the island Nikki's friend Georgie is trapped with a rather unpleasant individual... who also goes by the name of Dr. Norman Wilfred and has lost everything he owns other than a lecture on his speciality, scientometrics.

== Reception ==
Critical reception for Skios has been mixed, with a reviewer for the Guardian criticizing the characters as "bland" and "by-the-numbers". Common criticisms of the book included negative comparisons to Frayn's earlier works and skepticism over the idea of mistaken identity "in the age of Google images". Praise for Skios centered on the book's usage of the "niceties of class" and lightheartedness.
