= Harvey Miller (publisher) =

British publisher

Harvey Miller (1925–2008) was a British publisher, who took over as director of the Phaidon Press on the death of his father-in-law, Béla Horovitz, in 1955. He was born in the East End of London as the son of Fanny and Barnet Miller, and the second of four children. They all moved to Tel Aviv, when he was eight, and ran the Yarkon Hotel there. Miller won an open scholarship to St Catharine's College, Cambridge, from where he graduated in 1945 with a bachelor's degree in natural sciences. In 1949, he married Elly Horowitz, the daughter of the publisher Béla Horovitz, co-founder of the Phaidon Press, and took over as its director in 1955 on the death of his father-in-law.

He founded Harvey Miller Publishers with his wife in 1968. Today Harvey Miller Publishers is an imprint of Brepols.
