= Balmoral (play) =

First edition (publ. Methuen)

Balmoral (aka Liberty Hall) is a 1987 farcical play by British playwright Michael Frayn. It is set in an alternate history 1937 Britain, which experienced a communist revolution in 1917. The royal residence at Balmoral Castle hosts a commune of writers in poor living conditions, who are thrown into conflict when a Russian capitalist journalist visits to interview an author who has gone missing. Frayn rewrote Balmoral several times to try to make the play's fanciful premise believable enough to support a farce.

The play was re-staged in 2009, starring Rik Mayall and directed by Alan Strachan.
