= Béla Horovitz =

Hungarian-born British publisher

Béla Horovitz (8 April 1898 – 8 March 1955) was a Hungarian-born British publisher, and the co-founder in 1923, with Ludwig Goldscheider, of Phaidon Press.

Bela Horovitz was born in Budapest. He was the co-founder in Vienna in 1923, with Ludwig Goldscheider and Frederick "Fritz" Ungar, of the publishing house Phaidon Verlag. In 1938, following the rise of the Nazis, Horovitz and his wife, Lotte, and their children moved to London. Phaidon Verlag was re-established there as Phaidon Press.

Their youngest child was the classical music promoter Hannah Horovitz. Their son Joseph Horovitz was a composer and conductor.

In 1949, their daughter Elly married Harvey Miller, who joined Phaidon Press, and after Horovitz's death in 1955, succeeded him as its director.
