= Sweet Dreams (novel) =

1973 novel by Michael Fray

- First edition cover
- Author: Michael Frayn
- Genre: Fantasy
- Publisher: Viking Press
- Publication date: January 3, 1973

Sweet Dreams is a 1973 novel by English writer Michael Frayn. The book follows a middle-class intellectual man, Howard Baker, who dies and ends up in a middle-class intellectual version of heaven, where he and his circle of middle-class intellectual friends have jobs such as designing the Alps and creating man. Howard moves through a series of more or less trite philosophical positions before finally going to work for God.

== Reception ==
David Pringle included Sweet Dreams as Number 53 in his 1988 book, Modern Fantasy, The Hundred Best Novels. Pringle called it, "a beautifully sustained satire on the limitations of middle-class good intentions, reasonableness, decency, selflessness, moderation, fairness, sound common sense, and all-around good-chappery." He went on to say that it is "impeccably written, profound (and perhaps depressing) in its implications, and very, very funny."
