= Now You Know (novel) =

1993 novel by Michael Frayn

First edition (publ. Viking Press)

Now You Know is a 1993 novel by British author Michael Frayn.

== Plot ==
Set in Westminster where OPEN Campaign is a pressure group run by Terry Small for open government. He is asking questions to the government about the 'Hassam Case', the death of an Asian man in police custody. Hilary Wood works as a civil servant in the Home Office and is struggling to prevent the case from escalating. She then meets Terry has an affair with him, and decides to send him details about the case, so Hilary resigns from the service. Then Terry offers her a job in the OPEN Campaign. His organisation has many secrets of its own which makes openness difficult...

== Reception ==
- Christopher Lehmann-Haupt from The New York Times praises the novel 'At first, Now You Know seems to be a farce of miscommunication in the tradition of the author's successful stage and screen hit, Noises Off, and previous novels of his like The Trick of It and A Landing on the Sun. It runs along on rapid-fire switches in point of view that almost invariably betray misunderstanding...But the further you get into "Now You Know," the more you find that the fun of reading it lies less in its comedy and more in its outrageous philosophical unity. Every detail in it obsessively addresses the paradox that no matter how open people try to be, no one can know anyone completely."
- Joseph Coates is also positive in The Chicago Tribune: 'Deftly using a shifting first-person point-of-view method that can jump-cut from mind to mind in alternating chapters, or even in paragraphs within chapters, Frayn makes the novel a tour de force of conflicting and self-contradictory motivations...Half farce, half tragedy and all social comedy, Now You Know (a title that the book simultaneously affirms and denies, just like a trapped politician) gives a psychological map of how we live now that's as much fun as a Monopoly board.'
- D. J. Taylor writing in The Independent has reservations 'this is a fine, accomplished, witty novel. Here, regrettably enough, lies its undoing. One begins the book anticipating a tremendous satire on official secrecy and bureaucratic wool-pulling, only to end up contemplating a gentle comedy greatly concerned with the nuances of English social life. None of this is helped by the predictable nature of the ironies, most of them connected with offices' conspiratorial atmosphere...There is also the question of the style. The novel is done in a series of first-person narratives, taking in most of the cast. Generally this has the effect of reducing the individuality of the characters, rather than confirming it...While there are some good things in Now You Know - in particular Terry's unexpected fight with moral responsibility - the lack of ambition is pervasive.'
