= Captain Noah and His Floating Zoo =

Children's cantata

- by Joseph Horovitz
- Cover of the vocal score
- Genre: Pop cantata
- Text: by Michael Flanders
- Based on: Genesis 6–9
- Composed: 1970
- Publisher: Novello & Co,
- Scoring: Choir, piano, with optional percussion and brass

Captain Noah and His Floating Zoo (1970) is a children's cantata composed by Joseph Horovitz in a popular style for unison or two-part voices and piano, with optional bass and drums. The libretto by Michael Flanders is an adaptation of the Biblical tale of Noah found in Genesis chapters 6–9.

== Context ==
The piece is one of a series of "pop cantatas" commissioned for school use and published by Novello, including The Daniel Jazz (1963) by Herbert Chappell, Jonah-Man Jazz (1966) by Michael Hurd and Joseph and the Amazing Technicolor Dreamcoat by Andrew Lloyd Webber (1968). Horovitz had seen a performance of Joseph and had been impressed. When Novello asked him to compose something in the same vein, suggesting Noah as a subject, Horovitz agreed, only provided Flanders would provide the libretto. It was an immediate success in schools, but also appealed to adult choirs and was soon adapted for ballet and stage shows.

== Synopsis ==
A close reading of the Genesis story, Captain Noah and His Floating Zoo lightheartedly chronicles the adventures of Noah, charged by God to build an ark in order to preserve mankind and all the creatures of Earth.

The work opens with God voicing his displeasure with man ("There's nothing but sinning, wickedness and violence there! / Remind me to wash mankind right out of my hair!"). Noah is then commanded to build an ark of gopher wood and fill it with pairs of animals—one male and one female—in spite of the constant mocking by the sinful citizens of Fun City ("Noah! Noah! Don't do any more! Your boat's a laughing stock! / Ha! Ha! But Noah went right on building the ark, and his hammer went knock, knock, knock!"). Accompanied by a Latin-American samba rhythm, Noah and his family then load the ark with one pair of every animal imaginable "from antelope to zebra...one pair of each, just as the Lord had planned."

Aboard the ark, forty days and forty nights of ceaseless rain takes its toll, but the mood changes both dramatically and musically when the rain finally stops. Spirits begin to lift while the musical accompaniment shifts from percussive, raindrop-like figures to a swaying gesture reminiscent of gentle ocean waves. As the floodwaters subside, Noah enlists a terrified raven to scout for dry land. Following a short, unsuccessful survey of the watery landscape the affrighted raven succumbs to a moment of literary allusion croaking "Nevermore!" (invoking Edgar Allan Poe's 1845 poem, The Raven).

The following week a dove is sent forth and subsequently returns with an olive branch, an indication of dry land. Shortly thereafter, God commands Noah to emerge from the ark ("Come out with your wife and your sons and daughters there / and set the animals free and the birds of the air"). The work closes with a waltz as God avows never to send another flood, a pledge confirmed by the newly created rainbow ("This is my promise to you, the rainbow overhead: violet, indigo, blue and green, all the colours that lie between / violet, indigo, blue and green, / yellow, orange and red!").

== Performance ==
Captain Noah and His Floating Zoo was conceived as an accommodating work. In the Preface to the Novello edition the authors indicate that they "hope it will be useful wherever and whenever groups of singers and musicians need a work of some length to perform together, and that they will arrange, divide and adapt it (within reason) as best suits their available talent and the occasion."

The instrumental possibilities are similarly wide-ranging. Instrumental accompaniment may vary, including solo piano and/or guitar with any of the following instruments: bass, drums, maracas, claves, tambourines and other percussion instruments for special effects. The work, however, does not rely on special effects or other theatrical devices as it was originally conceived as a choral piece. Nevertheless, the authors acknowledge, "semi-dramatic effects or stagings may suggest themselves."

Captain Noah was recorded by The King's Singers (Argo 1972,) reissued Dutton Vocalion 2005 as CDLF8120). One of the ensemble's earliest recordings, the performance features the composer at the piano. The work was also commercially recorded as an animated version intended for television broadcast (1972; VHS, 1978).

In late 2016 the Zemel Choir began a Kickstarter campaign to create an animated version of Captain Noah.

== Reception ==
Captain Noah and His Floating Zoo has become a favourite among sacred and secular institutions alike. Relatively short (about twenty-six minutes) and intended for children, the work has been successfully adapted for adult performers, with the aforementioned recording by The King's Singers being one such example.

The work received the 1976 Ivor Novello Award for the Best British Work for Children. The Birmingham Post critic Kenneth Dommett stated, "Joseph Horovitz's Captain Noah and His Floating Zoo is an established favourite wherever and however it is performed...the immensely witty and skilful libretto by Michael Flanders makes it a sure-fire winner."
