= Audience (play) =

Audience is a 1991 play by British playwright Michael Frayn.

The play works on the idea that the characters in the play are actually watching the audience, expecting them to perform. The playwright of the "play" is also in the audience. The comedy ensues as Frayn holds a mirror up to the audience, and they see their own foibles as audience members.

The characters are Joan, an elderly woman in her sixties, who is not entirely focused on playing with her daughter, Helena, in her forties. Charles pays more attention to his companion than to the play. His companion, Amanda, is terrified of seeing anyone she knows with Charles.

Bobbie is an American lady in her fifties who is with her fellow American husband, Merrill, in his seventies. Quentin is a drama teacher who is with a drama student, Lee, who does not want to be there. Eileen, Reginald, and Wendy are a family. Wendy does not want to be there, but it is her birthday treat.

== Characters ==
The Usherette — An usherette who doesn't enjoy her job and just tries to get it done with haste. Often makes mistakes.

Joan — An elderly woman taken to see a show by her daughter Helena. Gets distracted often and is not entirely concentrating on the show. Notices a man in the Audience who looks very familiar.

Helena — A woman in her thirties or forties taking her mother, Joan out to see a play. She is embarrassed when she realizes the play is very sexual. She is worried about her husband Christopher, who is in the wild with his friend Charles.

Charles — A very suave man who is taking his girlfriend Amanda out on a date to the theater. His wife believes he is at his Wildlife with his friend Christopher.

Amanda — A woman who is being taken on a date with her boyfriend Charles to the theatre while her husband is in Germany. Is constantly worried that someone she knows will see her on her affair with Charles.

Quentin — A man who enjoys going to the theatre and only came to see this show in order to see this one actor he adores. He later discovers that his favorite actor has been replaced by an understudy.

Lee — Quentin's protégé, he is taking AP Drama and has to sit through a play with Quentin. He doesn't enjoy it until a teenage girl named Wendy arrives and grabs his attention.

Merrill — A senile old man who cannot help but fall asleep all the time. He often says random non-sequitur things.

Bobbie — Merrill's elderly wife, who spends most of her time and energy keeping her husband in line.

Reginald — A stressed, beta-male husband who arrives late with his wife and daughter.

Eileen — Reginald's equally stressed, "bitchy" wife who constantly gives Reginald abuse.

Wendy — A very shy teenager who reluctantly goes to watch a play with her embarrassing parents.
