= The Trick of It =

First edition (publ. Viking Press)

The Trick of It is a 1989 novel by Michael Frayn.

== Plot ==
It is written in the form of a series of letters to a colleague in Melbourne and tells the story of an academic working in English Literature who specialises in the works of an older famous contemporary feminist woman writer. She comes to visit his college and they sleep together that night. In the morning she leaves, and he pursues her hoping to resume the relationship; they eventually marry. She presently begins to write about his family, and especially his mother. He makes unsuccessful attempts to get her to change the structure of this work.
