= Headlong (Frayn novel) =

1999 novel by Michael Frayn

First edition (publ. Faber) featuring Bruegel's Landscape with the Fall of Icarus

Headlong is a novel by Michael Frayn, published in 1999. The plot centres on the discovery of a long-lost painting from Pieter Bruegel's series The Months. The story is essentially a farce, but contains references to a large amount of scholarship, most prominently the work of Erwin Panofsky, about the Bruegel's work. Following Panofsky, Frayn distinguishes between the iconology and iconography of the paintings and suggests that rather than simply being a series of pastoral images they symbolise a Flemish populace undergoing great suffering as a result of Spanish rule.

The novel was shortlisted for the 1999 Booker Prize. An abridged version by Paul Kent and read by Martin Jarvis was first broadcast on BBC Radio 4 in 1999. A dramatized radio play directed by Clive Brill and produced by Ann Scott was broadcast on BBC Radio 4 in 2013.

== Plot ==
Martin, the main character, is supposed to be writing a book. He finds himself invited to dinner at the house of a repellent and warring couple, on whom the land and property they own seems entirely wasted. Martin happens on a painting which he takes to be by Bruegel. Painstaking research leads him (via a full scale reassessment of the interpretation of the five surviving pictures in Bruegel's The Months) to identify the picture as the missing sixth picture of Bruegel's famous book of hours. Meantime his wife, (an actual art historian whereas he is only peripherally connected with the scholarly art world), and their baby live in a cottage and he fears his wife eyes him with increasing disdain as, instead of working on his book, he pursues the Bruegel data.

Martin has to fake the promise of an affair with the woman of the house to get hold of the picture, and indulge in a series of implausible transactions in other pictures to keep his access to the Bruegel open. Once he gets it, his troubles have only begun. Finally, as he is about to succeed in taking it to a safe place and secure his fortune, he crashes the old Land Rover and the picture goes up in smoke. It is not revealed whether it is a Bruegel.

== Critical review ==
Kudritskaya (2023) argues that Frayn's use of language, the structure of his narrative, and the way he develops his characters are helpful in his exploration of a series of key themes in the study of art. These are the issues of both authenticity and meaning and to illuminate the interplay between the subjective nature of artistic perception, interpretation, and appreciation. Kudritskaya suggests that these features help make Frayn's novel useful for inclusion in courses in English Literature and in the wider public debates about the role of art and the relationships between reality and perception.(Kudritskaya, 2023, p. 120 and 132)

Other critical reviews include:

- Uçar, A. S. (2024). Rediscovering Bruegel: Art and History in Michael Frayn’s Headlong. Gaziantep University Journal of Social Sciences, 23(3), 972-984.
- Natallia, D. (2010). Types of ecphrastic descriptions in Headlong. Тропа, (4), 33-39.
- Falkenburg, R. L. (2017). “Headlong” into Pieter Bruegel’s Series of the Seasons. In The Primacy of the Image in Northern European Art, 1400–1700 (pp. 80-89). Brill.

== Scholars discussed ==
In addition to Panofsky the following scholars are referenced: Gustav Glück; Charles de Tolnay;Max Jakob Friedländer
