= A Very Private Life =

1968 novel by Michael Frayn

- First edition
- Author: Michael Frayn
- Language: English
- Genre: Science fiction
- Publisher: Collins
- Publication date: 1968
- Publication place: United Kingdom
- Media type: Print (Hardcover)
- Pages: 192 p.

A Very Private Life by Michael Frayn (1968) is a futuristic fairy tale that describes a young woman's futile quest to make meaningful contact with another human being.

== Plot summary ==
The protagonist (Uncumber) begins life in a privileged home where she is estranged from her family by their reliance on drugs to regulate their emotions and social interactions. She leaves them in order to pursue a man (Noli) that she falls in love with on first sight despite a language barrier existing between them, which stops her from forming any relationships with him or his family. Noli, unlike Uncumber, is from a working class background. Uncumber finally abandons him when he insists on using the drugs which she abhors in their love making. She finally makes it full circle when she is picked up shortly afterwards by the police and imprisoned in a room remarkably similar to the one in which she began and is eventually reconciled to a medicated life, where every emotion exists on tap and the most intimate experience is sex, which has been replaced by lying next to the other's lover experiencing entirely private and separate hallucinations.

== Style ==
The novel is stylistically unusual in that it is written mainly in the present tense. For example, a typical passage reads: "He turns his head from side to side, and then nods at her. Uncumber realises that he wants her to do the same. She feels herself blushing at the ridiculousness of it."

Occasionally, the narrative also uses future tense (for example, the book's opening line is "Once upon a time there will be a little girl called Uncumber"), however it eschews the past tense normally expected in novels.

Frayn said it was his least favorite novel of his works.
