= A Landing on the Sun =

1991 novel by Michael Frayn

A Landing On The Sun
- First edition (publ. Viking Press)
- Author: Michael Frayn
- Language: English
- Publisher: Viking Press
- Publication date: 1991
- ISBN: 0-670-83932-9 (first edition)
- Dewey Decimal: 823.914
- LC Class: PR6056.R3 L36

A Landing On The Sun is a 1991 novel by Michael Frayn, and was the Sunday Express Book of the Year. It was adapted into a 1994 BBC TV fim with a screenplay written by the author.

== Synopsis ==
Jessel, a British civil servant working in the Cabinet Office, has been asked to investigate the unexplained death of Summerchild, also a civil servant, whose body was found outside the Admiralty some 15 years earlier, in 1974. His investigations reveal that Summerchild was involved in the setting up of a 'Strategy Unit' reporting directly to the Prime Minister Harold Wilson. (The book predates by 10 years the establishment by Tony Blair of his Strategy Unit in 2001.)

Jessel combs through the Strategy Unit's files, and discovers that the Unit was supposed to advise the government on matters relating to "quality of life", and to this end an Oxford philosopher, Serafin, was appointed to lead it. But Wilson's intentions were not accurately conveyed to Serafin, who set out instead to investigate the nature of happiness, using the Socratic method in a series of tutorial-like discussions with Summerchild. Jessel begins to suspect that their discussions have led them in a quite different, more personal direction from what was intended.

== Adaptation ==
The novel was adapted for television as part of the Screen Two anthology series. It was transmitted on BBC2 in 1994. The film was directed by Nicholas Renton and produced by David Snodin. The cast included Robert Glenister, Susan Fleetwood, Roger Allam and Judith Scott.
