= Phaidon Press =

British book publisher

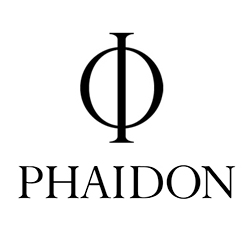
- Founded: 1923
- Founder: Fritz Ungar, Bela Horovitz and Ludwig Goldscheider
- Country of origin: Austria
- Headquarters location: London and New York City
- Distribution: Penguin Random House Distribution (UK, AU); Hachette Client Services (US) LKG (DE); SODIS (FR); CB (NL); OLF (CH) Messaggerie Libri (IT); Jonathan Ball Publishers (ZA)
- Key people: Philip Ruppel (CEO); Deborah Aaronson (VP, group publisher); Siobhan Bent (VP, global marketing and communications); James Booth-Clibborn (managing director); Julia Hasting (creative director)
- Nonfiction topics: Art, Photography, Design, Architecture, Fashion, Food, Travel
- Revenue: £26.5 (2018)
- No. of employees: 139 (2021)
- Official website: phaidon.com

Phaidon Press is a global publisher of books on art, architecture, design, fashion, photography, and popular culture, as well as cookbooks, children's books, and travel books. The company is based in London and New York City, with additional offices in Paris and Berlin. With over 1,500 titles in print, Phaidon books are sold in over 100 countries and are printed in English, French, Spanish, German, Italian, Mandarin, and dozens of other languages. Since the publisher's founding in Vienna in 1923, Phaidon has sold almost 50 million books worldwide.

== Early history ==
Phaidon-Verlag was founded in 1923 in Vienna, Austria, by Ludwig Goldscheider, Béla Horovitz, and Frederick "Fritz" Ungar. Originally operating under the name "Euphorion-Verlag", the founders settled on Phaidon (the German form of Phaedo), named after Phaedo of Elis, a pupil of Socrates, to reflect their love of classical antiquity and culture. The company's distinctive logo derives from the Greek letter phi, which represents the golden ratio, employed by artists, architects, and designers since the fourth century BC. Originally, the publisher's backlist was mainly literary in nature. Its first two publications consisted of a thin, four-volume print edition of the works of Shakespeare and a two-volume edition of Plato. Horovitz took over sole ownership in 1924. From 1923 to 1925 it largely published classics, e.g. works by William Wordsworth, Jonathan Swift, Ovid, Novalis, Friedrich Schiller, Johann Wolfgang von Goethe, Theodor Storm or Heinrich von Kleist (including again a thin print edition of Kleist's Complete Works, with text arranged by Goldscheider). In the years that followed, the program was expanded to include works by more contemporary authors such as Thomas Mann, Hanne Back, and translations by Samuel Butler, until finally, from 1927/1928, the program turned largely towards only publishing contemporary literature. Works by the German writer Alfred Henschke (Klabund) were printed in high numbers, as were works by Arnold Zweig, Hugo Salus, Hugo von Hofmannsthal, Knut Hamsun, Heinz Liepmann, and Richard Specht. From its offices in Schulerstraße 10, Phaidon also eventually became known throughout Europe for its affordable, high-quality books about art and architecture. Its large-format art books first emerged in 1937 with the publication of books featuring works by Vincent van Gogh, Sandro Botticelli, and the French Impressionists.

== Move to England and revival ==
To avoid the effects of the impending Nazi annexation of Austria, Goldscheider and Horovitz sold the company to British publisher George Allen & Unwin in 1937. Phaidon-Verlag was removed from the Austrian commercial register on May 31, 1939. Both men subsequently emigrated to London, where they reestablished the imprint as the Phaidon Press, eventually becoming a leading British art book publisher. In 1955, during a stay in New York, Horovitz suffered a heart attack and died at the age of 56, upon which the leadership at Phaidon was assumed by his son-in-law, Harvey Miller. A decade later, in 1967, Phaidon was acquired by Frederick A. Praeger Inc, a subsidiary of Encyclopædia Britannica. Goldscheider remained director of the Phaidon Press until his death in London in 1973.

From 1974 to 1981, Phaidon was owned by Elsevier, when it was sold in a management buyout under the name Musterlin. It was acquired by entrepreneur Richard Schlagman in 1990 and its headquarters returned to London in May 1991. Schlagman then hired renowned designer Alan Fletcher in 1993 to be the creative lead. In 1998, Fletcher brought on board the German designer Julia Hasting, who began focusing on conceptual book design, emphasizing the art book as an object. This approach was translated into the architecture and photography books, as well as the cookery program. Leon Black acquired Phaidon in 2012. Phaidon acquired the online art-sales business Artspace. In January 2020, it acquired the publishing house The Monacelli Press from its founder.

== Publishing categories ==
=== Architecture ===
Phaidon publishes monographs on the work of twentieth-century masters including Marcel Breuer, Le Corbusier, Mies van der Rohe, Alvar Aalto, and Eero Saarinen. It also publishes monographs on contemporary international architecture practices, for example on Tadao Ando, Peter Marino, John Pawson, MAD, and Snøhetta.

Phaidon also publishes historical and geographical surveys on architecture. In 2004, it published the giant format Atlas of Contemporary World Architecture, followed by The Phaidon Atlas of 21st Century World Architecture, Atlas of Brutalist Architecture, and Atlas of Mid-Century Modern Houses.

=== Art ===
Phaidon also publishes monographs on established and emerging artists, as well as surveys of contemporary and historical art movements and genres. The company has published two of the world's best selling art surveys: The Story of Art, Ernst Gombrich's narrative survey of the history of art from ancient times to the modern era, which has sold over 8 million copies and has been translated into over 40 languages and released in 18 editions since it was first published in 1950; and The Art Book, which presents the work of 600 artists from different periods, schools, visions, and techniques, from medieval to modern times. In 1947–1960 the firm published the series Phaidon Pocket Books which comprised "titles with an art and literary bent", in 1969–79 it published the Phaidon Colour Plate Series, and from the early 1970s published the Colour Library which the Antiques Trade Gazette described as "a good introduction to nearly 50 key artists and movements in art history".

The program includes nonfiction writers, including Alain de Botton, Martin Gayford, and Calvin Tomkins. Phaidon has published monographs on Anthony Caro, Lucian Freud, Olafur Eliasson, Ellsworth Kelly, Willem de Kooning, Agnes Martin, Bruce Nauman, Harland Miller, and JR. Phaidon has worked with The Andy Warhol Foundation for the Visual Arts since 1977 to publish The Andy Warhol Catalogue Raisonné, which currently spans five volumes.

Phaidon's Contemporary Artists series, launched in 1996, features over 70 titles. Recent publications in the series include Kerry James Marshall, Yayoi Kusama, Frank Stella, Wolfgang Tillmans, Sarah Sze, and Mark Bradford. Phaidon works with the online art marketplace Artspace to create limited editions of its books.

=== Children ===
Phaidon publishes children's books in a wide range of formats including illustrated nonfiction, picture books, and interactive board books. Phaidon's children's book program is partly inspired by the company's traditional publishing categories and is designed to meet the developmental needs and interests of specific age groups. Phaidon publishes children's books by authors and illustrators including Gabrielle Balkan, Jason Fulford and Tamara Shopsin, Sara Gillingham, Jean Jullien, Lotta Nieminen, Chris Raschka, JR, Julia Rothman, Joshua David Stein, Hervé Tullet, and Tomi Ungerer.

=== Design ===
Phaidon publishes monographs on product, furniture, and graphic designers, design histories, and, since 2014, surveys on interior, garden, and floral design. These include monographs on the work of Dieter Rams, Ettore Sottsass, Stefan Sagmeister, James Irvine, Naoto Fukasawa, nendo, Verner Panton, Richard Sapper, and Harry Bertoia.

=== Fashion ===
Phaidon publishes monographs on designers and fashion houses, as well as surveys of contemporary and historical fashion. It publishes the best selling The Fashion Book and has collaborated on monographs with creative directors Grace Coddington and Fabien Baron; designers Marc Jacobs, Viktor & Rolf, and Thierry Mugler; and fashion house Yves Saint Laurent, among others.

=== Food ===
Phaidon has published monographs with some of the world's leading chefs including Massimo Bottura, Magnus Nilsson, Enrique Olvera, Virgilio Martínez, René Redzepi, and Ferran Adrià, with whom it published the seven-volume set 2005–2011.

Phaidon publishes surveys of world cuisines, a program launched in 2005 with the Italian cookbook The Silver Spoon. Other world cuisines published include American, Chinese, Cuban, French, German, Greek, Japanese, Mexican, Nordic, Peruvian, Spanish, Thai, and Turkish. In 2013 Phaidon published Where Chefs Eat, a global dining guide based on chef recommendations. The series has been extended and adapted to include Where to Eat Pizza, Where to Drink Coffee, Where to Drink Beer, and Where Bartenders Drink.

In 2025, Phaidon published Recipes From the American South.

=== General interest ===
Phaidon publishes books on popular culture, such as its bestselling advice books by leading creative voices, including It's Not How Good You Are, It's How Good You Want to Be by Paul Arden and Damn Good Advice by George Lois. The ongoing "Explorer" series features thematic visual surveys on a range of nonfiction subjects including maps, plants, astronomy, animals, and anatomy.

=== Photography ===
Phaidon publishes monographs and collections of photography, as well as limited editions that include a signed and numbered print. Artists published by Phaidon include Lauren Greenfield, Stephen Shore, Martin Parr, Nan Goldin, Robert Mapplethorpe, Joel Meyerowitz, Mario Sorrenti, Steve McCurry, and Annie Leibovitz, with whom the company has published two books: Annie Leibovitz: Portraits 2005–2016 and an updated edition of Annie Leibovitz: At Work. Phaidon also publishes limited-edition books that include signed and numbered photographic prints.

=== Wallpaper* City Guides ===
Phaidon publishes Wallpaper* City Guides. There are currently over 50 guides in print. Wallpaper* City Guide apps were launched in 2011 and there are currently over 50 available to download in one container app across Apple and Android Platforms.
