= Spies (novel) =

2002 novel by Michael Frayn

- First edition
- Author: Michael Frayn
- Language: English
- Publisher: Faber & Faber
- Publication date: 1 April 2002
- Publication place: United Kingdom
- Media type: Print (hardback & paperback)
- Pages: 302 pp (hardback edition) & 272 pp (paperback edition)
- ISBN: 0-571-21286-7 (hardback edition) & ISBN 0-571-21296-4 (paperback edition)
- OCLC: 48236279

Spies (2002) is a psychological novel by English author and dramatist Michael Frayn. It is currently studied by A-Level, and some GCSE, literature students in various schools. It is also studied by some Year 12 VCE English students in Australia.

== Synopsis ==
Narrating in the form of a bildungsroman, an elderly man, Stefan Weitzler, reminisces about his life during the Second World War as he wanders down the now modernised London cul-de-sac that he once called home.

Now a young boy, Stephen, regularly bullied at school and bored with his home life, is informed by his best friend Keith Hayward, a snobbish and domineering neighbour, that Keith's mother is an undercover operative working for the Germans. As the two boys spy on Mrs. Hayward from a hiding place in the hedges, they notice her unusual daily routine: leaving Keith's house with a picnic basket full of food, tapping on the window of Auntie Dee (Mrs. Hayward's sister, next-door-neighbour and best friend, whose husband, Uncle Peter, is away in the RAF), and walking through to the end of the cul-de-sac where she disappears into the nearby town. When the boys follow her, they cannot find her in any of the shops; and when they get back to their hiding place, Mrs. Hayward is already ahead of them, walking back into Keith's house.

When snooping in Keith's mother's room, they find her diary which contains a small 'x' marked on a day of every month (in reference to her menstrual cycle). The boys' naïveté leads them to believe that 'x' is another secret agent that Mrs. Hayward has meetings with each month. One day, the boys realise that Keith's mother does not turn left into the town every day, but instead turns right into a grimy tunnel that leads to a disused field. Later that night, Stephen goes through the tunnel and finds a box in the field that contains a pack of cigarettes. When Keith opens the packet, a slip of paper pops out with a single letter written on it: X. Another night, Stephen sneaks out to the tunnel and goes to the box once again; this time some clean clothes are inside. As he is looking through them, somebody appears behind him. Stephen is too scared to turn around and holds his breath hoping that he isn't noticed. Still holding a sock, Stephen runs away as soon as he cannot hear the sound of breathing behind him. His family are outside looking for him and are furious.

The next day, when Keith is doing homework, Mrs. Hayward visits Stephen in his hiding place in the bushes and tells him that she knows he is following her, and that he should stop now before he gets hurt. Despite this, Stephen shows Keith the sock, not telling him about Mrs. Hayward's warnings, and says that they need to uncover the truth before Keith's mother's next meeting with 'x'.

The next day, the boys revisit the field where they find the box empty. A few feet ahead of them they see something hiding under an iron sheet – a vagabond. Keith and Stephen take bars and smash at the sheet until finally realising they may have killed the vagabond. They run and bump into Keith's mother in the tunnel. She holds back Stephen and tells him since he is not going to stop spying on her, he will have to do her favours for the man in the field. Stephen realises that Mrs. Hayward is not a German spy, but in fact helping the vagabond whom she has taken under her care.

Stephen discovers the tramp is dying while taking eggs and milk to him, and is asked to give a silk map to Mrs. Hayward to show the man's love for her. However, Stephen is too scared to do so and later that night sees the police taking him away on a stretcher, his face badly mutilated after being hit by a train. Fifty years later, Stephen ties up the loose ends, explaining that the vagabond was in fact Uncle Peter who had gone AWOL and was carrying out an affair with Keith's mother while dying from war wounds. As well as this, it turns out that there was a German spy living in the cul-de-sac: Stephen's father, although he was actually working for the British.

In a subplot, Stephen finds an ally in Barbara Berrill, a girl close in age to himself who lives in his neighbourhood. Barbara reveals information that proves crucial to Stephen's unravelling of the mysteries that he has been investigating.

== Characters ==
Stephen Wheatley
A shy boy who finds himself drawn into Keith's games and is a frequent target of school bullies. Details in the story suggest that Stephen has obsessive–compulsive disorder, and that he is sexually attracted to Barbara.
Geoff Wheatley
Stephen's older brother.
Keith Hayward
A snobbish, domineering child with a worryingly vicious streak, possibly inspired by the cruelty his father bestows upon him whenever he misbehaves. His inherent snobbery has alienated most other children and his parents seem to largely ignore him, so in a sense he relies on Stephen for companionship, although he frequently condescends to and mistreats him.
Mrs Hayward
A mysterious character, implied as being very attractive. She vanishes for various amounts of time throughout the day for no apparent reason, leading her son to believe that she may be an undercover operative. She has a distant relationship with her husband and seems vaguely scared of him.
Mr Hayward
A deeply introverted man, who spends most of his time in his shed working on various mechanical projects. He mostly ignores Keith, and only acknowledges Stephen's existence when it is apparent that he knows something he should not. He has a peculiar hold on his wife and is subtly conveyed as quite a nasty, mean-spirited individual. His anger at being unable to fight in the war like the rest of the men is channelled into a very calm (but all the more threatening) persona.
Barbara Berrill
A school peer of Keith and Stephen, Barbara shows an interest in Stephen and occasionally accompanies him on his adventures. She often appears bossy and annoys Stephen, although it appears that he may have a slight crush on her.
Deirdre Berrill
Barbara's older sister. She meets with Geoff.
Auntie Dee
Mrs Hayward's sister, whom she sees every day. Described as very bubbly and a frequent smiler.
Uncle Peter
Auntie Dee's husband, a handsome young man currently fighting abroad. He has garnered a reputation as a war hero.
Milly
The baby daughter of Dee and Peter.

== Critical reactions ==
Spies was mostly well-received by the literary community, with many critics praising Frayn for his creative and original approach.

Once published, Spies went on to win the 2002 Whitbread Novel of the year for achievement in literary excellence, and the 2002 Bollinger Everyman Wodehouse Prize for comic literature.

== See also ==
- Michael Frayn
