= The Russian Interpreter =

1966 novel by Michael Frayn

- First edition
- Author: Michael Frayn
- Language: English
- Publisher: Collins (UK); Viking Press (US)
- Publication date: 1966
- Publication place: England
- Pages: 222

The Russian Interpreter is the second novel by English author Michael Frayn, published in 1966 by Collins in the UK and by Viking Press in the US. It won the Hawthornden Prize in 1967. Frayn was himself an interpreter in Moscow in the 1950s.

== Plot summary ==
Paul Manning is writing a thesis at Moscow University, where he meets visiting British businessman Gordon Proctor-Gould who speaks no Russian - Paul becomes his paid interpreter. Paul then falls in love with Raya and introduces her to Gordon. Raya and Gordon immediately hit it off, Gordon invites her to stay the night and Raya agrees, to Paul's chagrin. Gordon and Raya live in a hotel room; Gordon imposing rules on Raya which she just ignores. Paul still interprets between them hoping that Raya will leave Gordon. Then Raya starts to steal Gordon's belongings and books, and the situation escalates as Gordon and Paul try to stop Raya and uncover the truth. Paul suspects that Gordon may also have something to hide.

== Reception ==
- Kirkus Reviews praises the novel: "this literate intrigue is full of quirky, quixotic surprises and it will catch your curiosity and convert it into admiration.
- Time states that "Michael Frayn won entree by studying as an exchange student at Moscow University. As a result, his sprightly book shines with an eerily realistic glow." and concludes that "The implication is that Proctor-Gould is now spying for the Russians. But is he really? Frayn doesn't say. The effect is illogical but somehow appropriate, as it is, perhaps, in real-life espionage."
- Brandon Robshaw in The Independent writes "this novel conveys the atmosphere of that time: seedy, cold, grumbling, paranoid. Yet this is a funny novel. Frayn focuses on the absurdities of this bleak world and makes comedy of it, just as Isherwood did for 1930s Berlin. Manning is a first-rate comic protagonist, observant yet innocent, rather like one of Evelyn Waugh's put-upon heroes. A short novel, but a highly enjoyable one, with characters that jump off the page. It’s a great pity that Michael Powell, who was going to make a film of it, never did.
