= Michael Frayn =

English playwright, novelist (born 1933)

Michael Frayn FRSL
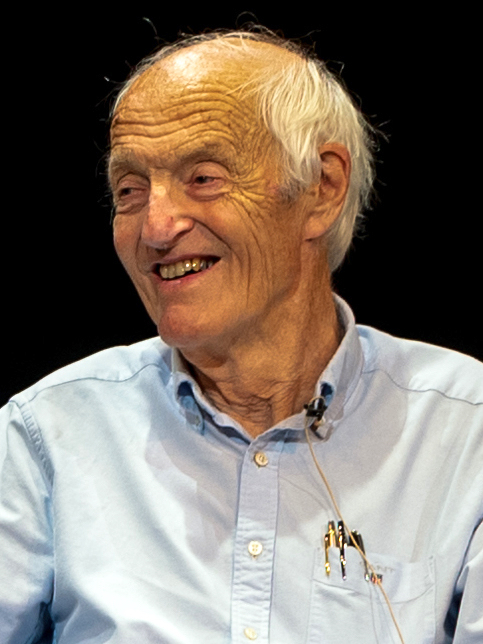
- Frayn at the 2023 Chiswick Book Festival
- Born: 8 September 1933 (age 93); Mill Hill, Middlesex, England
- Education: Kingston Grammar School; Joint Services School for Linguists; Emmanuel College, Cambridge
- Occupations: Reporter; columnist; novelist; playwright; screenwriter
- Spouse(s): Gillian Palmer Claire Tomalin (m. 1993)
- Children: 3, including Rebecca
- Relatives: Finn Harries (grandson); Jack Harries (grandson)
- Writing career
- Period: 1962–present
- Genres: Farce, historical fiction, philosophy
- Notable awards: Somerset Maugham Award; Laurence Olivier Award; International Emmy Awards; Critics' Circle Theatre Awards; Tony Award; Commonwealth Writers' Prize; Golden PEN Award; Whitbread Prize

Michael Frayn, FRSL (/freɪn/; born 8 September 1933) is an English playwright and novelist. He is best known as the author of the farce Noises Off and the dramas Copenhagen and Democracy.

Frayn's novels, such as Towards the End of the Morning, Headlong, and Spies, have also been critical and commercial successes, making him one of the handful of writers in the English language to succeed in both drama and prose fiction. He has also written philosophical works, such as The Human Touch: Our Part in the Creation of the Universe (2006).

== Early life ==
Frayn was born in Mill Hill, north London (then in Middlesex), to Thomas Allen Frayn, an asbestos salesman from a working-class family of blacksmiths, locksmiths and servants, and his wife Violet Alice (née Lawson). Violet was the daughter of a failed palliasse merchant; having studied as a violinist at the Royal Academy of Music, she worked as a shop assistant and occasional clothes model at Harrods. Frayn's sister also supported the family by working at Harrods, as a children's hairdresser.

Frayn grew up in Ewell, Surrey, and was educated at Kingston Grammar School. Following two years of National Service, during which he learned Russian at the Joint Services School for Linguists, Frayn read Moral Sciences (Philosophy) at Emmanuel College, Cambridge, graduating in 1957. He then worked as a reporter and columnist for The Guardian and The Observer, where he established a reputation as a satirist and comic writer, and began publishing his plays and novels.

== Theatre work ==
Frayn's play Copenhagen deals with a historical event, a 1941 meeting between the Danish physicist Niels Bohr and his protégé, the German Werner Heisenberg, when Denmark is under German occupation, and Heisenberg is—maybe?—working on the development of an atomic bomb. Frayn was attracted to the topic because it seemed to 'encapsulate something about the difficulty of knowing why people do what they do and there is a parallel between that and the impossibility that Heisenberg established in physics, about ever knowing everything about the behaviour of physical objects'. The play explores various possibilities.

Frayn's more recent play Democracy ran successfully in London (the National Theatre, 2003-4 and West End transfer), Copenhagen and on Broadway (Brooks Atkinson Theatre, 2004-5); it dramatised the story of the German chancellor Willy Brandt and his personal assistant, the East German spy Günter Guillaume. Five years later, again at the National Theatre, it was followed by Afterlife, a biographical drama of the life of the great Austrian impresario Max Reinhardt, director of the Salzburg Festival, which opened at the Lyttelton Theatre in June 2008, starring Roger Allam as Reinhardt.

Frayn's other original plays include two evenings of short plays, The Two of Us and Alarms and Excursions, the philosophical comedies Alphabetical Order, Benefactors, Clouds, Make and Break and Here, and the farces Donkeys' Years, Balmoral (also known as Liberty Hall), and Noises Off, which critic Frank Rich wrote in his book The Hot Seat "is, was, and probably always will be the funniest play written in my lifetime."

== Novels ==
Frayn's novels include Headlong (shortlisted for the 1999 Booker Prize), The Tin Men (won the 1966 Somerset Maugham Award), The Russian Interpreter (1967, Hawthornden Prize), Towards the End of the Morning, Sweet Dreams, A Landing on the Sun, A Very Private Life, Now You Know and Skios (long-listed for the Man Booker Prize in 2012). His novel Spies was long-listed for the Man Booker Prize and won the Whitbread Prize for Fiction in 2002.

== Non-fiction ==
Frayn has written a book about philosophy, Constructions, and a book of his own philosophy, The Human Touch.

Frayn's columns for The Guardian and The Observer (collected in At Bay in Gear Street, The Day of the Dog, The Book of Fub and On the Outskirts) are models of the comic essay; in the 1980s a number of them were adapted and performed for BBC Radio 4 by Martin Jarvis.

Frayn has also written screenplays for the films Clockwise, starring John Cleese, First and Last starring Tom Wilkinson, Birthday, Jamie on a Flying Visit, and the TV series Making Faces, starring Eleanor Bron.

== Translation ==
Frayn learned Russian during his period of National Service. Frayn is now considered to be Britain's finest translator of Anton Chekhov (The Seagull, Uncle Vanya, Three Sisters and The Cherry Orchard), including an early untitled work, which he titled Wild Honey (other translations of the work have called it Platonov or Don Juan in the Russian Manner). From four of Chekhov's short stories and four of his one-act plays Frayn devised The Sneeze (originally performed on the West End by Rowan Atkinson).

Frayn has also translated Yuri Trifonov's play Exchange, Leo Tolstoy's The Fruits of Enlightenment, and Jean Anouilh's Number One.

== Television ==
In 1980, Frayn presented the Australian journey of the BBC television series Great Railway Journeys of the World. His journey took him from Sydney to Perth on the Indian Pacific, with side visits to the Lithgow Zig Zag and a journey on The Ghan's old route from Marree to Alice Springs shortly before the opening of the new line from Tarcoola to Alice Springs.

== Personal life ==
Frayn has three daughters with his first wife, Gillian Palmer: Rebecca, a documentary film maker, writer and actress; Susanna; and Jenny, a television producer. Frayn and his second wife, Claire Tomalin, a biographer and literary journalist, live in Petersham, London.

== Awards ==
- 1966: Somerset Maugham Award, for The Tin Men
- 1975: London Evening Standard Award (Best Comedy), for Alphabetical Order
- 1976: Laurence Olivier Award (Comedy of the Year), for Donkeys' Years
- 1980: London Evening Standard Award (Best Comedy), for Make and Break
- 1982: London Evening Standard Award (Best Comedy), for Noises Off
- 1982: Laurence Olivier Award (Comedy of the Year), for Noises Off
- 1984: London Evening Standard Award (Best Play), for Benefactors
- 1986: New York Drama Critics' Circle Award (Best Foreign Play), for Benefactors
- 1990: International Emmy Awards (Best Drama), for First and Last (BBC)
- 1991: Sunday Express Book of the Year, for A Landing on the Sun
- 1998: Critics' Circle Theatre Awards (Best New Play), for Copenhagen
- 1998: London Evening Standard Award (Best Play), for Copenhagen
- 2000: Tony Awards (Best Play), for Copenhagen
- 2000: New York Drama Critics' Circle Award (Best Foreign Play), for Copenhagen
- 2002: Whitbread Novel Award, for Spies (the 2002 Whitbread Book of the Year Award went to his wife Claire Tomalin)
- 2002: Bollinger Everyman Wodehouse Prize for Spies
- 2003: Commonwealth Writers' Prize (Europe and South Asia Best Book), for Spies
- 2003: London Evening Standard Award (Best Play), for Democracy
- 2003: Golden PEN Award
- 2005: Honorary DLitt from the University of Birmingham
- 2006: St. Louis Literary Award from the Saint Louis University Library Associates

Frayn is an honorary associate of the National Secular Society, and declined a CBE and a knighthood in 1989 and 2003 respectively.

== Bibliography ==
=== Novels ===
- The Tin Men (1965)
- The Russian Interpreter (1966)
- Towards the End of the Morning (US title: Against Entropy) (1967)
- A Very Private Life (1968)
- Sweet Dreams (1973)
- The Trick of It (1989)
- A Landing on the Sun (1991)
- Now You Know (1993)
- Headlong (1999)
- Spies (2002)
- Skios (2012)

=== Plays ===
==== Original ====
- The Two of Us, four one-act plays for two actors (1970) Black and Silver, Mr. Foot, Chinamen, and The new Quixote
- Alphabetical Order (1975)
- Donkeys' Years (1977)
- Clouds (1977)
- Balmoral (1978; revised 1980 as Liberty Hall, revised 1987)
- Make and Break (1980)
- Noises Off (1982)
- Benefactors (1984)
- The Sneeze (1988), based on short stories and plays of Chekhov
- First and Last (1989)
- Listen to This: Sketches and Monologues (1990)
- Jamie on a Flying Visit; and Birthday (1990)
- Look Look (1990)
- Audience (1991)
- Here (1993)
- La Belle Vivette, a version of Jacques Offenbach's La Belle Hélène (1995)
- Alarms and Excursions: More Plays than One (1998)
- Copenhagen (1998)
- Democracy (2003)
- Afterlife (2008)
- Matchbox Theatre: Thirty Short Entertainments (2014), ISBN 9780571313938

==== Translated ====
- The Cherry Orchard, from Chekhov (1978)
- The Fruits of Enlightenment, from Tolstoy (1979)
- Three Sisters, from Chekhov (1983, revised 1988)
- Number One, from Jean Anouilh's Le Nombril (1984)
- Wild Honey, from Chekhov (1984)
- The Seagull, from Chekhov (1986)
- Uncle Vanya, from Chekhov (1986)
- Exchange, adapted from Yuri Trifonov (1990)

==== Anthologies ====
- Plays: One (1985), ISBN 978-0413592804 – contains: Alphabetical Order; Donkey's Years; Clouds; Make and Break; Noises Off
- Plays: Two (1991), ISBN 978-0413660800 – contains: Balmoral; Benefactors; Wild Honey
- Plays: Three (2000), ISBN 978-0413752307 – contains: Here; Now You Know; La Belle Vivette
- Plays: Four (2010), ISBN 9781408128626 – contains: Copenhagen; Democracy; Afterlife

=== Short fiction ===
- Speak After The Beep: Studies in the Art of Communicating With Inanimate and Semi-Animate Objects (1995).

=== Non-fiction ===
- The Day of the Dog, articles reprinted from The Guardian (1962).
- The Book of Fub, articles reprinted from The Guardian (1963).
- On the Outskirts, articles reprinted from The Observer (1964).
- At Bay in Gear Street, articles reprinted from The Observer (1967).
- The Original Michael Frayn, a collection of the above four, plus 19 new Observer pieces.
- Constructions, a volume of philosophy (1974).
- Celia's Secret: An Investigation (US title The Copenhagen Papers ), with David Burke (2000).
- The Human Touch: Our part in the creation of the universe (2006).
- Stage Directions: Writing on Theatre, 1970–2008 (2008), his path into theatre and a collection of the introductions to his plays.
- Travels with a Typewriter (2009), a collection of Frayn's travel pieces from the 1960s and '70s from The Guardian and the Observer.
- My Father's Fortune: A Life (2010), a memoir of Frayn's childhood.
- Among Others: Friendships and Encounters (2023), another memoir.
