= Michael Hurd (priest) =

Anglican dean in New Zealand

Michael (John) Hurd was the Dean of Nelson from 1981 until 1993.

He was born in 1944, educated at the University of Otago and ordained in 1968. After curacies in Anderson's Bay and Tauranga he was Vicar of Tapanui.
