= Ludwig Goldscheider =

Austrian-British publisher and art historian

- Born: Vienna, Austria; 6 March 1896
- Died: 26 June 1973 (aged 77)
- Occupations: Publisher, art historian, poet and translator
- Known for: Co-founding Phaidon Press (with Bela Horovitz)
- Spouse: Blanca Goldscheider (m. 1927)
- Parent(s): Wilhelm Goldscheider, Julie (Itte) Goldscheider, née Lifschitz

Ludwig Goldscheider (3 June 1896 – 26 June 1973) was an Austrian-British publisher, art historian, poet and translator who is known for founding the world-renowned Phaidon Press.

== Biography ==
Goldscheider was born in Vienna, then capital of the Austro-Hungarian Empire, to Wilhelm Goldscheider, a clockmaker from Galicia, and his first wife Julie (Itte) Goldscheider, née Lifschitz. After serving as an officer in the First World War, Goldscheider studied art history at the University of Vienna under Julius von Schlosser, and began working in various publishing houses. His first book, Die Wiese ("The Meadow"), an anthology of lyric poetry, appeared in 1921.

Goldscheider co-founded Phaidon Press in 1923 under the German name Phaidon Verlag, with Béla Horovitz and Frederick "Fritz" Ungar. Phaidon Verlag became known throughout Europe for its inexpensive high-quality books about art and architecture. Goldschieder had a son with Muriel Breaks in 1941. The son's name is Jupiter 'Peter' Breaks, living in Mountain, Ontario, Canada.

Goldscheider emigrated to London in 1938 due to the Anschluss. He and Horovitz re-established the Phaidon Press in Britain, where they published, among many other art books, Ernst Gombrich's famous The Story of Art. Goldscheider stayed with the company for 35 years as author, editor and book-designer. After Horovitz's death Goldscheider took over general management of the company.

He was married to Blanca Goldscheider, sister-in-law of Elfriede Geiringer (wife of Otto Frank – father of Anne Frank).

== Selected works ==
- Michelangelo. Paintings, Sculpture, Architecture. Phaidon Press, London 1996, ISBN 0-7148-3296-0.
- Rodin. Sculptures. Phaidon Press, Oxford 1988, ISBN 0-7148-9000-6.
- Roman Portraits. Phaidon Press, London 2004, ISBN 0-7148-4436-5.
- Die schönsten Gedichte der Weltliteratur. Ein Hausbuch der Weltlyrik, von den Anfängen bis heute. Phaidon Verlag, Wien 1934
- Die Wiese. Gedichte. Amalthea-Verlag, Wien 1921.

His papers are held at the Getty Research Institute.
