= The Tin Men =

1965 novel by Michael Frayn

First edition (publ. Collins)

The Tin Men is a novel by Michael Frayn, published in 1965. It won the Somerset Maugham Award the following year.

It concerns the lives of workers at William Morris Institute for Automation Research. This is itself a joke as William Morris was all in favour of hand-working. Goldwasser is working on the automation of newspapers and has invented UHL (Unit Headline Language) to this end. This consists of taking standard headline words and creating headlines from them. Examples such as "Strike Threat Probe" and "Lab Row Looms" produce sentences that everybody recognises but nobody can explain the meaning of.

Goldwasser is obsessed with trying to work out whether or not he is cleverer than Macintosh, a co-worker doing research in the automation of morality. Hugh Rowe is supposed to be working on sport automation but is writing a novel. He has no idea of the plot or characters and spends all his time writing ecstatic reviews of the non-existent novel and glowing portraits of himself as the author. Nunn the security officer has a mania with sport, doesn't understand the 24-hour clock and is constantly confusing himself with his own elaborate codes, the meaning of which he forgets. He suspects Goldwasser of being up to something in the weeks preceding a visit by the Queen to open a new wing of the Institute. Nunn reports to Chiddingfold, the chief of the Institute, who never speaks. Nobbs is the token working class worker at the institute and calls everybody 'Mate'. Riddle is a heavy smoking woman whom Nunn also finds suspicious because of her friendship with Goldwasser.
