= Herbert Chappell =

British composer (1934–2019)

Herbert Chappell in 1984

Herbert Reginald Chappell (18 March 1934 – 20 October 2019) was a British conductor, composer and film-maker, best known for his children's cantata The Daniel Jazz and for his television scores.

== Education and early career ==
Born in Bristol, Herbert Chappell's first musical training was as a chorister in the cathedral. At Oriel College, Oxford he briefly studied music with Egon Wellesz. His contemporaries there included Richard Ingrams, Ken Loach and Dudley Moore, and Chappell wrote incidental music for many college theatre productions. Following Oxford he taught for several years at Cumnor House Sussex school in Haywards Heath. The headmaster there, Hal Milner-Gulland, encouraged him to produce music that would engage the interest of his pupils. (Chappell dedicated The Daniel Jazz to him in 1963). In 1962 Chappell joined the BBC Home Service, introducing the Adventures in Music series and presenting music programmes for BBC radio schools programming.

== Children's cantatas ==
Herbert Chappell's children's cantata The Daniel Jazz, settting a pre-existing text by Vachel Lindsay, is a short vocal work suitable for school choirs, consisting of songs about people and events from the Book of Daniel in the Old Testament (which covers the period when the Jews were deported and exiled to Babylon by the Babylonian king Nebuchadnezzar). It was first performed at Cumnor House School, Haywards Heath (where Chappell was teaching) in 1960 and published by Novello in 1963. A televised performance the following year took the piece to a mass audience for the first time. Widely performed in schools during the 1960s and 1970s, it was privately recorded in 1972 by Hazelgrove Junior School in Hatfield, and commercially recorded in 1974 by the Southend Boys' Choir.

Spurred on by its success, Novello commissioned a series of "pop cantatas" along the same lines. The most successful of these were by Michael Hurd (Jonah-Man Jazz, 1966), Andrew Lloyd Webber (Joseph and the Amazing Technicolor Dreamcoat, 1968, in its initial, 20 minute version) and Joseph Horovitz (Captain Noah and His Floating Zoo, 1970). Many other examples followed throughout the 1970s.

In 1970 London Weekend Television commissioned Chappell and writer Tracey Lloyd (born 1939) to produce a series of six Biblical pop cantatas under the umbrella title 'All That Jazz' for broadcast in 1971, along with a new broadcast of The Daniel Jazz. They were: The Goliath Jazz, The Noah Jazz, The Red Sea Jazz, Jericho Jazz, The Nazarath Jazz and The Prodigal Son Jazz.

== Music for television ==
As a television director and producer, Chappell first made his mark with a BBC Two Workshop series of eleven documentaries on classical music, which ran from 1964 until 1969. A highlight included Leonard Bernstein conducting the London Symphony Orchestra in a rehearsal of Shostakovich's Fifth Symphony.

For the Omnibus series of programmes on BBC One, broadcast between 1971 and 1976, Chappell worked mostly with Andre Previn, memorably pairing Previn with Oscar Peterson to discuss and demonstrate the development of piano jazz. In 1975, Chappell's film in the same series about African Sanctus followed the journey of ethnomusicologist David Fanshawe resulting in the composition and recording of the work, and was nominated for the Prix Italia. An updated version of the film, African Sanctus Revisited, directed by Chappell, was made in 1995.

His work on music documentaries for the BBC continued into the 1980s, leading to commissions by Decca to provide material for video-cassettes and laser-discs. The culmination of this was the high profile Three Tenors concert, filmed from the Baths of Caracalla in Rome during the 1990 World Cup.

Chappell's many television scores include In Loving Memory (1969–1986), Clouds of Witness (1972), The Shadow of the Tower (1972), Murder Must Advertise (1973), and The Pallisers (1974). He wrote "Size Ten Shuffle" for the BBC's dramatisation of Lord Peter Wimsey (1972), which was later featured as the theme for FilmFair's adaptation of Paddington Bear (1976–1980). Chappell also wrote the theme for the BBC television series Songs of Praise (1980–1986).

His song, "The Gonk", appeared in the 1978 film Dawn of the Dead and again, remixed by Kid Koala, in the film Shaun of the Dead (2004). A variation (performed in chicken clucks) is also used as the end theme to Seth Green and Matthew Senreich's animated cartoon Robot Chicken.

== Concert works ==
He also wrote classical pieces, such as the Guitar Concerto, recorded in 1991 by Eduardo Fernandez. Gramophone Magazine described the concerto as "arguably the most dynamic, colourful and explosive guitar concerto of the last half-century". An orchestral Irish Overture dates from 1973.

Chappell died from complications of Alzheimer's disease on 20 October 2019, aged 85.
