= Michael Hurd (composer) =

English composer, teacher and author (1928 - 2006)

Michael John Hurd
- Born: 19 December 1928; Gloucester
- Died: 8 August 2006 (aged 77); Liss
- Education: Pembroke College, Oxford
- Occupations: Composer, conductor, musicologist

Michael John Hurd (19 December 1928 – 8 August 2006) was a composer, teacher and author, principally known for his dramatic cantatas for schools and for his choral music.

== Life ==
Michael Hurd was born in Gloucester on 19 December 1928 and educated at The Crypt School, Gloucester, and Pembroke College, Oxford, where he studied music with Thomas Armstrong and Bernard Rose. He was also a composition pupil of Lennox Berkeley.

After National Service he taught at the Royal Marines Band School at Deal, (1953–59) before settling as a freelance composer in East Hampshire, where he took a leading role in the area's music-making. He bought the terraced, two-bedroom cottage at 4, Church Street, West Liss in 1961 and lived there for the rest of his life.

Like his fellow Petersfield resident, the tenor Wilfred Brown, Hurd championed the memory of Gerald Finzi (co-editing the composer's correspondence with Howard Ferguson), as well as Rutland Boughton (he was music advisor to the Rutland Boughton Music Trust from 1978 to 2006), Ivor Gurney and Cyril Scott. Stephen Banfield, unimpressed by the critical stance of his 1962 biography of Boughton ("Hurd seemed unable to accept the poverty of Boughton's musical imagination - it would perhaps have been difficult to justify the biography had he done so"), was much more positive about The Ordeal of Ivor Gurney, published in 1978 ("not only authoritative and rounded but intensely moving"). From the 1960s Hurd acted as general editor to the Novello Short Biographies series and wrote the volumes on Britten and Tippett. He also wrote three volumes in the Faber Great Composers series.

His lifelong friends included the writer David Hughes and his wife Mai Zetterling. Hughes wrote the libretto for Hurd's first chamber opera, The Widow of Ephesus (1971), and Hurd wrote the music scores for two Zetterling films, Flickorna (1968), and Scrubbers (1982). He was also friends with the British-born Australian composer Michael Easton, with whom he helped establish the Port Fairy Spring Music Festival in Victoria, Australia.

He died on 8 August 2006 in Petersfield.

== Music ==
As a composer, Hurd was prolific. His numerous dramatic works for schoolchildren, especially the "pop cantata" Jonah-Man Jazz (1966), were widely performed during his lifetime and are still heard in schools today. Jonah-Man Jazz followed on in the tradition of Herbert Chappell's The Daniel Jazz (1963), which had previously been issued by Hurd's publisher Novello. Its popular success led Novello to pay Andrew Lloyd Webber a 100-guinea advance to compose a work along the same lines. This resulted in Joseph and the Amazing Technicolor Dreamcoat (1968). Hurd went on to compose a series of further works for schools, deriving much of his income from the cantatas.

However, as Geoffrey Bush pointed out, more serious pieces by Hurd such as the Missa brevis (also 1966) share equally the lyrical invention, sensitivity to words and understanding of the voice seen in his most popular works. There are three chamber operas: The Widow of Ephesus (1971), The Aspern Papers (1994), and The Night of the Wedding (1998). Of those, the three-act Aspern Papers, derived from the novella by Henry James, is the most substantial. It was a success at the Port Fairy Spring Festival in Australia in 1995, and while it hasn't been revived since, it has been recorded.

His orchestral works include the three movement Sinfonia concertante in neo-classical style, first performed in 1973 by the Kathleen Merritt String Orchestra, and the more ambitious four movement choral symphony The Shepherd's Calendar (1975), a setting of John Clare's 1827 poem. The Concerto da Camera of 1979 is a melodic oboe concerto showing the influence of Francis Poulenc. His final work, the Three Piece Suite of 2004, was dedicated to the recorder player John Turner.

Much of his music has now been recorded, supported by a British Music Society Charitable Trust. Notable recordings include the choral music and complete solo songs on Lyrita (two volumes), three of the chamber operas on Lyrita and Dutton Epoch, the pop cantatas on Naxos, and The Shepherd's Calendar on Dutton Epoch.

== Selected compositions ==
Dramatic works for children

- Little Billy (1964) (children's opera)
- Jonah-Man Jazz (1966) (pop cantata)
- Mr Punch (1970) (operatic entertainment for young people)
- Swingin' Samson (1973) (pop cantata)
- Hip Hip Horatio (1975) (oratorio)
- Rooster Rag (1975) (pop cantata)
- Pilgrim (1978) (musical morality)
- Adam in Eden (1981) (pop cantata)
- A New Nowell (1986) (cantata)
- Captain Coram's Kids (1987) (pop cantata)
- The Liberty Tree (1989) (ballad cantata)
- Prodigal (1998, revised 1991) (pop cantata)
- King and Conscience (1990) (ballad cantata)
- Mr Owen's Great Endeavour (1991) (ballad cantata)
- Pop Pied Piper (1998) (pop cantata)

Chamber operas

- The Widow of Ephesus (1971)
- The Aspern Papers (1995)
- The Night of the Wedding (1998)

Film scores

- Flickorna (directed by Mai Zetterling, 1968)
- Scrubbers (directed by Mai Zetterling, 1982)

Choral

- Missa brevis (1966)
- A Song for St Cecilia (1966)
- Music's Praise (1968)
- Charms and Ceremonies (1969)
- Flower Songs (1973)
- Genesis (1987) (setting Geoffrey Hill)
- A Choral Cantata (1991)
- Night Songs of Edward Thomas (1994)
- Five Spiritual Songs (1996)

Orchestral and instrumental ensemble

- Shore Leave (1962) (orchestral songs, setting Charles Causley)
- Sinfonia Concertante (1968, revised 1973)
- Harlequin Suite (1971, revised 1983) (for brass quintet)
- Dance Diversions (1972)
- Overture to an Unwritten Comedy (1975)
- Shepherd's Calendar (1975) (choral symphony, setting John Clare)
- Concerto da Camera (1979) (oboe and string orchestra)

Chamber

- Flute Sonatina (1964)
- Le Tombeau de Prudence (1974) (flute, oboe and piano)
- Violin Sonata (1989)
- Recorder Sonatina (2003)
- Three Piece Suite (2004) (recorder and piano)

== Selected publications ==
- Immortal Hour: the Life and Period of Rutland Boughton (1962), rev. 1993 as Rutland Boughton and the Glastonbury Festivals ISBN 0091897637
- Young Person's Guide to Concerts (1962)
- Young Person's Guide to Opera (1963)
- Young Person's Guide to English Music (1965)
- Benjamin Britten (Novello Short Biographies, 1966)
- The Composer (1968)
- An Outline History of European Music (Novello, 1968, revised 1988) ISBN 0853600767
- Elgar (Faber Great Composers, 1969)
- Vaughan Williams (Faber Great Composers, 1970)
- Mendelssohn (Faber Great Composers, 1970)
- The Ordeal of Ivor Gurney (OUP, 1978) ISBN 0192117521
- Michael Tippett (Novello Short Biographies, 1978)
- New Oxford Junior Companion to Music (1979) ISBN 1851521097
- Vincent Novello and Company (Granada, 1981) ISBN 0246117338
- The Orchestra (Phaidon, 1981) ISBN 0871964694
- (with Howard Ferguson). Letters of Gerald Finzi and Howard Ferguson (ed.) (2001)
