= Charlotte Mitchell =

English actress and poet (1926–2012)

- Tony Maiden as Albert Clifton (left), Charlotte Mitchell as Amy Winthrop (middle) and Roderick Shaw as Kevin Gordon (right) in the episode "The Ponies" of the first series of The Adventures of Black Beauty.
- Born: Edna Winifred Mitchell; 23 July 1926; Ipswich, Suffolk, England
- Died: 2 May 2012 (aged 85); Chiswick, London, England
- Years active: 1949–1996
- Known for: The Adventures of Black Beauty
- Partner: Philip Guard (1952–1968)
- Children: Dominic Guard; Christopher Guard; Candy Guard
- Relatives: Pippa Guard (niece)

Charlotte Mitchell (born Edna Winifred Mitchell; 23 July 1926 – 2 May 2012) was an English actress and poet.

== Biography ==
In the 1950s she provided lyrics, sketches, and occasionally acted in revues on London's West End. She was especially successful in her ventures providing lyrics for Madeleine Dring in Airs on a Shoestring (1953), Pay the Piper (1954), and Fresh Airs (1956), all productions of Laurier Lister.

She was once (allegedly) the girlfriend of Peter Sellers, and appeared in The Goon Show episodes Ye Bandit of Sherwood Forest (1954) as Maid Marian and Tales of Montmartre (1956) as Seagoon's love interest, Fifi. Charlotte Mitchell was married to the actor Philip Guard, from whom she separated in 1968, and was the mother of three children: actors Christopher Guard and Dominic Guard and animator and novelist Candy Guard. Charlotte lived in West London during the later part of her life and continued to be active as a poet.

She appeared on BBC Radio with Ian Carmichael in The Small, Intricate Life of Gerald C. Potter. Carmichael played Gerald C. Potter, mystery writer, while she played Diana, his wife, who, under the pseudonym of Miss Magnolia Badminton, wrote romantic novels. She also played, on radio, the Dowager Duchess (Lord Peter Wimsey's mother) in the radio adaption of Strong Poison that starred Ian Carmichael as Wimsey, and the character of Kath Miller in the BBC Radio 2 daily serial Waggoners' Walk. On television, she played Amy Winthrop the housekeeper in The Adventures of Black Beauty (1972–74), and Monica Spencer in And Mother Makes Five.

Her poetry was published in collections such as Twelve Burnt Saucepans, Looking Round Dangerously, I Want to Go Home and Just in Case. These provided the basis of a series of popular programmes on BBC Radio 4 in which she read her own work. Her poetry is often requested and read on BBC Radio 4's Poetry Please, and one of her poems was chosen by Judi Dench and Michael Williams in their joint BBC Radio 4 programme With Great Pleasure.

== Death ==
Mitchell died in Chiswick, London, on 2 May 2012, aged 85, from pneumonia. She had previously battled breast cancer and myeloma.

== Filmography ==
=== Films ===
- The Romantic Age (1949, Naughty Arlette 1950 in the US) – Charlotte (uncredited)
- The Happiest Days of Your Life (1950) – Ethel (uncredited)
- Laughter in Paradise (1951) – Ethel
- The Man in the White Suit (1951) – Mill Girl
- Lady Godiva Rides Again (1951) – Lucille
- Curtain Up (1952) – Daphne Ray
- Time Bomb (1953) – Buffet Waitress (uncredited)
- The Story of Gilbert and Sullivan (1953) (or The Great Gilbert and Sullivan in the US) – Charlotte
- Street Corner (1953, Both Sides of the Law 1954 in the US) – Lily Propert (uncredited)
- Lost (1955, Tears for Simon 1957 in the US) – Farmer's Wife (uncredited)
- The Bridal Path (1959) – Mrs. Mavis Bruce (uncredited)
- Village of the Damned (1960) – Janet Pawle
- Dentist in the Chair (1960) – Woman in Surgery
- Nearly a Nasty Accident (1961) – Miss Chamberlain
- Dentist on the Job (1961, Get on with It! 1963 in the US) – Mrs. Burke
- The Blood on Satan's Claw (1970) – Ellen
- Jim, the World's Greatest (1975) – School Secretary
- The French Lieutenant's Woman (1981) – Mrs. Tranter
- Out of the Darkness (1985) – Mrs. Barrow
- The First Kangaroos (1988) – Mrs. Oaks

=== Television ===
- Not in Front of the Children (1967–1970) – Mary
- Dombey and Son (1969) - Polly "Richards" Toodle
- Persuasion (1971) – Mrs. Clay
- The Adventures of Black Beauty (1972–1974) – Amy Winthrop
- The Kids from 47A (1973, Writer)
- ...And Mother Makes Five (1974–1976) – Monica Spencer
- In This House of Brede (1975, TV Movie) – Mrs. Fraser
- Miss Jones and Son (1977) – Mum
- Shades of Darkness (1983) – Mrs. Blinder
- Return to Treasure Island (1986) – Mrs. Hawkins
- The Woman He Loved (1988, TV Movie) – Lady Chatfield
- Selling Hitler (1991) – Lady Katherine Giles
- Pond Life (1996) – Ivy
- Heartbeat (1997–1999) – Granny Bellamy (final appearance)
