= An Unsuitable Job for a Woman =

An Unsuitable Job for a Woman may refer to:

- An Unsuitable Job for a Woman (novel), a 1972 detective novel by P. D. James
- An Unsuitable Job for a Woman (film), a 1982 British psychological thriller film, based on the novel
- An Unsuitable Job for a Woman (TV series), a 1997 British television mystery drama series, based on the novel
