= An Unsuitable Job for a Woman (novel) =

1972 Cordelia Gray novel by P. D. James

- First edition
- Author: P. D. James
- Language: English
- Series: Cordelia Gray No. 1
- Genre: Mystery
- Publisher: Faber & Faber
- Publication date: 1972
- Publication place: United Kingdom
- Media type: Print (hardcover, paperback)
- Pages: 287
- ISBN: 0-446-31517-6 (paperback edition)
- OCLC: 31623136
- Followed by: The Skull Beneath the Skin

An Unsuitable Job for a Woman is the title of a detective novel by English writer P. D. James and of a TV series of four dramas developed from that novel. It was published in 1972 by Faber and Faber in the UK and by Charles Scribner's Sons in the US.

The book features private detective Cordelia Gray, the protagonist of both this title and The Skull Beneath the Skin (1982). It is noted for introducing a new type of female detective at the start of the feminist era.

== Plot summary ==
22-year-old private detective Cordelia Gray walks into the London office she shares with former police detective Bernie Pryde to find her partner has committed suicide. Pryde has left everything, including his unlicensed handgun, to Cordelia, who decides to keep the failing agency open out of gratitude. When she returns to her office from the funeral service, she is visited by her first client, Elizabeth Leaming, assistant to prominent scientist Sir Ronald Callender, whose son Mark recently hanged himself.

Cordelia travels to Cambridge, where Mark had left university and taken a job as gardener, despite decent grades and the prospect of a considerable inheritance from his maternal grandfather. Her task is to discover the reason for Mark's death; but she begins to suspect foul play. She meets Mark's student friends, who are reluctant to talk and attempt to convince Cordelia that his death really was suicidal.

Cordelia decides to move into the rundown cottage on the estate where Mark had worked. As she sifts through Mark's effects, trying to get a clearer picture of his life, she becomes ever more convinced that his death could not have been suicide. Employing friendly overtures, Mark's former companions repeatedly try to lead her away from the investigation; but Cordelia is determined to succeed in her first solo case. Upon returning to the cottage one night, she finds an effigy hanging from the same hook upon which Mark's body had been suspended; this convinces her that someone is trying to scare her off.

She finds out that a certain Nanny Pilbeam, formerly nanny to Mark's mother, had attended Mark's cremation, and goes to question her. The old woman tells Cordelia that she went to see Mark at his college and gave him a Book of Common Prayer that his mother had wanted him to have when he turned 21. Cordelia finds the book in the cottage, and discovers in it evidence that Lady Callender could not have been Mark's mother.

Back at the cottage the following night, someone attacks Cordelia, throws her down a well and replaces the cover. She is saved by a combination of her own resourcefulness and the good luck that the cottage owner notices the well has been tampered with. Cordelia in turn lies in wait with Bernie's gun in order to ambush her would-be killer. He turns out to be Sir Ronald's laboratory assistant, Lunn, who had been tailing her during her investigations. He escapes in his van, but then dies in a collision with a truck. Cordelia, now certain of her case, continues to Sir Ronald's house, where Miss Leaming takes her gun from her and leads her to Sir Ronald. Cordelia privately accuses him of the murder of his son, which he defiantly admits, sure that nothing can be proved against him. Miss Leaming, however, who has overheard him, enters the office and shoots him with Cordelia's gun.

Miss Leaming confesses to Cordelia that she was Mark's true mother, but Sir Ronald prevented her from telling him this. Lady Callender had been infertile and died shortly after Mark's birth. Sir Ronald had murdered Mark when he was close to discovering the truth, so as not to lose his wife's fortune. Cordelia sympathises with Miss Leaming and is determined to protect Mark's legacy, so the two rearrange the crime scene to look like yet another suicide and it is accepted as such by the coroner. The case, however, is referred to Chief Superintendent Adam Dalgliesh, who had been Bernie Pryde's commander originally and then sacked him. Word arrives during their interview that Leaming has been killed in a car crash, allowing Cordelia to maintain the fiction they concocted together. Dalgliesh admits to Cordelia, based on his observation of her abilities, that perhaps he had underrated Pryde. He also believes that he has worked out the true facts of the case, but in private conference with his superiors says there is little point in disturbing the official story in view of the social and international pressures on the police.

Cordelia returns resignedly to the agency and finds her next client waiting, a man who believes his 'lady friend' might be cheating on him.

== Literary significance and criticism ==
The New York Times judged the book "A top-rated puzzle of peril that holds you all the way", whose characters "are anything but stereotypes", although "at the very end, things are a little too pat". Jacques Barzun, in a later supplement to his A Catalogue of Crime, however, thought it "barely passable". The novel also received a nomination for an American Edgar Award, and many requests for another novel featuring Cordelia Gray.

Authors commenting on the introduction of the new type of female detective noted the novel as a key pioneering work in which the focus is "at least as much on character and theme as…on crime". Another critic described it as "a political contribution to the recasting of the female detective mould", noting in particular how its heroine avenges a young man's murder by his father and connives in the murder in return of the father by the boy's mother in an act of feminine solidarity.

However, some critics also note that despite the novel's feminist undertones, Cordelia remains under male authority during the novel. SueEllen Campbell comments that "throughout the novel...Dalgliesh is present as a sort of transcendental authority," a point echoed by Kate Watson in the European Journal of English Studies that "always in the margins is the shadowy figure of Inspector Adam Dalgleish… the patriarchal figure that embodies the conventions of the traditional family of crime fiction."

=== The Role of An Unsuitable Job for a Woman in Detective Fiction ===
Cordelia Gray is one of the few female private investigators in detective fiction. This is frequently acknowledged in the novel, as other characters repeatedly question whether Cordelia's occupation is "suitable" for her. This question inspires the book's title, acknowledging Cordelia's novelty within the genre.

According to Dennis Porter, the novel also stands out from other detective fiction because of its commentary on ethics. In contrast to the detectives that predate the novel, Cordelia continually questions the morals of the people she encounters, and is also motivated by achieving justice for Mark. Based on her successful detection as an independent, "morally upright" woman, Cordelia was frequently viewed as a "hero" around the time of the novel's release.

Cordelia also has a distinct closeness to the victim. During her investigation, she lives in Mark's cottage and wears some of his clothes, even using his belt to pull herself out of the well and save her own life. In addition, Cordelia relates to Mark on account of their shared experiences. Both Cordelia and Mark's mothers died shortly after they were born. Mark attended Cambridge University, which Cordelia sought to attend herself. Finally, they both have fathers more dedicated to working for the greater-good than caring for their children. Joan G. Kotker claims that this explains Cordelia's motivation to attain justice for Mark, as she is also "avenging herself."

== Film, TV or theatrical adaptations ==
The book has been twice adapted. The first adaptation, directed by Chris Petit, was released in UK cinemas in 1982, featuring Pippa Guard as Cordelia. It was financed and produced by Goldcrest Films/ The National Film Finance Corporation and Don Boyd.

A television series starring Helen Baxendale as Cordelia and Annette Crosbie as Edith Sparshott was made in 1997 and 2001, based in part upon the book.
