= Female detectives in the United Kingdom =

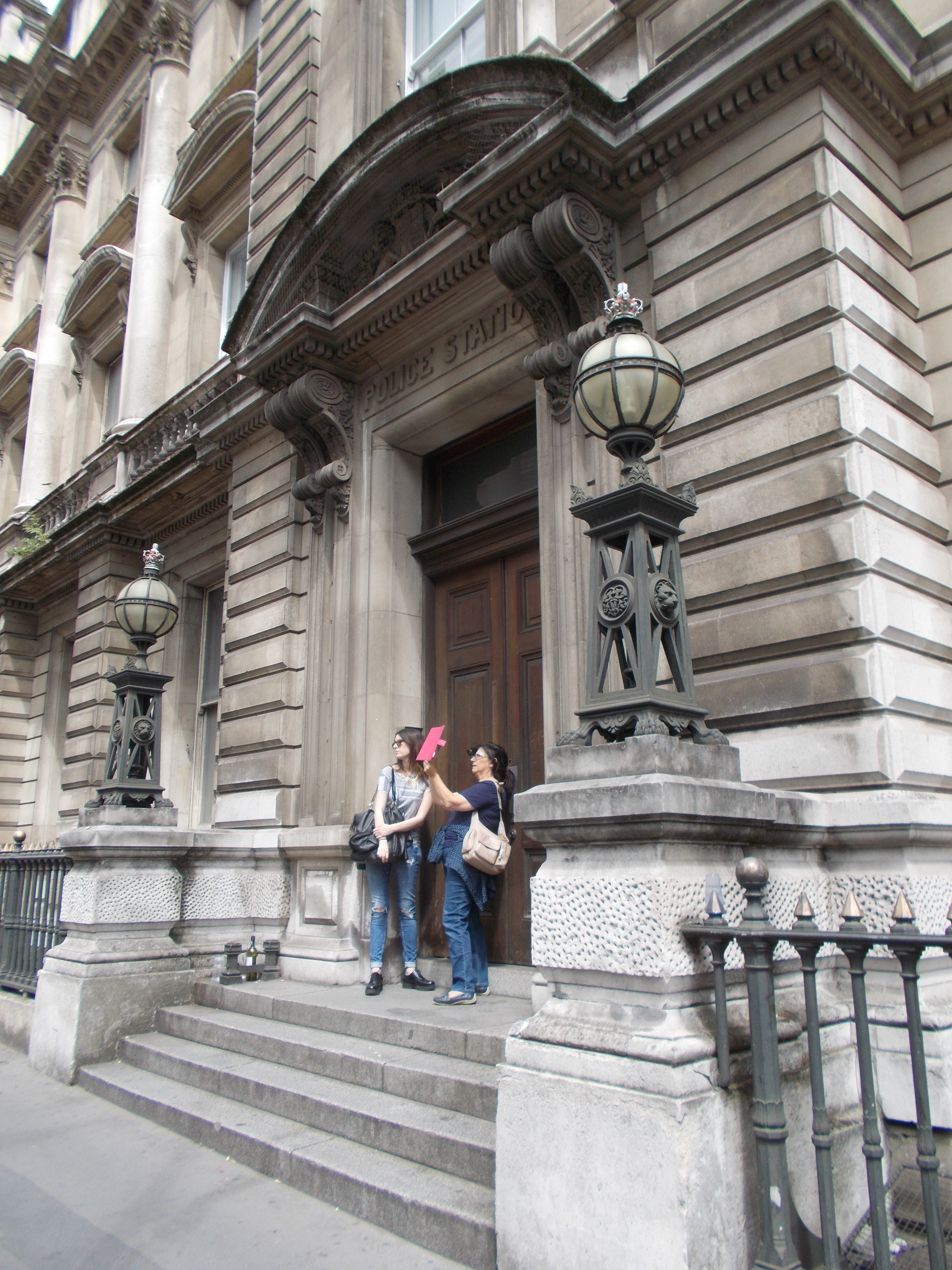
The former Bow Street police station, London

The first records of a detective organization in London began in 1767, with the Bow Street Runners. This consisted of a group of seven men who investigated a robbery gone wrong. They got their name from the Bow Street magistrate’s office, the place where the men all worked. They had been trained to do this kind of work by their boss, John Fielding.

Other organizations followed the Bow Street Runners. There were small forces all across Europe that maintained order as best they could until a unified police force was created.

Some of those police forces were:

- Abingdon Borough Police
- Banbury Borough Police
- City of Glasgow Police
- Dublin Metropolitan Police

== History of female detectives ==
Women have been doing detective work for centuries, even though there has been little-to-no documentation on them. Accounts from the mid 1800s reveal the work of female detectives.

Women did detective work on their own, mostly without recognition. They covered a wide range of cases, from robberies to murder.

These female detectives were the beginning of women’s acceptance into the police force. However, it wasn’t for another 150 years that women were employed by law enforcement agencies. In Britain, police forces did not allow women to become officers until after World War 1.

=== Maud West ===
Maud West was a female detective who owned her own business in the 1920s. She is often regarded as the first British female detective and is known mostly for her undercover jobs. She dealt mostly with adultery cases, but there were also accounts of her work spying on suffragettes in London. There has been speculation that Maud’s accounts of her cases were largely exaggerated.

== Female detectives in literature ==
The detective stories popular in today's society owe their origins to excerpts written by actual detectives at the beginning of the profession. These stories are what prompted the mystery genre.

In fiction, female detectives have been around nearly as long as male detectives have. As detective novels grew in popularity, there became an increase in authors writing about women, and woman detectives especially. Among these authors was Andrew Forrester, who wrote about the mysterious "Miss G." Miss G. is often viewed as the first fictional female detective, although some would argue that the first female detective was Mrs. Paschal written by Stephens W. Hayward. His novel Revelations of a Lady Detective was released almost instantaneously as Forrester's. The two men are credited as being the first authors of detective novels which had female narrators. Ruth Trail was the very first woman in literature to be shown doing detective work. "Ruth the Betrayer" was written by Edward Ellis and published over the course of the year 1862. Its last installment was in 1863. Ruth was a spy for the London police and lived a double life.

Published the year after "Ruth the Betrayer" was Andrew Forrester’s The Female Detective. Forrester's Miss G., as she is often referred to, is a mysterious narrator. The audience knows almost nothing about her and are left to discover her character on their own. The book focuses on several of Miss G.'s cases.

Mrs. Paschal, conceived at the same time as Miss G., is another prominent female detective. She was written to be intuitive and perceptive. Her character is quite the opposite of Miss G’s.

With the exception of these novels, there were hardly any books written with female narrators. It wasn’t until the mid-late 1900s that heroine novels really picked up steam. In the 1900s, the desire for more female detectives/heroines grew, and many more books were published for the public. Some prominent female detective characters in literature/on screen:

- Irene Adler
- Lady Lara Croft
- Nancy Drew
- Olivia Dunham
- Jessica Fletcher
- Cordelia Gray
- Enola Holmes
- Shirley Holmes
- Jessica Jones
- Veronica Mars
- Juliet O'Hara
- Robin Ellacott from the Cormoran Strike series

=== Female authors of detective fiction ===
Agatha Christie is one of the most prominent authors of the 1900s. Her mystery novels are still read and referenced today and inspired many other mystery books. Though it wasn’t unusual for women to write in Christie’s time, it wasn’t common for them to be published. Christie’s contribution to the mystery genre was immense.

There were other female authors who wrote novels. Unfortunately, many of these women were lost to time. There is one story, written by a woman from the Victorian ages, which centers around a “Detective Maidservant.” In it, the maidservant conducts an investigation, not too different from the ones that are written about today, and eventually solves the problem. This was highly unusual for the time period it was written in.

== Other roles performed by women ==
=== Women as spies ===
There are many accounts of women doing spy work in the 19th and 20th centuries. One such account is of a woman named Ursula Kuczynski (Ursula Hamburger). She was also known by her undercover name: Agent Sonya. Ursula lived in the mid 1900s and was a triple agent, spying on both the Allies and the Axel in World War II, for communist Russia. Other Female wartime spies:

- Denise Bloch
- Rachel Dübendorfer
- Jeannette Guyot
- Odette Hallowes
- Elizaveta Mukasei
- Eileen Nearne
- Jacqueline Nearne
- Edith Tudor-Hart

=== Women in war ===
Along with performing the work of spies, women held many other vital positions during wartime: Women's roles in the World Wars.

== See also ==
- Women in the World Wars
- List of female detective characters
