= Fresh Airs =

Fresh Airs was a revue produced by Laurier Lister that opened in Brighton in 1955. It was the last in his series of "Airs" revues before Flanders & Swann started performing for themselves in At the Drop of a Hat.

== Cast ==
- Max Adrian
- Moyra Fraser
- Rose Hill
- Bernard Hunter
- Pat Lancaster
- Julian Orchard

== Songs ==
All the songs mentioned here were written by Flanders & Swann unless stated otherwise.

- Overture: More Strings to Our Bow Opening number. Tries to forestall any unfavourable comparisons with the previous revue, Airs on a Shoestring.
- The Lord Chamberlain's Regulations Part of the collection 'Programme Notes'. Three settings to the Lord Chamberlain's requirements, later used by F & S as encores for their 'Hat' shows.
- Miss Fraser's Dresses Part of the collection 'Programme Notes'. Credits detailing Moyra Fraser's wardrobe.
- Bi-Party Line Refers to the lack of choice between the Labour and Conservative parties.
- Rain on the Plage Written to go with a very expensive backdrop depicting the South of France. Later recorded for 'And Then We Wrote...'.
- Interim Report A re-worked version of 'The Wom Pom' to reference nuclear power.
- Capital Charge
- The Album A 'charm' number. The music and words were written by Michael Flanders and was sung by Pat Lancaster.
- Rockall A topical song referring to Britain's claim to the uninhabited isle of Rockall in 1955.

Bottom Five Five numbers allegedly from the bottom five of the Hit Parade, mocking the popular songs of the day. Two of the songs, 'You' and 'The 100 Song' made it into 'At the Drop of a Hat', though the former was censored and the latter cut from the recordings due to space on the discs, though it was later released in the 'Exitary' section of the 'Bestiary of Flanders and Swann'. 'Jaguar' was re-written in animal version and released on the 'Bestiary'.

- You (Satellite Moon) Sung by Bernard Hunter
- Anyone Will Do Sung by Moyra Fraser
- Death Wish Sung by Max Adrian. J. R. R. Tolkien's favourite Flanders and Swann song.
- Jaguar (car version) Originally about the model of car. Sung by Julian Orchard and Patricia Lancaster.
- The 100 Song Sung by Rose Hill.
