= Dominic Guard =

British actor, writer and psychologist

- Born: 18 June 1956 (age 70); London, England
- Occupations: Actor, author, child psychotherapist
- Years active: 1969–2000
- Parent(s): Philip Guard; Charlotte Mitchell
- Relatives: Christopher Guard (brother); Pippa Guard (cousin)

Dominic Guard (born 18 June 1956) is an English child psychotherapist, author and former actor.

== Early life ==
Guard was born in London on 18 June 1956. His father, Philip Guard, was an English stage actor, his mother, Charlotte Mitchell, an actress and poet. His older brother Christopher, also an actor, was born in 1953. His sister is the animator Candy Guard. His parents separated when he was twelve.

As a 14-year-old, in The Go-Between (1971), Guard played Leo Colston, the title character who runs messages between two secret lovers and has a momentous 13th birthday. For his performance he won a BAFTA Award in 1971 as Most Promising Newcomer to Leading Film Roles. The film won the Palme d'Or, the main prize at the Cannes film festival.

== Career ==
Guard later appeared as Huw Morgan in How Green Was My Valley (1975 TV series), Picnic at Hanging Rock (1975), The Count of Monte Cristo (1975) with Richard Chamberlain, Absolution (1978) alongside Richard Burton and Billy Connolly, Gandhi (1982), and in P. D. James's An Unsuitable Job for a Woman alongside his cousin Pippa Guard.

In 1978 Guard voiced the role of Pippin in an animated adaptation of The Lord of the Rings. His brother Christopher Guard starred alongside him in the film, voicing Frodo Baggins. On stage he played Christopher in a 1982 production of The Jeweller's Shop by Karol Wojtyła, later Pope John Paul II, at the Westminster Theatre, and appeared in a guest role in the 1983 Doctor Who story Terminus. He continued acting regularly until 2000.

== Later career ==
Guard is now a fully accredited child psychotherapist living in London and has written more than ten books for children, including Little Box of Mermaid Treasures, Pirate Fun, The Dragon Master's Tale, and Secrets of the Fairy Ring.

== Personal life ==
Guard is the father of two children with the actress Sharon Duce, with whom he appeared in Absolution (1978).

== Work ==
=== Films ===
- The Go-Between (1971) - Leo Colston
- The Nelson Affair (1973) - George Matcham Jr.
- Picnic at Hanging Rock (1975) - Michael Fitzhubert
- The Count of Monte Cristo (1975) - Albert Mondego
- The Lord of the Rings (1978) - Pippin Took
- Absolution (1978) - Benjamin Stanfield
- One Fine Day (1979) - Rycroft
- An Unsuitable Job for a Woman (1982) - Andrew Lunn
- Gandhi (1982) - Subaltern
- L' Homme qui a perdu son ombre (The Man who Lost his Shadow) (1991) - Paul

=== Television ===
- The Hands of Cormac Joyce (Hallmark Hall of Fame) (1972) - Jackie Joyce
- How Green Was My Valley (1976) - Huw Morgan
- Maybury (1981) - Colin Gilbert
- Crown Court (1982) - John Harper
- Cousin Phillis (1982) - Paul Manning
- Terminus (Doctor Who) (1983) - Olvir
- The Hello Goodbye Man (1984) - Glen Harris
- A Woman of Substance (1985) - Winston Harte
- Big Deal (series 3) 'Playing the ace' & 'The biggest deal' (1986) - Simon
- All Creatures Great and Small S7.Ep4 'A Friend for Life' (1990) - Peter Shadwell
- The Bill - S7.Ep79 'Friday and Counting' (1991) - Robin Granger
- Casualty - S6.E15 'Cascade' (1992) - Tim Turner
- The Gingerbread Girl (1993) - David
- The Bill - S10.Ep71 'Lesson to be Learned' (1994) - Vernon Meredith
- Casualty - S10.E11 'Release' (1995) - Philip Hall
- Wycliffe - S2.Ep6 Happy Families (1995) - Mick Brandon
- The Bill - S12.Ep147 'Black Money' (1996) - Tony Baker
- Annie's Bar (1996) - Alistair Read
- Poirot - S7.Ep2 Lord Edgware Dies (2000) - Bryan Martin

== Bibliography ==
- Holmstrom, John. The Moving Picture Boy: An International Encyclopaedia from 1895 to 1995. Norwich, Michael Russell, 1996, pp. 314–315.
