= Cordelia Gray =

- Cordelia Gray, as she appeared in volume 14 of Detective Conan
- First appearance: An Unsuitable Job for a Woman (1972)
- Last appearance: The Skull Beneath the Skin (1982)
- Created by: P. D. James
- Portrayed by: Pippa Guard; Judi Bowker; Greta Scacchi; Helen Baxendale

In-universe information
- Nickname: Delia (by her father)
- Gender: Female
- Occupation: Private detective
- Family: Redvers Gray (father, deceased)
- Significant other: Georges (ex-boyfriend); Carl (ex-boyfriend)
- Nationality: British

Cordelia Gray is a fictional character created by English author P. D. James. Gray is the protagonist of two novels, An Unsuitable Job for a Woman (1972) and of The Skull Beneath the Skin (1982). Cordelia Gray is a young woman who works as a private detective in London, having inherited the detective agency "Pryde" on the death of her boss, Bernie Pryde, who committed suicide.

== Fictional character biography ==
Cordelia lost her mother an hour after birth. Her father Redvers, a Marxist traveling poet and revolutionary, did not really care about his daughter, so Cordelia had many adoptive parents, and from six to eight years old she lived in a cottage in Remford with Mrs. Gibson and her children. At eleven, she was confused with another C. Gray and won a scholarship to the Convent of Infant Jesus, where she stayed for six years. Then Redvers took her away from the convent, and they started traveling in Germany and Italy with Mr. Gray's revolutionary friends. During their wandering, Cordelia worked as their maid, cook, bellhop and nurse.

Six months later, Mr. Gray died of a heart disease in Rome. After his death, Cordelia returned to England and became the secretary of the private detective Bernie G. Pryde, and later his partner in investigations. Two months later, Pryde was diagnosed with cancer and committed suicide. Instead of selling the detective agency off, Cordelia decided to keep it open, helped by the young aspiring actor Bevis and the old secretary Mrs. Maudsley. Despite dealing with cases involving murders and threats, the agency becomes specialized in searching for missing animals.

At the conclusion of An Unsuitable Job for a Woman, Cordelia Gray meets James's other detective Adam Dalgliesh. In A Taste for Death it is mentioned that they have been seen dining together. Cordelia is also referred to at the beginning and at the end of another Dalgliesh novel, The Black Tower:

Daniel asked [about Dalgliesh]:
"Is he conscious?"
"Barely. Your chap in there says he's been quoting King Lear. Something about Cordelia anyway ..."

== Personality ==
Cordelia lives near Thames Street in an apartment with furniture bought from second-hand dealers or during auctions in the suburbs.

At first shy and unconfident, as the story progresses she learns how to solve a case and becomes methodical and serious. A stoic girl, she deals with the suicide of Bernie calmly. Whilst she seems to like order and knowledge, and seems as though she remains focused to the task, during many occasions within The Skull Beneath the Skin she becomes somewhat superficial and conscious of her appearance, compared to that of the more privileged of her clients. Cordelia loves travelling and reading, and is jealous of her privacy. She is a decent shooter. Despite being educated in a Catholic convent, she is not a strong believer.

== Adaptations ==
=== Television ===
Cordelia Gray was first portrayed by Pippa Guard in the 1982 television adaptation of An Unsuitable Job for a Woman directed by Chris Petit.

In four separate feature-length dramas comprise the ITV's HTV series (also called An Unsuitable Job for a Woman), Cordelia Gray was portrayed by Helen Baxendale.

- Sacrifice was first broadcast from 24 October to 7 November 1997, consisting of three separate 60-minute episodes.
- A Last Embrace was first broadcast from 19 February to 5 March 1998, also consisting of three separate 60-minute episodes.
- Living on Risk was first broadcast on 27 August 1999, as one 120-minute episode.
- Playing God was first broadcast on 16 May 2001, as one 120-minute episode.

=== BBC Radio ===
The books have both been adapted for BBC Radio 4. An Unsuitable Job for a Woman starred Judi Bowker as Cordelia, while The Skull Beneath the Skin featured Greta Scacchi in the role.

== Other appearances ==
Gray was highlighted in volume 14 of the Detective Conan manga's edition of "Gosho Aoyama's Mystery Library", a section of the graphic novels where the author introduces a different detective (or occasionally, a villain) from mystery literature, television, or other media. Her name was also used to create a cover name for one of the series' main characters, Ai Haibara: as stated by professor Hiroshi Agasa in volume 18, the "Hai" (灰) kanji meaning "gray" in her surname is a tribute to Cordelia.
