= Philip Guard =

English actor (1928–2024)

Philip John Guard (29 November 1928 – May 2024) was an English stage actor who occasionally appeared in film and television.

== Life and career ==
Philip John Guard was born in Rochford, Essex, on 29 November 1928.

Guard appeared occasionally in film and television, though was more prolific on stage.

In 1956, he married the actress Charlotte Mitchell; they separated in 1968. Their sons are the actors Christopher Guard and Dominic Guard, and daughter Candy Guard, a writer and animator.

Guard appeared, unwittingly, alongside Mark Dignam and John Bryning, on the fade-out of The Beatles' song "I Am the Walrus," on which a 1967 BBC radio broadcast of King Lear can be heard with Guard playing "Edgar."

Guard died in May 2024, at the age of 95.
