= Theatrical constraints =

Rules governing theatre productions

Theatrical constraints are various rules, either of taste or of law, that govern the production, staging, and content of stage plays in the theater. Whether imposed externally, by virtue of monopoly franchises or censorship laws, or whether imposed voluntarily by actors, directors, or producers, these restraints have taxed the creative minds of the theatre to tackle the challenges of working with and around them.

The Classical unities, requiring "unity" of "time, place, and subject", is the most well-known of all theatrical constraints. It was first employed in Italy in 1514 and later became embraced in France. Another example is the Japanese prohibition of female acting in 1625, then the prohibition of young male actors in 1657, that creates "Onnagata" which is the ground of Japanese theatrical tradition. In the Elizabethan theatre of Shakespeare, a similar ban forbade all actresses from appearing on stage, at all; The parts of women were generally played by boys. The plot of Shakespeare in Love turns on this fact.

In cinema, the Dogme 95 films form a body of work produced under voluntary constraints that severely limit both the choice of subjects and the choice of techniques used to bring them to the screen.

Another culturally significant constraint occurred in France. In the late seventeenth century (1697 to be exact), Italian companies were prohibited from appearing in France, so native actors took over the Italian plays and made the roles their own with great success.

In the markets and fairgrounds, itinerant actors created a new theatrical form by holding up cue-cards (like sub-titles or karaoke) containing the words of the plays or songs, which the audience then acted or sang for them. This became even more successful, with crowds coming from all around to see how the actors had overcome such rigid censorship.

Some of the restrictions, or traditions born of them, may have still been in place in the nineteenth century, at least if Marcel Carné's Les Enfants du Paradis is a reliable guide.

== See also ==
- Theatrical superstitions
- British theatrical censorship
  - Lord Chamberlain's Office
  - Lord Chamberlain's requirements
