= Radio On =

1979 film by Chris Petit

- Directed by: Christopher Petit
- Written by: Christoper Petit
- Produced by: Keith Griffiths
- Starring: David Beames; Sandy Ratcliff; Lisa Kreuzer
- Cinematography: Martin Schäfer
- Edited by: Anthony Sloman
- Production companies: British Film Institute; Road Movies Filmproducktion GmbH
- Distributed by: British Film Institute
- Release dates: 23 August 1979 (United Kingdom); 4 July 1980 (West Germany)
- Running time: 104 minutes
- Countries: United Kingdom; West Germany
- Language: English

Radio On is a 1979 British road mystery drama film directed by Christopher Petit. It is a rare example of a British road movie, shot in black and white by Wim Wenders' assistant cameraman Martin Schäfer and featuring music from a number of new wave bands of the time, as well as established artists such as Kraftwerk, Devo and David Bowie.

== Plot ==
The film is a journey through late 1970s Britain by way of a road trip from London to Bristol, with Robert, a DJ attempting to investigate the suicide of his brother.

== Cast ==
- David Beames as Robert
- Lisa Kreuzer as Ingrid
- Sandy Ratcliff as Kathy
- Andrew Byatt as Deserter
- Sue Jones-Davies as Girl
- Sting as Just Like Eddie
- Sabina Michael as Aunt
- Katja Kersten as German Woman
- Paul Hollywood as Kid
- Adrian Jones
- Cyril Kent
- Bernard Mistovski
- Nina Pace
- Joseph Riordan
- David Squire
- Kim Taylforth as Girl Playing Pool

== Trivia ==
- The radio station where Robert is a disc jockey was based on the United Biscuits Network, which broadcast to factories owned by United Biscuits.
- There are a number of references to the films of Wim Wenders, who is credited as associate producer. Early in the film, a copy of Patricia Highsmith's Ripley's Game is seen on a table in Robert's flat. Wenders' 1977 film The American Friend is based on this novel. The character played by Sting is called Just Like Eddie. In Wenders' film Kings of the Road, two of the characters sing along to the song Just Like Eddie by Heinz. And Lisa Kreuzer, who plays Ingrid, is looking for her daughter Alice. Kreuzer was married to Wenders for several years, and was in several of his films, notably Alice in the Cities.

== Legacy ==
- In his 2022 book Roadrunner Nick Gilbert revisits the film, the route and its resonances 43 years later and includes contributions from Petit and others involved in the film.
