= Nell Rankin =

American opera singer (1924–2005)

An autographed photo of Nell Rankin.

Nell Rankin (January 3, 1924 – January 13, 2005) was an American operatic mezzo-soprano. Though a successful opera singer internationally, she spent most of her career at the Metropolitan Opera, where she worked from 1951 to 1976. She was particularly admired for her portrayals of Amneris in Verdi's Aida and the title role in Bizet's Carmen. Opera News said, "Her full, generous tone and bold phrasing, especially in the Italian repertory, were unique among American mezzos of her generation.

== Early life and education ==
Born in Montgomery, Alabama, Rankin was raised in a musical family. Along with her parents and siblings, Rankin grew up playing various musical instruments. She began performing at the age of four on the radio by singing for commercials. As a teenager she studied voice with Madame Jeanne Lorraine (a ten-year student of vocal pedagogue, Manuel Garcia), at the Birmingham Conservatory. In order to pay for her lessons with Lorraine, Rankin rented the Huntingdon College pool and spent her summers teaching the children of Montgomery to swim. Helen Traubel visited the conservatory to perform a recital in 1943. Determined to succeed in an opera career, Rankin went backstage and persuaded Traubel's accompanist, Coenraad V. Bos, to hear her sing. On Bos's advice, she moved to New York City to continue her studies with Karin Branzell. Her sister, Ruth Rankin, a soprano with similar ambitions, moved with her.

== Career ==
Rankin made her professional recital debut at Town Hall, in a joint recital with her sister, Ruth, in March 1947. This was followed by her operatic debut as Amneris in a production of Aida at the Salmaggi Opera Company in Brooklyn, with her sister in the title role. Nell Rankin joined the Opernhaus Zürich in 1948, where she made her debut as Ortrud in Wagner's Lohengrin. She stayed with the company for two years and sang 126 performances with the company during her first year alone. In 1950 she joined Theater Basel, where she performed Amneris in Aida and Dalila in Saint-Saëns's Samson et Dalila. That same year she became the first American singer to win the first prize at the International Music Competition in Geneva, which raised Rankin's profile in the opera world; she soon received invitations to perform at many of the world's best opera houses.

In 1951 she debuted at the Teatro alla Scala, the Vienna State Opera, and the Metropolitan Opera, all in the role of Amneris in Aida. That same year she recorded the role of Suzuki in Puccini's Madama Butterfly, opposite Renata Tebaldi, for Decca Records and was a soloist in La Scala's production of Verdi's Requiem under Victor de Sabata, with Renata Tebaldi, Giacinto Prandelli and Nicola Rossi-Lemeni. In 1953, she made her debuts at the Royal Opera House, Covent Garden, and the San Francisco Opera, both in the title role of Bizet's Carmen. She also gave a solo recital for Queen Elizabeth II in honor of her Coronation. Also in 1953, she gave her first solo recital in New York City at Town Hall. The New York Times said of her performance, "Not only is Miss Rankin's a voice of power and range, but it is as warm as the red color of the dress she wore. Her voice is beautifully trained so that it flows purely and evenly no matter how long sustained or how quickly stated."

Rankin was one of the singers honored in the Metropolitan Opera's Centennial Concert in 1983. Many veteran singers of the company were asked to sit on the stage for the second half of the performance. In a 2002 Opera News interview, Rankin said that the single most memorable musical event in her career took place in 1952. Her husband was in the Air Force in North Africa, and she was engaged to give a solo concert on the Mediterranean coast, in an open-air theater forty miles outside Tripoli. "Imagine", says Rankin, "Libya was still a kingdom then, and King Idris had a piano flown in from Egypt, while an American cruiser was stationed near the shore to illuminate the stage. The whole thing was unreal and unforgettable."

Although Rankin made appearances with several major companies throughout her career, she spent most of her time in New York City performing at the Metropolitan Opera between 1951 and 1976; there she sang the role of Carmen, the Princess di Bouillon in Cilea's Adriana Lecouvreur, Madelon in Giordano's Andrea Chénier, Santuzza in Mascagni's Cavalleria rusticana, Marina in Mussorgsky's Boris Godunov (in English), Giulietta in Offenbach's Les Contes d'Hoffmann, Herodias in Richard Strauss's Salome, Maddalena in Verdi's Rigoletto, Azucena in Verdi's Il trovatore, Princess Eboli in Verdi's Don Carlo, Ulrica in Verdi's Un ballo in maschera, Brangäne in Wagner's Tristan und Isolde, Gutrune in Wagner's Götterdämmerung, Fricka in Wagner's Die Walküre and Ortrud in Wagner's Lohengrin among others. Her last performance with the company was as Laura in Ponchielli's La Gioconda on April 16, 1976.

Other notable performances in Rankin's career include the starring role in CBS's television production of Carmen in 1954, and several productions at La Scala, including the role of Cassandra in Berlioz's Les Troyens in 1960. She made her Lyric Opera of Chicago debut in 1959 as Princess Eboli in Verdi's Don Carlo. She also appeared at the Teatro San Carlo in Naples as Adalgisa in Bellini's Norma in 1963. In 1971, she appeared as Carmen in the very first production made by the Lyric Opera Company of Long Island.

She appeared at the Teatro Colón, Bellas Artes Opera in Mexico City, the Liceu in Barcelona and a score of other companies in Europe and North America. She was an admired recitalist and concert singer throughout her career. She was asked often asked by Sir Rudolf Bing to look soprano roles such as Elsa in Lohengrin. "Mr. Bing, I AM a soprano, but I am a MEZZO soprano." This is advice she would also give her students. After she retired from the Metropolitan Opera, Rankin devoted herself to teaching, first at the Academy of Vocal Arts in Philadelphia, from 1977 to 1984. Among her students were Tenor Richard Burke, Bass-Baritone Lucas Ernst, and Mezzo-Soprano Wanda Brister. She taught privately in New York City until she retired in 1991.

== Recordings ==
Rankin made few commercial recordings during her career. Although she was under contract with Decca Records, her only Decca recording is Suzuki in Puccini's Madama Butterfly, with Renata Tebaldi in the title role. She sang in Beethoven's 9th Symphony recorded with the Columbia Symphony Orchestra and conducted by Bruno Walter. In 1955, for Capitol Records, Rankin recorded various Brahms pieces with Coenraad V. Bos on piano and Carlton Cooley on viola. Also for Capitol, she appears in Vaughan Williams’ “Five Tudor Portraits" with bass-baritone Robert B. Anderson, the Mendelssohn Choir of Pittsburgh, and the Pittsburgh Symphony Orchestra.

Along with standalone records, a number of notable live recordings have been made available on CD. These recordings include a 1951 recording of Rankin's Amneris in Aida that was conducted by Herbert von Karajan for radio broadcast in Vienna, a recording of Verdi's Requiem at La Scala from that same year, and the 1960 La Scala production of Berlioz's Les Troyens.

== Personal life ==
In 1952, Rankin married Dr. Hugh Clark Davidson, a physician. They had no children. They were married for 53 years.

Rankin died due to polycythemia vera, a rare blood cancer, in 2005, aged 81, at Cabrini Medical Center in New York City.
