= Wanda Brister =

American operatic mezzo-soprano

- Born: August 12, 1957 (age 69); Houma, Louisiana, U.S.

Academic background
- Education: University of Southern Mississippi (BMus); Academy of Vocal Arts; University of Louisiana at Lafayette (MMus); University of Nevada, Las Vegas (DMA)
- Thesis: The Songs of Madeleine Dring: Organizing a Posthumous Legacy (2003)

Academic work
- Discipline: Music
- Sub-discipline: Vocal music

Wanda Brister (born August 12, 1957) is an American operatic mezzo-soprano and voice teacher.

== Early life and education ==
Born in Houma, Louisiana, Brister matriculated at Loyola University New Orleans. She made her unofficial debut in 1978 as Maddalena in act four of Rigoletto, opposite Anthony Laciura as the Duke of Mantua. Two years later, she sang the Zia Principessa in Suor Angelica at Loyola. She earned a bachelor's degree in music from the University of Southern Mississippi and a master's degree in music from the University of Louisiana at Lafayette. After several years as a professional singer, she pursued and completed a Doctor of Musical Arts degree at University of Nevada, Las Vegas, where she studied with renowned vocal repertoire scholar Carol Kimball. Her dissertation topic was entitled "The Songs of Madeleine Dring: Organizing a Posthumous Legacy."

== Career ==
Brister was an apprentice at the New Orleans Opera Association (where she made her professional debut in 1981 as Mistress Benson in Lakmé) before attending the Academy of Vocal Arts in Philadelphia, where she then was an apprentice with Opera Philadelphia.

Brister studied under Nell Rankin from 1984 to 1990, a 24-year veteran of the Metropolitan Opera. Brister also worked with Beverly Wolff. Brister coached with Enrico Di Giuseppe, a tenor from the Metropolitan Opera in the early 1990s. She appeared with the Opera Orchestra of New York, Opera Company of Philadelphia, Baltimore Opera, Opera Theatre of Saint Louis, New York Opera Ensemble, Annapolis Opera, Pittsburgh Opera Theater, Connecticut Grand Opera, New England Lyric Operetta, Jefferson Performing Arts Society, Lyric Opera of Waco, Shreveport Opera, and orchestras in New York, Pennsylvania, Connecticut, Louisiana, Florida, Arizona, West Virginia, and New Hampshire. She has sung over 200 recitals in 43 states and brought this literature to festivals in Brazil, Bulgaria, Canada, England, Germany, Hungary, Italy, Lithuania, Poland, Russia, and Ukraine.

Brister has made several recordings, including Strauss Waltzes for Singing, (Arabesque with New York Vocal Arts Ensemble), Clarikinetics; Landscapes I: The Music of Daniel Baldwin; Landscapes II; Vocalise: Music for Voice, Bassoon, and Piano; (all on Mark Records). Her solo discs include: The Songs of Madeleine Dring with tenor Stanford Olsen, and Le premier matin du monde, In 2015, she recorded 17 pieces entitled "Cabaret Songs of Madeleine Dring" with Courtney Kenny (2018), and another 30 pieces in "Madeleine Dring: Lady Composer" (2022).

Brister has appeared as soloist at Carnegie Hall on seven occasions and has sung under the batons of Krzysztof Penderecki, Michael Tilson Thomas, John Rutter, John Nelson (conductor), Philippe Entremont, Arthur Fagen, Chris Nance, Leopold Hager, Gianfranco Masini, and Eve Queler. She has performed over 200 times with orchestra, including over 100 operatic performances. She has participated in choral ensembles with Michael Korn, Erich Leinsdorf, and Lorin Maazel.

From 1986 to 1988, Brister was a member of the quartet New York Vocal Arts Ensemble and continued to work with that ensemble on occasion through 1996. Together with this group, she traveled throughout the United States and appeared in concerts in the Soviet Union and in other Eastern Bloc countries from 1988 to 1992. She has sung throughout the North Atlantic with this quartet with Cunard Cruise lines as well as a solo tour of the American west coast with Epirotiki.

Brister has taught at Baylor University (1999–2000), the University of Arizona (2000–2003), and Florida State University (2003–2024). She has appeared at festivals including Steinfurt (Germany) Festival, Schwetzingen (Germany) Festival, Varna (Bulgaria) Fest, the IV International Festival of Winds in Rio de Janeiro, Brazil, as well as in concerts for the International Double Reed Society in Ithaca, New York, Birmingham, England, and Norman, Oklahoma.

Brister sang Mistress Benson (Lakmé) again in 2006 with the Opera Orchestra of New York, 25 years after her professional debut in the same part. She continued to appear in recitals and concerts until it became difficult to sing as the result of a lung disease sarcoidosis. She is recently (2024)received a double lung transplant at University of Florida Pulmonary Hospital. She offers lectures to pedagogy classes on this topic as well as being a good will ambassador for transplants and sarcoidosis. Brister's students sing at companies throughout the United States and Europe and many have faculty positions in American, European, and Chinese universities.

She was a teaching intern with the National Association of Teachers of Singing under the acclaimed vocal pedagogue, James McKinney, and has published articles with the Journal of Singing. She has also published about auditioning for college programs for Florida MTNA and submitted articles to the International Alliance for Women in Music, for which she served as a member of the board of directors, and has been published in the Light Music Society Journal of Great Britain. She won an award from that society for her 2018 release of Madeleine Dring Cabaret Songs. She has also received positive reviews for her recordings in the Journal of Singing and the International Double Reed Society Journal, as well as the Journal of the Light Music Society. Her recent book, Madeleine Dring: Lady Composer (Clemson University Press, Liverpool University Press, Oxford University Press, 2020, received positive reviews from Graham Johnson, Joseph Horovitz, Carol Kimball, the International Double Reed Society Journal, the British Double Reed Society, the NATS Journal of Singing, and journals of the Kapralova Society, the Light Music Society, and the International Alliance for Women in Music.

She was faculty artist for the Orfeo Music Festival in Sterzing from 2010 to 2015, and was artist faculty of the Schlern International Music Festival (2006–2009). In 2013, she presented on Madeleine Dring to the International Congress of Voice Teachers in Brisbane, Australia. She has also presented for the National Association of Teachers of Singing national conference in Las Vegas and the Music by Women Festival in 2018, 2019, 2020, and 2022 as well as the Women Composers Festival of Hartford of 2019. Brister compiled and edited a series of 10 scores published by Classical Vocal Reprints. Madeleine Dring's only opera, Cupboard Love, as well as nine volumes of the previously unavailable vocal music were published are in this series. She has written a Madeleine Dring biography with her former colleague, Jay Rosenblatt (Clemson University Press, University of Liverpool Press, 2020) entitled Madeleine Dring: Lady Composer.

== Discography ==
- 1988: Strauss Waltzes for Singing New York Vocal Arts Ensemble, Arabesque Records, New York.
- 2006: Le premier matin du monde Songs of Fauré, Debussy, Poulenc, Satie, and Ernest Chausson. Cambria Records.
- 2006: Clarikinetics with Debora Bish, Clarinet, Mark Records.
- 2010: Landscapes: Music by Daniel Baldwin, Mark Records.
- 2013: Songs of Madeleine Dring, with Tenor Stanford Olsen, Cambria Music.
- 2013: Trio Vocalise: Music by Laitman, Baldwin, McLarry, Chabrier.
- 2018: Cabaret Songs of Madeleine Dring: Cambria Music.
- 2022: Madeleine Dring: The Lady Composer: Cambria Music.
