= An Unsuitable Job for a Woman (film) =

1982 film

- Trade advertisement
- Directed by: Chris Petit
- Screenplay by: Elizabeth McKay; Chris Petit; Brian Scobie
- Based on: An Unsuitable Job for a Woman by P. D. James
- Produced by: Peter McKay; Michael Relph
- Starring: Billie Whitelaw; Paul Freeman; Pippa Guard
- Cinematography: Martin Schäfer
- Edited by: Mick Audsley
- Production companies: Goldcrest Films; National Film Finance Corporation
- Distributed by: Goldcrest Films
- Release dates: 16 February 1982 (Berlinale); 21 May 1982 (United Kingdom)
- Running time: 94 minutes
- Country: United Kingdom
- Language: English
- Budget: £750,000

An Unsuitable Job for a Woman is a 1982 British psychological thriller film directed by Chris Petit and starring Billie Whitelaw, Paul Freeman, and Pippa Guard. It follows a young female private investigator who is hired to investigate the mysterious suicide of a university student, only to uncover a number of disturbing secrets about his family. The film is based on the 1972 novel of the same name by P. D. James. It marked the first adaptation of the novel, followed by a television series adaptation produced in 1997.

The film was entered into the 32nd Berlin International Film Festival.

== Plot ==
After her former boss, private detective Bernie Pryde, dies and leaves her his agency, Cordelia Gray is hired to investigate the suicide of Mark Callendar, a promising university student from a powerful family who abruptly abandoned his studies, moved to a remote cottage, and took employment as a gardener and handyman before hanging himself. Cordelia is hired by Mark's father, James, a prominent real estate developer, and his aloof assistant, Elizabeth.

Cordelia visits the cottage where Mark committed suicide and speaks with Miss Markland, the property owner who discovered Mark's body. Cordelia then travels to the nearby Callendar family's country house, where she is left in the company of Elizabeth, who shows her home movies of Mark. Cordelia is subsequently met by Andrew, a family friend and elder brother figure to Mark.

Cordelia goes to visit Mark's university friend Isobel, who rebuffs her when she suspects Cordelia is a journalist. Cordelia learns from the coroner that traces of purple lipstick were found on Mark's mouth, leading them to believe a woman kissed him prior to his death. Cordelia suspects the woman to be Isobel. Upon further questioning, Isobel recounts to Cordelia how she in fact discovered Mark's body in the cottage the night he died, and that he was wearing women's underwear and had purple lipstick smeared across his mouth. Isobel claims to have phoned Andrew, but says she left his body untouched. When Cordelia questions Andrew, he claims he went to see Mark's body, but that Mark was not wearing women's clothing or lipstick as Isobel had claimed.

A perplexed Cordelia returns to the cottage and attempts to recreate Mark's suicide using crime scene photographs and the belt he fashioned as a noose. The attempt goes awry when Cordelia nearly hangs herself, only to be saved by a young boy who happens to witness the incident through the window. Later, Cordelia is approached by a confrontational Andrew, who threatens her. Upon finding clues in a prayer book in Mark's cottage, Cordelia concludes that his mother Eve, who died during Mark's childhood, was not in fact his biological mother; Eve left a clue suggesting such in the prayer book, which had been recently given to Mark by Elizabeth on his 21st birthday. Cordelia confronts Elizabeth about this, as Elizabeth claims to have delivered Mark in Italy when she was working there as a nurse. Elizabeth tells Cordelia she will meet her at the cottage later that night to discuss the matter.

Upon returning to the cottage, Cordelia is attacked by Andrew, who has hidden in an upstairs closet, and is thrown into a well on the property. Cordelia manages to climb out of the well, and watches from a distance as Andrew goes to check to see if she has drowned. Upon finding the well empty, Andrew flees in his car, only to be followed by Cordelia. The two engage in a chase, ending in Andrew driving off of a bridge and into a river, killing himself. Cordelia returns to the Callendar estate, where she is met by Elizabeth, who admits to having given birth to Mark on behalf of the infertile Eve, as James wanted an heir to the family estate. Elizabeth agreed, and carried and birthed Mark under a contractual agreement. Elizabeth also admits to being the one who removed the lingerie and lipstick from Mark's body, and that she summoned Cordelia, not James, to investigate.

Cordelia realizes that it was James who in fact murdered Mark, angry over his son's defiance of his family upon learning the true circumstances of his birth. James staged Mark's death to appear as a suicide, and dressed his body in the women's lingerie and lipstick to humiliate him. Cordelia and Elizabeth arrive at the scene of Andrew's death near the river, where they find a despondent James. When Cordelia accuses him of Mark's murder, he denies it. Elizabeth coldly shoots James to death, and is swiftly taken away by authorities.

== Cast ==
- Billie Whitelaw as Elizabeth Leaming
- Paul Freeman as James Callendar
- Pippa Guard as Cordelia Gray
- Dominic Guard as Andrew Lunn
- Elizabeth Spriggs as Miss Markland
- David Horovitch as Sergeant Maskell
- Dawn Archibald as Isobel
- Bernadette Shortt as Temp
- James Gilbey as Boy
- Kelda Holmes as Girl
- Margaret Wade as Secretary
- Alex Guard as Mark Callender

== Release ==
An Unsuitable Job for a Woman was released theatrically in London on 13 May 1982.

=== Box office ===
Goldcrest Films provided £316,000, just under half the budget. Jake Eberts of Goldcrest said he was reluctant to invest in the film but had been persuaded by David Puttnam's enthusiasm for the director. The film was a financial disappointment and Goldcrest made a loss of £120,000.

=== Critical response ===
In a review in The New York Times, Janet Maslin wrote "As befits an English country house mystery, the film has enough wood paneling, wildflowers and overall gentility to appeal to the genre's most ardent fans. But a couple of the film's transitions are abrupt enough to make the head spin, and its final action sequences are woefully perfunctory. The denouement is as disappointing as Mr. Petit's inability to breathe life into Cordelia, her sleuthing and her peculiar obsession." A review in Variety summarized; "Perhaps it is unfair to unravel this tale which is handled from a distance by director Christopher Petit robbing it of a more forceful narration, timing and revelation."

== See also ==
- An Unsuitable Job for a Woman (TV series)
