= Madeleine Dring =

English composer and actress (1923–1977)

Madeleine Winefride Isabelle Dring (7 September 1923 – 26 March 1977) was an English composer, pianist, singer, and actress.

== Life ==
Madeleine Dring spent the first four years of her life at Raleigh Road, Harringay, before the family moved to Streatham. She showed talent at an early age and was accepted into the junior department of the Royal College of Music where she began on her tenth birthday. She was offered scholarships for violin and piano and chose violin. She studied piano as a secondary instrument, with RCM students guiding her studies for the first several years.

As part of their training, all of the students performed in the children's theatre under the guidance of Angela Bull. Dring formally began composition studies at the junior department with Stanley Drummond Wolff in 1937, in 1938 with Leslie Fly, and worked with Sir Percy Buck for the next two years. Near the end of her studies, she was assigned to Lilian Gaskell for piano studies. She continued at the Royal College for senior-level studies where her composition teacher was Herbert Howells. She had occasional lessons with Ralph Vaughan Williams (an official substitute for Howells). She dropped the violin study after the death of her instructor, W.H. Reed, at the end of the first year. She focused on piano and composition and studied mime, drama, and singing. Dring's love of theatre and music co-mingled; many of her earliest professional creations were for the stage, radio, and television.

In 1947, she married Roger Lord who was principal oboist with London Symphony Orchestra for over thirty years. She composed several works for Roger, including Dances for solo oboe. Soon after her marriage, her first pieces were published with Lengnick and with Oxford (1948). The Lords had one son in 1950.

Dring died at age 53 in 1977 of a cerebral hemorrhage. Dring's tombstone was recently uncovered (in situ) at Lambeth Cemetery in Streatham. Both Roger and their son, Jeremy, died in 2014. Roger died at age 90 and Jeremy died of Amyotrophic lateral sclerosis (ALS).

A book, Madeleine Dring: Her Music, Her Life, by Ro Hancock-Child, was published in 2000 (2nd edition 2009), and included cartoon illustrations from Dring's own notebooks interpreted by Hancock-Child. The biography was partially funded by Dring's husband, Roger Lord, in order to disseminate information about his late wife's compositions. Several articles, compact disc recordings, and inclusions of Dring's biographical information in books about composers have secured her name a place in the modern lexicon.

Another book, Madeleine Dring: Lady Composer by Wanda Brister and Jay Rosenblatt was published in 2020 by Clemson University Press and Liverpool University Press and is distributed by OUP. Over 100 pages of footnotes and references are included in this volume as well as complete works lists and document performances by Dring.

Both of these authors have also worked to record and publish works by Dring.

In the middle of the neighbourhood in which Dring spent most of her life, the Streatham and Clapham High School Dining Hall is named after her. She did not attend this school, but attended La Retraite Roman Catholic Girls' School in Clapham Park.

== Music ==
Dring's favourite composer in her youth was Rachmaninov and she owned much piano and vocal sheet music by Rachmaninov, which is now in the possession of Ro Hancock-Child. Dring studied with Herbert Howells but her own work shows no debt to his musical style. Occasionally she was taught by Ralph Vaughan Williams but again there is little obvious influence, and her music does not reflect the English folk song tradition, although she studied this genre as a singer. She sometimes set a text she had encountered in a solo or choral work. She looked further afield.

Dring particularly enjoyed (and imitated) the mannerisms of Poulenc, for instance in the accompaniment to her song I Feed A Flame. As observed by Ro Hancock-Child, Dring preferred jazzy idioms, Gershwin, Cole Porter and the sunny style of Arthur Benjamin. Having heard calypso music in London, she responded with her own Caribbean Dance and West Indian Dance, for piano.

Dring deliberately did not repeat her musical material from piece to piece, always finding a fresh approach to harmony and rhythm. If her vocal music has ever been compared to Roger Quilter (possibly because of similar text choices) it is a mistaken comparison. Quilter was solidly Victorian in outlook, and his songs are deeply melodic and contrapuntal. By contrast, Dring looked to the future, and thrived on novelty and surprise, hoping that what she wrote might gently shock or make you smile. Her vocal melodies arise from the underlying harmonies and can be difficult to pitch: the chords come first, as Ro Hancock-Child observes. Dring wrote most of her songs for her own use: she had a soprano voice with a wide range, and perfect pitch. Several informal and informative recordings exist of Dring singing and playing her own compositions.

Dring's cabaret songs and West End Revue material sometimes featured her own lyrics. They have recently been recorded and published by several artists.

Dring chose not to compose large-scale works, therefore most of her output was in shorter forms. She wrote pieces for solo piano, piano duets, songs with piano, and some chamber music, including pieces for piano duo, flute, oboe, harmonica, recorder, and clarinet, a small number of which are pedagogical works. Her works for television and radio are all within a 45-minute time frame or shorter. She completed a one-act opera, Cupboard Love with her friend D.F. Aitken (never performed during her lifetime, but it was published in 2017 and received its stage premiere in the United States in April 2018 at Florida State University and its European premiere in Scotland in June 2019). A dance drama entitled The Fair Queen of Wu which was broadcast on BBC Television in 1951. The ballet called for a full company of soloists who were off camera. She was commissioned to write music for "The Real Princess," a ballet and for several stage plays in London given from 1946 to 1971. She often collaborated with Felicity Gray, choreographer, and D.F. Aitken, librettist.

== Works ==
Dring rarely provided dates for her compositions; many dates come from Alistair Fisher's treatise on her songs. Publication dates have been provided, many of which are posthumously published by her husband, Roger Lord. Some dates have more recently been re-established using dates of first performances and other information as confirmed in Dring's personal papers as well as in archival newspaper reviews. In 2018 three volumes of songs were engraved and published as well as four volumes of cabaret and musical revue numbers. Duets and ensembles were also published.

=== Instrumental ===
- Italian Dance (1960) Oboe and Piano
- Fantasy Sonata in one Movement (1938, published 1948), solo piano
- Three Fantastic Variations on Lilliburlero for Two Pianos (1948), two pianos
- Jig (1948), piano
- Prelude and Toccata (1948), piano
- Tarantelle (1948), piano duet
- Festival Scherzo: Nights in the Garden of Battersea (1951), piano and string orchestra;
- Sonata for two pianos (1951)
- March: for the New Year (1954), piano
- Caribbean Dance (Tempo Tobago) (1959), piano duet or solo
- Dance Suite (1961), piano
- Polka (1962), oboe and piano
- Colour Suite (1963), piano
- Danza Gaya (1965), two pianos or oboe and piano (original score housed at Royal College of Music, London)
- Three Dances (1968; Josef Weinberger), piano
- Trio for Flute, Oboe, and Piano (1968)
- Valse française (1980), solo or duo piano * (original scores housed at Royal College of Music, London)
- Three Pieces: WIB Waltz, Sarabande, Tango (1983), flute and piano*
- Waltz (1983), oboe and piano*
- Suite (1984), harmonica and piano (later arranged by Roger Lord for oboe)*
- Trio for oboe, bassoon, and harpsichord (1986)* (original score housed at Royal College of Music, London)
- Idyll for oboe (viola) and piano (The composer's husband Roger Lord, disappointed that the piece remained unplayed and unpublished for many years, perhaps because of its chromaticism, decided to transcribe the solo part for oboe, his own instrument, to which it is well suited. Idyll was first recorded in 2007 by Thierry Cammaert, oboist of the Quartz Ensemble, a Belgian winds ensemble. The ensemble has also performed the work as a trio for flute, oboe and piano.)

=== Vocal ===
- Three Shakespeare Songs (original score housed at Royal College of Music, London), (1949) (Published by Legnick 1949, republished with 4 additional Shakespeare songs, Thames 1992, published as Dring Volume 1)* First performance 10 May 1944 with Ifor Evans, Baritone, Madeleine Dring, Accompanist, performed at the RCM
- Thank you, Lord (1953), vocal, text L. Kyme (not published as composed - Dring did not approve of this edition)
- An additional four songs with texts by L. Kyme were written in 1953. They have now been published.
- The Pigtail (1963) vocal duet, text A. von Chamisso.
- Dedications: Five poems by R. Herrick (1967), vocal suite (published 1992 by Thames as Dring Volume 2)* (original score housed at Royal College of Music, London)
- Love and time: Four Songs (1970s) (published in 1994 by Thames as Dring Volume 5)*
- Four Night Songs: texts of Michael Armstrong (1976), (published 1985 Cambria (US) 1992 Thames as Dring Volume 3)*
- Five Betjeman Songs (1976) (published in 1980 by Weinberger)* (original score housed at Royal College of Music, London)
- Seven Songs for Medium Voice (various compositional dates, compiled and published by Thames in 1993 as Dring Volume 4)*
- Six Songs for High Voice (various compositional dates, compiled and published by Thames in 1999 as Dring Volume 6)* Includes: My true-love hath my heart, Echoes, The Cherry Blooming, The Parting, The Enchantment, Love is a Sickness
- Previously Unpublished Vocal Works Volume 1: Art Songs and Arrangements: Lyrics of Shakespeare, Herrick, Rossetti, Ellison, Anon, and Arrangements of Horn, Pinsuti, Kjerulf, and Pattison. Classical Vocal Reprints, Fayetteville, AR. Published 2018 Copyright Simon Lord.
- Previously Unpublished Vocal Works Volume 2: Cabaret Songs: All Music and Lyrics of Madeleine Dring. Classical Vocal Reprints, Fayetteville, AR. Published 2018 Copyright Simon Lord.
- Previously Unpublished Vocal Works Volume 3: More Art Songs: Lyrics of Cibber, Marlowe, Goldsmith, Blake, Dring, Longfellow, and Tynan. Classical Vocal Reprints, Fayetteville, AR. Published 2018 Copyright Simon Lord.
- Previously Unpublished Vocal Works Volume 4: More Cabaret Songs: Lyrics of Madeleine Dring and Charlotte Mitchell. Classical Vocal Reprints, Fayetteville, AR. Published 2018 Copyright Simon Lord.
- Previously Unpublished Vocal Works Volume 5: Still More Art Songs, Arrangements, and Love Songs: Lyrics of Herrick, Campbell, Lord, Dring, and Kyme. Classical Vocal Reprints, Fayetteville, AR. Published 2018 Copyright Simon Lord.
- Previously Unpublished Vocal Works Volume 6: Still More Cabaret and Theatre Songs: Lyrics of Dring, Mitchell, Vanbrugh, and Bridie. Classical Vocal Reprints, Fayetteville, AR. Published 2018 Copyright Simon Lord.
- Previously Unpublished Vocal Works Volume 7: Cabaret Duets: Lyrics of Aitken, Breton, Dring, Howitt, Lear, Mitchell, and Rafferty. Classical Vocal Reprints, Fayetteville, AR. Published 2018 Copyright Simon Lord.
- Previously Unpublished Vocal Works Volume 8: Cabaret Ensembles of 3 or More Voices: Lyrics of Dring, Mitchell, and Aitken. Classical Vocal Reprints, Fayetteville, AR. Published 2018 Copyright Simon Lord.
- Previously Unpublished Vocal Works Volume 9: Songs from West End Revues: Lyrics of Dring, Mitchell, and Rafferty. Classical Vocal Reprints, Fayetteville, AR. Published 2018 Copyright Simon Lord.

=== Theatre, drama, and television ===
==== Incidental music ====
- The Emperor and the Nightingale (1941) Performed at the RCM 20 December 1941. No score is available at this time.
- Tobias and the Angel (1946) Incidental music and two songs published 2018
- Somebody’s Murdered Uncle (1947) for BBC radio; Duets: "I should have trusted you darling" and "There's nothing to stop us now" There are also two quartets: "There's no such thing as a perfect crime" and "Bloggins, Birch, and Frome," as well as a solo entitled, "J. Allington Slade." Songs published 2018
- The Buskers (1959), for which she provided music for the Wedding Song, not located at this time.
- Little Laura Cartoons (1960–61), Dring provided and played music for six episodes. Four episodes were broadcast in New Zealand in 1976.
- The Jackpot Question (1961), for Associated TV, repeated in 1962 with another cast.
- The Whisperers (1961), for ITV Season 7, Episode 7.
- The Provok’d Wife (1963), texts by Vanbrugh: Four pieces typeset by Alistair Fisher. Published in 2018
- The Lady and the Clerk (1964), for Associated TV
- I Can Walk Where I Like, Can’t I? (1964), for Associated TV
- When the Wind Blows (1965), for Associated TV
- Helen and Edward and Henry (1966), for Associated TV
- Variation on a Theme (1966), for Associated TV

==== Musical revues ====
- Airs on a Shoestring (1953) Songs: "Model Models," "Films on the Cheap Side at Cheapside" "Strained Relations," and "Snowman" (all lyrics by Charlotte Mitchell), "Sing High, Sing Low" (Lyrics by Madeleine Dring). Songs published 2018
- Pay the Piper (1954) "Pay the Piper" (Lyrics at BL) Location of song scores unknown at this time).
- From Here and There (1955) "Resolutions" and "Life Sentence" (Lyrics Charlotte Mitchell) (Lyrics at BL) (Location of song scores unknown at this time)
- Fresh Airs (1955) "Mother knows," Sketch "Witchery," and "Miss Spenser," (Lyricist Madeleine Dring) (Lyrics at BL, but location of song score for Miss Spenser unknown at this time). Mother knows published 2018
- Child’s Play (1958) Overture, "High in the Pines," "Love Song," and "Hearts and Arrows" have been recovered. (Location of scores for four other songs missing this time)) (Lyricist Sean Rafferty) These are not at the BL because Players' Theatre is a private club and was not censored.
- Four to the Bar (1961) "Diedre" was included in this, also known as "Mother knows" from "Fresh Airs"(Lyricist Madeleine Dring.) An LP was produced by Philips of this music. Published 2018.

==== Ballet ====
- Waiting for ITMA (1947), for BBC TV
- The Real Princess (1971), scored for 2 pianos

==== Opera ====
- Cupboard Love (performed posthumously 19 December 1983, at St John's Smith Square by Intimate Opera Company). Published in 2017 by Classical Vocal Reprints, Fayetteville, AR, American staged Premiere in April 2018, Florida State University. European staged premiere Byre Opera, St Andrews University scheduled for June 2019. London staged premiere by The Operatists, Tête à Tête Opera Festival 6 September 2023.

==== Other compositions ====
- The Wild Swans (1950), children's play, Cygnet Company
- The Fair Queen of Wu (1951), dance-drama for BBC TV, Score at RCM
- The Marsh Kings’s Daughter (1951), children’s play, Cygnet Company
- The Scarlet Crabapple, Cygnet Company

== Sources ==
- Banfield, Stephen, "Madeleine Dring". Grove Music online. (subscription access)
- Barnett, Rob, "Madeleine Dring: her life and Music by Ro Hancock-Child" (review of 2000 edition), MusicWeb International, April 2000
- Berg, Gregory,"The Listeners Gallery: Songs of Madeleine Dring" Journal of Singing, Sept/Oct 2014, Vol 71, No 1, pp. 128–131.
- Berg, Gregory,"The Listeners Gallery: Cabaret Songs of Madeleine Dring" Journal of Singing, May/June 2019, Vol 75, No 5, pp. 621–625.
- Brister, Wanda, CD: Courtney Kenny, Nuala Willis, Matt Cooksey, "Madeleine Dring: Lady Composer," Cambria Music, 2022 liner notes. 30 vocal selections. Selections from stage, revues, radio, and song.
- Brister, Wanda and Jay Rosenblatt, "Madeleine Dring: Lady Composer," Clemson University Press 2020 (full academic biography) 356 pages.
- Brister, Wanda, The Songs of Madeleine Dring: Organizing a Posthumous Legacy, DMA dissertation, University of Nevada, Las Vegas, 2004. (Biography, overview of works, examination of art songs.)
- Brister, Wanda, "The Songs of Madeleine Dring," Journal of Singing: The Official Journal of the National Association of Teachers of Singing Vol 64 No 5, pp. 565–578. (Biographical sketch and discussion of all published art songs by 2004.)
- Brister, Wanda, CD: "The Songs of Madeleine Dring," Cambria Music, 2013 liner notes. 40 vocal selections.
- Brister, Wanda, CD: Courtney Kenny, Nuala Willis, "The Cabaret Songs of Madeleine Dring," Cambria Music, 2018 liner notes. 17 vocal selections.
- Brister, Wanda,"Madeleine Dring" (biographical notes), inside each volume of Previously Unpublished Vocal Works, Classical Vocal Reprints, Fayetteville, AR. (c) Wanda Brister.
- Davis, Richard, "The Published Songs of Madeleine Dring". Journal of Singing. March/April 2007. Vol.63. Nr. 4. pp. 393-403.
- Fisher, Alistair, The Songs of Madeleine Dring and the Evolution of Her Compositional Style, Bachelor's thesis, University of Hull, 2000
- Hancock-Child, Ro, Madeleine Dring: Her Music, Her Life 2nd edition, Micropress 2009 (biography and full catalogue of works)
- Kimball, Carol, "Madeleine Dring," article in Song: A Guide to Art Song Style and Literature, Rev ed, Hal Leonard 2006, pp 401–403. (biographical sketch, short look at vocal works, includes bibliography.)
- Lord, Roger, biographical notes, Thames/Elkins volumes of songs.
- Roland-Silverstein, Kathleen, "Past Treasures and New Discoveries," Journal of Singing, Nov/Dec 2018, Vol 75, No. 2, pp. 227–230. Review of newly published works.
