= Laurier Lister =

English theatre writer, actor, director, and producer

- Lister in the 1950s
- Born: George Laurier Lister; 22 April 1907; Croydon, Surrey, England
- Died: 30 September 1986 (aged 79); London, England
- Occupations: Theatre writer, actor, director, producer

George Laurier Lister, OBE (22 April 1907 – 30 September 1986) was an English theatre writer, actor, director and producer, best known for a series of revues presented in London in the late 1940s and 1950s. He was later associated with Laurence Olivier in the West End and at the Chichester Festival. From 1964 to 1975 he was director and administrator of the Yvonne Arnaud Theatre in Guildford.

== Life and career ==
=== Early years ===
Laurier Lister was born in Sanderstead, Croydon, Surrey, the son of an English father, George Daniel Lister, and an American mother, Susie May Lister, née Kooy. He was educated at Dulwich College and then studied for the stage at the Royal Academy of Dramatic Art. He made his first professional appearance on the stage at the Globe Theatre, London, on 20 February 1925, as a dancer in the nightclub scene in Harry Graham's comedy The Grand Duchess. At the Duke of York's Theatre in June, 1926 he appeared in Noël Coward's Easy Virtue in a non-speaking role. He played for six months at the Little Theatre, Bristol and then appeared at the Stratford-on-Avon Memorial Theatre Theatre in a season in which The Taming of the Shrew, Macbeth, Twelfth Night, Much Ado About Nothing, Hamlet, and Henry the Fifth were played. He toured in Egypt with Robert Atkins's Shakespearean company and returned to Stratford-on-Avon in 1928–29

=== 1930s ===
In 1930 Lister toured in South Africa with Olga Lindo's company in a repertory of six plays including The Constant Nymph. On his return he appeared at the Savoy Theatre in June 1931 with Mabel Terry-Lewis and Celia Johnson in Death Takes a Holiday in the role of Eric Fenton. Throughout the 1930s he was frequently seen on the London stage. His roles included Sebastian in Twelfth Night (1933) to the Viola of Margaretta Scott, Corporal Martiez in Cabbages and Kings (1933), Arthur Stone in Hervey House (1934), Edgar Linton in Wuthering Heights (1935), Rylands in Immortal Garden (1936) and Lord Times in A Kiss for Cinderella (1937). In 1938 he played Lieut Commander Richard Sanford in Charles Morgan's "The Flashing Stream," and played the same part at the Biltmore Theatre, New York in April 1939, in a cast that included Felix Aylmer, Leo Genn, Margaret Rawlings and Godfrey Tearle.

In addition to acting in the West End, Lister co-wrote five plays seen in London in the 1930s: The Soldier and the Gentlewoman (with Dorothy Massingham), 1933; When the Bough Breaks (with Henrietta Leslie), 1936; The Tree (with Leslie), 1937; Against Our Hearts (with Max Adrian), 1937; and She, Too, Was Young (with Hilda Vaughan), 1938. The first of these was described by The Saturday Review as "arid, yet revolting", and closed within a fortnight. Of the others, only the last was modestly successful, running for 110 performances.

=== Revues and later career ===
Lister served in the Royal Air Force in the Second World War. After the war he became a West End producer and director. In the late 1940s and the 1950s he devised, directed and produced a series of highly successful revues, with such artists as Max Adrian, Joyce Grenfell, Elizabeth Welch, Ian Wallace, Rose Hill and Betty Marsden, with material by, among others, Michael Flanders, Donald Swann, Alan Melville, Sandy Wilson, Madeleine Dring and Richard Addinsell. Tuppence Coloured (1947) was followed by Oranges and Lemons (1948), Penny Plain (1951), Airs on a Shoestring (1953), Pay the Piper (1954); Joyce Grenfell Requests the Pleasure (1954), From Here and There (1955) and Fresh Airs (1956). In a survey of his shows in 1955 The Stage called Lister "our most progressive producer of light entertainment" and remarked on the "deep impression" he had made in the West End theatre.

In 1958, Lister became artistic director of Laurence Olivier's play producing company. In that capacity he was responsible for several important productions, and when Olivier took charge of the Chichester Festival, Lister was his assistant for the first two seasons, dealing with finance and casting for what The Times called "such distinguished productions as The Broken Heart, Uncle Vanya and Saint Joan".

From 1964 to 1975 Lister was director and administrator of the Yvonne Arnaud Theatre in Guildford. He was awarded the OBE in 1976.

=== Personal life ===
Lister had a long personal relationship with the actor Max Adrian, with whom he lived in a cottage in Shamley Green in Surrey. Adrian died in 1973; Lister outlived him by thirteen years, dying on 30 September 1986 at the age of 79.

== References and sources ==
=== Sources ===
- Gaye, Freda, ed. (1967). Who's Who in the Theatre (fourteenth ed.). London: Sir Isaac Pitman and Sons. OCLC 5997224.
- Herbert, Ian, ed. (1972). Who's Who in the Theatre (fifteenth ed.). London: Sir Isaac Pitman and Sons. ISBN 978-0-273-31528-5.
- Wearing, J. P. (2014). The London Stage 1930–1939: A Calendar of Productions, Performers, and Personnel. Lanham: Rowman & Littlefield. ISBN 978-0-81-089304-7.
