= Lord Chamberlain's requirements =

The Lord Chamberlain's requirements were a set of four prerequisites for a licence for a production in British theatres. These were printed in theatre programmes so the audience could be aware of them. The Lord Chamberlain's Office had control of theatres until 1968, including censorship of the production content as well as for logistical matters. In the 1980s, they were replaced by similar requirements applied by a local licensing authority.

The original regulations were officially known as the Lord Chamberlain's Regulations, but as they were printed in every programme as "The Lord Chamberlain's Requirements", this became their accepted name.

The requirements cover:

1. Leaving the theatre at the end of the performance.
2. Freedom of gangways and passages from obstruction.
3. Limitations on standees.
4. Operation of the safety curtain during each performance.

Three of the requirements (leaving the theatre, freedom of the gangways and the operation of the safety curtain) were set to music by Donald Swann for the revue Fresh Airs and were later used as encores for the Flanders and Swann revue At the Drop of a Hat.

== Example ==
The following is a sample text of the Lord Chamberlain's Regulations from the programme of a performance by the Théâtre du Nouveau Monde at the Old Vic during the Commonwealth Arts Festival of 1965.

In accordance with the requirements of the Lord Chamberlain:

1. The public may leave at the end of the performance by all exit doors and such doors must at that time be open.
2. All gangways, passages and staircases must be kept entirely free from chairs or any other obstructions.
3. Persons shall not in any circumstances be permitted to stand in any of the gangways intersecting the seating or to stand in any of the other gangways. If standing be permitted in the gangways at the sides and rear of the seating, it shall be strictly limited to the number indicated by the notices exhibited in those positions.
4. The safety curtain must be lowered and raised in the presence of each audience.
