= Maud West =

English detective (1880–1964)

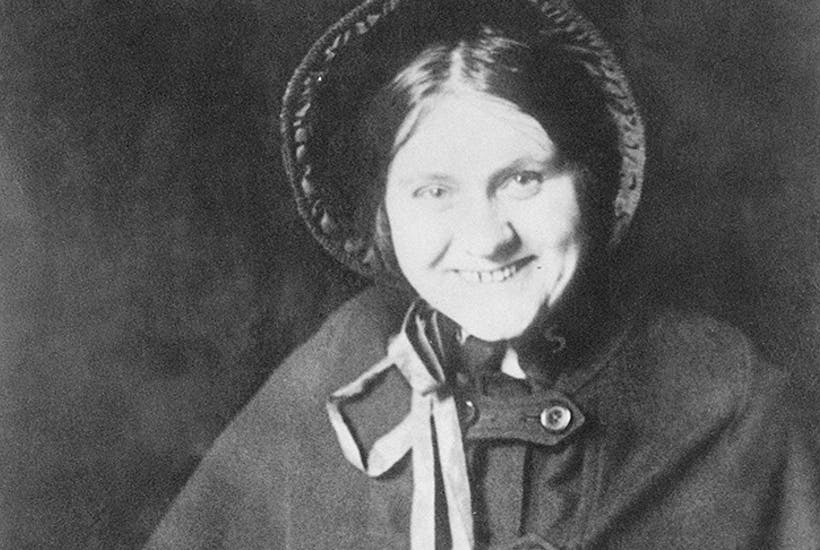
Maud West disguised as a Salvation Army worker, c. 1920.

Maud West (born Edith Maria Barber; 15 September 1880 – 13 March 1964) was an English detective.

== Early life and family ==
West was born at 28 Staunton Street, Deptford, on 15 September 1880, the illegitimate daughter of Mary Ann Barber, a domestic servant.

== Career ==
West worked as a draper's assistant before founding her detective agency in London in 1905, her office was in Albion House on New Oxford Street.

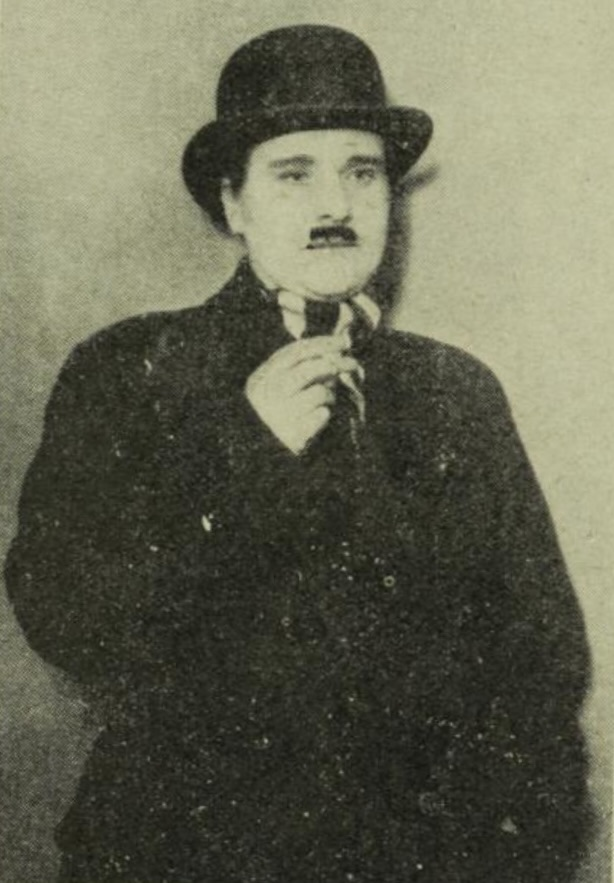
West in 1926 disguised as a man

Much of West's work was connected with divorce, missing persons and blackmail cases but she was an accomplished self-publicist and had risen to prominence as 'London's Lady detective' by the 1920s. In an edition of The Sphere in 1926, West was featured in Sketches of People in the Public Eye alongside the composer Richard Strauss, the performer Little Tich and inventor Richard H Granger. The feature said of West: “on several occasions she has found herself confronted with a revolver in the hand of a desperate man, and only pluck and a sense of humour has saved her life.”

West wrote about her adventures in Pearson’s Weekly and regional and tabloid newspapers; although much sensationalised and of dubious accuracy, her stories included entertaining tales of how she'd unwittingly been hired by German intelligence during WWI and travelled to South Africa to bring a 'dope fiend' back to England. West prided herself on her use of disguise and promoted her work by distributing photographs of herself in various guises. In 1926, West claimed that she had been invited to a seance to shoot a revolver at a spirit in order to test whether the apparition was real or not; she stated, “This experience will be the most remarkable in the whole of my career, and there can be few women who have packed more excitement and adventure into their lives.”

In 1932, West was involved in the high-profile divorce case of Lord Inverclyde whose solicitors instructed West's detective agency to conduct surveillance of his second wife, June Tripp.

West was a councillor for the Municipal Reform Party from 1934 to 1937 in Central St Giles ward, London.

In 1939, West closed her detective agency and retired.

== Personal life ==
West married Harry Elliott in May 1901 and the couple had six children together. Elliott sometimes worked for his wife's detective agency and died in 1950.

== Death and legacy ==
West died on 13 March 1964. In 2019, she was the subject of a book length biography by Susannah Stapleton titled The Adventures of Maud West, Lady Detective: Secrets and Lies in the Golden Age of Crime. West also features in Sister Sleuths: Female Detectives in Britain by Nell Darby.

A photograph of West is held by Manchester Archives
