= The Skull Beneath the Skin =

1982 Cordelia Gray novel by P. D. James

The Skull Beneath The Skin
- First edition
- Author: P. D. James
- Language: English
- Series: Cordelia Gray #2
- Genre: Crime, mystery
- Publisher: Faber and Faber
- Publication date: 1982
- Publication place: United Kingdom
- Media type: Print (Hardcover, Paperback)
- Pages: 384
- ISBN: 0-571-11961-1
- OCLC: 59161851
- Preceded by: An Unsuitable Job for a Woman

The Skull Beneath The Skin is a 1982 detective novel by English writer P. D. James, featuring her female private detective Cordelia Gray. The novel is set in a reconstructed Victorian castle on the fictional Courcy Island on the Dorset coast and centers around actress Clarissa Lisle, who is to play John Webster's drama The Duchess of Malfi in the castle's restored theatre. It takes its title from T. S. Eliot's poem Whispers of Immortality, where Webster is famously said to be "much possessed by death" and to see "the skull beneath the skin".

== Plot summary ==
Cordelia Gray is engaged by Sir George Ralston, a baronet and World War II hero, to accompany his wife, the acclaimed actress Clarissa Lisle, for a weekend at Courcy Castle on the island of the same name on the Dorset coast. Clarissa has been receiving thinly veiled death threats in form of quotations from plays where she played the main role.

Shortly before the performance of The Duchess of Malfi, Clarissa is brutally murdered, leaving Cordelia and the Dorset CID to deal with solving the crime.

== Literary significance and criticism ==
Critics note that Cordelia's characterization shifts between An Unsuitable Job for a Woman and The Skull Beneath the Skin. Joan G. Kotker states the second novel creates "this image of Gray as a failure," where similar plot elements to the first novel "are treated in such a way as to cast doubt on the credibility of the initial event and of Gray's interpretation of it." Similarly, Nicola Nixon suggests that the sequel is intentionally structured like An Unsuitable Job for a Woman to "highlight various subtle adjustments to Cordelia - adjustments, I would suggest, that are designed primarily to quash readers' enthusiasm for her as a proto-feminist."

A Catalogue of Crime writes of the book: "Nothing is more disappointing than the poor work of a good craftsman. P. D. James, hailed as Christie's successor and in some ways an abler hand at characterization, has given steady proof of her mastery of the genre. She even created in Cordelia Gray a likable and credible woman investigator. Here she brings her back, but makes her act like a bewildered maiden, though she heads a London detective agency. Besides, the plot is full of unlikelihoods, including the reason for the island setting and the crime itself." -

In a 1982 book review, Julian Symons of The New York Times wrote "'The Skull Beneath the Skin' is perhaps an acknowledgment that she had reached too far, a deliberate step back in the direction of orthodoxy. It is a disappointment to the extent that the criminal results don't flow as they should from the stated motives, but this is still an absorbing story, paced and written with fine calculation, a work quite beyond the scope of more than a very few of her contemporaries."
