= Airs on a Shoestring =

Airs on a Shoestring was a British musical revue, first staged at the Royal Court Theatre in London on 22 April 1953.

Described as "an intimate revue", the show was devised and directed by Laurier Lister. Cast members included Max Adrian, Madeleine Dring, Moyra Fraser, Betty Marsden, and Denis Quilley. Musical numbers featured material by Michael Flanders and Donald Swann.

The show toured until March 1955, achieving a total of 772 performances.
