= Chris Petit =

English novelist and filmmaker

- Born: June 17, 1949 (age 77); Malvern, Worcestershire, England
- Occupations: Novelist; Film director
- Years active: 1980–present

Chris Petit (born 17 June 1949) is an English novelist and filmmaker. During the 1970s he was Film Editor for Time Out and wrote in Melody Maker. His first film was the cult British road movie Radio On, while his 1982 film An Unsuitable Job for a Woman was entered into the 32nd Berlin International Film Festival. His films often have a strong element of psychogeography, and he has worked frequently with the writer Iain Sinclair. He has also written a number of novels, including Robinson (1993).

== Fiction ==
=== Robinson ===
Robinson (1993) is a novel about a man initially working in London's Soho in a job vaguely connected with the film industry, who meets the enigmatic title character and becomes involved in alcoholic excess and pornographic film production. It was Petit's first novel coming from his earlier career as a filmmaker. Nicholas Lezard compares it to JG Ballard and Patrick Hamilton. Merlin Coverley notes that the character Cookie indicates a debt to London low-life writer Robin Cook (aka Derek Raymond). There is some confusion over the lead character's name, which appears to relate to a mysterious figure in Céline's Journey to the End of the Night, inspired by Robinson Crusoe; it was released around the same time as the first film of Patrick Keiller's Robinson trilogy, which Keiller claimed took the name from Kafka's Amerika but others, such as Iain Sinclair, have related to Céline and indirectly to Petit.

Initial reviews were muted: reviewing it in 1993, Lezard felt it would work better as a film than a novel. Publishers Weekly called it "mostly a mood piece" and "nothing more than atmospherics". More recently, its reputation has improved: The Quietus called it a "classic".

=== The Psalm Killer ===
The Psalm Killer (1997) is a crime thriller set in the Northern Irish Troubles. It combines the stories of "Candlestick", a hired killer working for both sides, with Inspector Cross, a policeman investigating a series of murders. Kirkus called it "formulaic" and "relentlessly depressing", comparing it to a more miserable version of John le Carré. In contrast, Booklist called it an "engrossing, superbly written tale".

=== The Human Pool ===
The Human Pool (2002) is a thriller, about neo-nazis in contemporary Frankfurt and espionage in World War II Switzerland. The Guardian criticised it for "lacking in sense of place" and "dispiriting banality".

=== Bibliography ===
- 1993 Robinson (Granta Books)
- 1997 The Psalm Killer
- 1999 Back from the Dead
- 2001 The Hard Shoulder
- 2002 The Human Pool
- 2006 The Passenger
- 2016 The Butchers of Berlin
- 2017 Pale Horse Riding
- 2019 Mister Wolf
- 2022 Ghost Country
- 2025 Come in and Shut the Door

== Filmography ==
- Radio On (1979)
- An Unsuitable Job for a Woman (1982)
- Flight to Berlin (1983)
- Chinese Boxes (1984)
- A Caribbean Mystery (TV) (1989)
- The Cardinal and the Corpse (with Iain Sinclair) (1992)
- Surveillance (1993)
- The Falconer (with Iain Sinclair) (1997)
- Radio On Remix (1998)
- Negative Space (1999)
- Asylum (with Iain Sinclair) (2000)
- The Carfax Agreement: The Annotated Dracula
- London Orbital (with Iain Sinclair) (2002)
- Unrequited Love (2006)
- Content (2010)
- D is for Distance (2025)
