= Pippa Guard =

British actress (born 1952)

- Born: Philippa Ann Guard; 13 October 1952 (age 74); Edinburgh, Scotland
- Education: University of Montreal; Royal Academy of Dramatic Art
- Occupation: Actress
- Years active: 1976–present
- Spouse: Steve Goldie (m. 1981)
- Children: 1
- Family: Christopher Guard (cousin); Dominic Guard (cousin)

Philippa Ann Guard (born 13 October 1952) is a British actress known for her work on stage and television during the late 1970s and 1980s. After joining the Royal Shakespeare Company in 1976, she gained early recognition for her performances in classical roles, including Juliet in Romeo and Juliet and Hermia in A Midsummer Night’s Dream. Guard became more widely recognised for her television work, notably in the BBC adaptation of The Mill on the Floss (1978), Granada’s The Mallens (1979), and The Country Diary of an Edwardian Lady (1984). She also appeared in adaptations of major literary works, such as Virginia Woolf’s To the Lighthouse (1982), P. D. James’ An Unsuitable Job for a Woman (1981), and several productions for the BBC Television Shakespeare.

== Biography ==
Guard joined the Royal Shakespeare Company in 1976, and first attracted attention when she took over the role of Juliet from a sick Francesca Annis. She played Hermia in John Barton's 1977 production of A Midsummer Night's Dream, Luciana in Trevor Nunn's musical Comedy of Errors and Evie in Factory Birds. As The Stratfordians notes, Guard appeared destined for a classical stage career but she has become best known as a television actress.

In 1978 Guard left the RSC and won the role of Maggie Tulliver in a BBC serialisation of The Mill on the Floss (1978), followed by Barbara Mallen in The Mallens (Granada 1979), Maria in Maria Marten (BBC, 1980), Prue in To the Lighthouse (BBC, 1982) and three roles for the BBC Television Shakespeare: Miranda in The Tempest (1979), Diana in All's Well that Ends Well (1980) and, once again, Hermia in A Midsummer Night's Dream (1981). (On BBC Radio, she also played Tess in Tess of the d'Urbervilles in 1982 and Bella Wilfer in Our Mutual Friend in 1984). However, her stated desire for more contemporary and diverse roles was evident in her portrayal of a 22nd-century woman in the Play for Today The Flipside of Dominick Hide (1980) and its sequel Another Flip for Dominick (1982). She also portrayed P. D. James' sleuth Cordelia Gray in an adaptation of An Unsuitable Job for a Woman (1981), her only film role.

In 1984, Guard played Edith Holden in a twelve-part adaptation of The Country Diary of an Edwardian Lady (Central). This drama attracted a peak audience of 13 million viewers and raised Guard's public profile considerably, but it effectively marked the end of the first phase of her television career. In 1981 she had married the BBC production manager and director Steve Goldie and in July 1984 she gave birth to their daughter Sama. She did not return to television until 1986, although she focussed on her stage career in the meantime, playing Antigone at the National Theatre (1983) and Faye in A Chorus of Disapproval in the West End (1986). In 1986, she played an abusive mother in A Couple of Charlies (Central) and an abused wife in The Life and Loves of a She-Devil (BBC).

She then returned to the Royal Shakespeare Company in 1987, where her roles included Maria in Twelfth Night, Nerissa in The Merchant of Venice, Natasha in Three Sisters, Caresse Crosby in Divine Gossip (Barbican, 1988) and Katherine in The Strange Case of Dr Jekyll and Mr Hyde (Barbican, 1991). Her first major project was the sitcom Close to Home, with Paul Nicholas (LWT, 1990), followed by two series of the comedy-drama The Riff Raff Element (BBC, 1993–94), All or Nothing at All with Hugh Laurie (LWT, 1993), India Wilkes in Scarlett (1994), John Sullivan's Roger Roger (BBC, 1998-2000), Hope and Glory with Lenny Henry (BBC, 1999), Hearts and Bones (BBC, 2000) and two series of The Creatives (1998-2000).

In 1998, she graduated with a first-class degree in English and drama from the University of Greenwich. After gaining an MPhil from Royal Holloway, University of London, she gained a PhD in 2005 on early modern drama from the same institution. Guard now works as a lecturer and drama programme leader at the University of Greenwich, her published research includes "A Defence of the First English Actress", and she appeared on BBC Radio 4's Woman's Hour to discuss Shakespeare's women.

== Personal life ==
Guard is married to production manager Steve Goldie, with whom she has one daughter. Her cousins are fellow actors Christopher and Dominic Guard. Her uncle Philip and younger brother Alex Guard were also actors.

Her parents were Robin and Barbara Guard. Robin after his retirement from the field of Engineering, began to study the humanities at Brock University becoming its eldest graduate at the age of 95.
