= An Unsuitable Job for a Woman (TV series) =

- Genre: Mystery
- Based on: An Unsuitable Job for a Woman by P.D. James
- Directed by: Ben Bolt; John Strickland; David Evans; Mary McMurray
- Starring: Helen Baxendale; Annette Crosbie; Rosemary Leach; Struan Rodger
- Composer: Colin Towns
- Country of origin: United Kingdom
- Original language: English
- No. of series: 2
- No. of episodes: 10

Production
- Executive producers: Rebecca Eaton; Stephen Matthews; Douglas Rae
- Producers: Colin Ludlow; Debbie Shewell
- Cinematography: Dick Dodd
- Editor: David Head
- Running time: 60 minutes (UK; 1997–1998); 120 minutes (UK; 1999–2001)
- Production companies: Ecosse Films; WGBH Boston; HTV

Original release
- Network: ITV
- Release: 24 October 1997 – 16 May 2001

An Unsuitable Job for a Woman is a British television mystery drama series, based upon the 1972 novel of the same name by P.D. James, that starred Helen Baxendale and Annette Crosbie. Two series were produced, each focusing on two separate feature-length dramas, each based in part upon the book of the same name and its 1982 sequel, The Skull Beneath the Skin. These aired on ITV between 24 October 1997 and 16 May 2001, also airing in the United States on PBS as part of their Mystery! series.

Baxendale stars as Cordelia Gray, a young, aspiring private detective learning the ropes from her mentor, disgraced ex-policeman Bernie Pryde (Jeff Nuttall). But when Pryde's sudden suicide leaves Cordelia the sole proprietor of his ramshackle agency, she is forced to continue her education on the job. With only Mrs Sparshott (Annette Crosbie), the agency's longtime secretary and her new assistant on the team, Cordelia finds herself thrust headfirst into unfamiliar waters. The complete series was released on DVD in the United States on 8 January 2008.

== Cast ==
- Helen Baxendale as Cordelia Gray
- Annette Crosbie as Edith Sparshott
- Rosemary Leach as Miss Markland
- Struan Rodger as DCS Fergusson
- Ian McDiarmid as Ronald Callender

== Episodes ==
=== Series 1 (1997–1998) ===
No. in series	Title	Directed by	Written by	British air date	UK viewers (million)
1	"Sacrifice: Part 1"	Ben Bolt	William Humble	24 October 1997; 23 April 1998 (PBS)	N/A
Guest cast: Ian McDiarmid as Ronald Callender; Phyllis Logan as Elizabeth Leaming; Jeff Nuttall as Bernie Pryde; Frank Middlemass as Mr. Markland; Rosemary Leach as Miss Markland; Mark Heap as Det. Sgt. Marskell; Cordelia Gray inherits the detective agency she works for, after the death of her boss. Her first case comes when she is hired by Ronald Callender, an eminent scientist, to investigate why his son, Cambridge University student Mark Callender, has committed suicide. She soon discovers the case is more dangerous and complex than it at first appeared.
2	"Sacrifice: Part 2"	Ben Bolt	William Humble	31 October 1997; 30 April 1998 (PBS)	N/A
Cordelia moves into the summer house where Mark Callender was found hanged, and finds herself threatened. Mark's friends also seem determined to deflect her investigation into his suicide. Cordelia then discovers that Ronald stands to benefit from his son's death.
3	"Sacrifice: Part 3"	Ben Bolt	William Humble	7 November 1997; 7 May 1998 (PBS)	N/A
Cordelia uncovers the mysterious circumstances relating to the discovery of Mark's body. As she gets closer to the truth, there is a further twist as the investigation ends in nightmarish fashion.
4	"A Last Embrace: Part 1"	John Strickland	William Humble	19 February 1998; 14 May 1998 (PBS)	N/A
Guest cast: Gemma Jones as Julia Hampson; Leigh Lawson as Andrew Hampson; Julian Rhind-Tutt as Philip Hampson; Andrew Bicknell as Peter Forbes; Mark Dexter as Barry Forbes; Matilda Ziegler as Hilary Hampson; Cordelia goes undercover as a holiday relief at the Claircourt Park Hotel when the proprietor is accused by his wife of sexually harassing female staff. But when she arrives, the woman has disappeared.
5	"A Last Embrace: Part 2"	John Strickland	William Humble	26 February 1998; 21 May 1998 (PBS)	N/A
Cordelia is upset and unsure whom to trust after events at the hotel. The Hampson family is thrown into discord when a murderer strikes.
6	"A Last Embrace: Part 3"	John Strickland	William Humble	5 March 1998; 28 May 1998 (PBS)	N/A
Cordelia finds herself conflicted as her investigation moves towards a conclusion.

=== Series 2 (1999) ===
No. in series	Title	Directed by	Written by	British air date	UK viewers (million)
1	"Living on Risk: Part 1"	David Evans	Christopher Russell	27 August 1999; 14 October 1999 (PBS)	6.31
Guest cast: Gwyneth Strong as Det. Insp. Richards; Steve John Shepherd as Lee; Craig Fairbrass as Jason; James Hiller as Dave Crawford; With the agency struggling, and now pregnant, Cordelia welcomes a seemingly straightforward job. But is the man she is hired to follow a killer or a victim?
2	"Living on Risk: Part 2"	David Evans	Christopher Russell	27 August 1999; 21 October 1999 (PBS)	6.31
Cordelia discovers she may have been hired to help commit a crime, not prevent to one.
3	"Playing God: Part 1"	Mary McMurray	Barbara Machin	28 October 1999 (PBS); 16 May 2001 (ITV)	6.57
Guest cast: Flora Montgomery as Laura Fergusson; Anna Madeley as Petra; Gerard Butler as Tim Bolton; Jack Ellis as Stephen Childs; Catherine Russell as Caroline Childs; David Harewood as Det. Insp. Peterson; Colin Tierney as Det. Sgt. Clacey; John Bowler as Det. Const. Wilton; Now heavily pregnant, and facing an uncertain future, Cordelia accepts a job from her an adversary, DCS Fergusson, who hires her to spy on his daughter's boyfriend, Tim Bolton, but then abruptly breaks the job off.
4	"Playing God: Part 2"	Mary McMurray	Barbara Machin	4 November 1999 (PBS); 16 May 2001 (ITV)	6.57
Cordelia is hired by Tim's daughter, Laura, to resume the investigation.
