= Pond Life (TV series) =

- Also known as: I Want a Boyfriend ... Or Do I? (Pilot title)
- Genre: Comedy; Animation
- Created by: Candy Guard
- Written by: Candy Guard
- Directed by: Candy Guard
- Voices of: Sarah Ann Kennedy; Emma Chambers; John Thomson; Charlotte Mitchell; Brian Murphy; Cleo Harrington; Mark Ashby; Maria Manton
- Country of origin: United Kingdom
- Original language: English
- No. of seasons: 2
- No. of episodes: 20

Production
- Executive producers: Trevor Murphy; Christopher O'Hare (season 2)
- Producers: Edward Bignell; Tony Collingwood (season 2)
- Animator: Candy Guard
- Running time: 11 minutes (season 1); 20 minutes (season 2)
- Production companies: Pond Life Productions (s1); Collingwood O'Hare Entertainment (s2); EVA Entertainment

Original release
- Network: Channel 4
- Release: 1996 – 2000

Pond Life is a British adult animated television series that aired on Channel 4 for two series in 1996 and 2000. The series was created, written, animated produced and directed by comedian and animator Candy Guard and follows the misadventures of its neurotic and self-obsessed protagonist, Dolly Pond. It was produced by EVA Entertainment, with Pond Life Productions for the first series and Collingwood O'Hare Productions for the second series.

The series began life in 1992 with a pilot episode entitled I Want a Boyfriend ... Or Do I? which was co-commissioned by Channel 4 and S4C. Channel 4 later commissioned Pond Life by the channel's self in 1996.

Pond Life was Guard's second breakthrough, but scheduling problems marred the series' reception; it was originally intended for broadcast at 9.45pm, but was shown four hours earlier, which required edits to remove adult language. It was shown at the same time as Australian soap Neighbours, and was aimed at the same core audience as the soap. Despite these problems, Pond Life won several awards and received a Writer's Guild nomination for Best Sitcom. Guard was pleased because it was up against several live-action comedy series, including Only Fools and Horses.

Although Pond Life is a traditional hand-drawn cartoon, the comedy series was directed at adult audiences and specifically targeted at female viewers.

== Characters ==
- Dolly Pond – Voiced by Sarah Ann Kennedy. Dolly is a self-centred, somewhat whiny 30-something woman who lives alone in the flat above the shop she works in. She has lived in the same cul-de-sac all her life, which is an almost perfect metaphor for the 'dead end' life she sees herself trapped in. Dolly is convinced she deserves a better job, more exciting friends and a generally more glamorous lifestyle, but her attempts to obtain these always fall flat or end in disaster. Dolly also has a tendency to want things simply because she can't have them; for example, convincing herself she is pregnant after learning her rival Gloria Leaf is trying for a baby, despite not having had sex in months.
- Belle Stickleback – Voiced by Emma Chambers. Dolly's best friend, whom she has known since school. She seems to be more down-to-earth and sensible than Dolly (although Dolly describes her as 'laid-back and silly' to her mother). Dolly is definitely the dominant half of the partnership, which often frustrates Belle, and the two have their fair share of falling-outs because of it; however, they usually make up soon enough, largely because Belle is too lethargic to break the pattern. Belle is overweight and very sensitive about it (something the tactless Dolly usually fails to consider) and is keen to find a steady boyfriend.
- Nobby – Voiced by John Thomson. Dolly's ex-boyfriend, who lives in the flat upstairs. Despite the fact that Dolly usually treats him with disdain, he spends most of his time trying to win her back. When on one occasion Nobby finally gives up and starts a relationship with Belle's sister, Kelly, Dolly decides she can't live without him and goes all-out to win him back; however, once she succeeds she soon becomes disappointed with the reality of it. In spite of Dolly's frequent attempts to put Nobby off the two still spend a lot of time together, probably due to a lack of alternatives.
- Edna Allwright ('Mrs A.') – Voiced by Thomson. An 85-year-old, single Welsh woman who owns the shop that Dolly works in, known to all as Mrs A. She is a long-term family friend of the Ponds, has a dog named Perky and, as revealed in the episode "Addict", has been smoking since she was eight. Mrs A seems to have little idea of how to run a business, taking twenty years to realise a shop at the end of a cul-de-sac doesn't get any passing trade. Mrs A's surname symbolises her humdrum life, and what Dolly fears hers will become (something Gloria Leaf picks up on when she tells Dolly 'If you're not careful you'll be turning into Mrs Allwright').
- Len and Ivy Pond – Voiced by Charlotte Mitchell (mother of Candy Guard) and Brian Murphy. Dolly's parents, who tend to still treat her like a child; something which frustrates her, but that she is not afraid to take advantage of when it suits. They don't understand Dolly's frustration with life and encourage her to settle down with Nobby.
- Alan and Alana – Voiced by Cleo Harrington and Mark Ashby. Dolly's older sister and brother-in-law. They are happily married with two children, in contrast to the miserable Dolly, who they often treat as an object of pity.
- Tad and Poll – Both Voiced by Maria Manton. Alan and Alana's (presumably) twin children, usually dismissed as 'brats' by Dolly.
- Gloria Leaf – Voiced by Harrington. An old school 'friend' of Dolly's, who appears to have everything Dolly doesn't – a glamorous job as a model, a well-off steady boyfriend etc. However, she still lives in the cul-de-sac despite her more affluent lifestyle. She is usually overtly friendly to Dolly, but usually manages to make a sly dig at her in most of their conversations (or at least show off how well she is doing by comparison).
- Kelly Stickleback – Voiced by Manton. Belle’s younger sister who makes her debut in "Commuting" in a non-speaking cameo, but returns in "Mr. Wrong" when she becomes the girlfriend of Nobby.

== Episodes ==
Series 1

Boyfriend – Dolly bumps into an old friend from school, Sid, and the two get along well. However, when Belle points out that Sid fancies Dolly, she becomes incredibly nervous and makes a mess of things. Dolly then becomes obsessed with the idea of a relationship with Sid.

Holiday – Dolly persuades Belle to go on holiday to Greece; but while Dolly wants a cultural trip, Belle just wants to sunbathe and enjoy nights out. When Belle has a holiday romance with a Greek barman, she and Dolly decide to enjoy the holiday separately – but neither gets what she was hoping for.

Bitter and Twisted – Struggling with a bad back and depression, Dolly sees both an osteopath and a counsellor. While Dolly is very keen on her handsome Australian osteopath Keith, counsellor Ruth seems to need help more than Dolly does. Dolly's feelings for Keith don't appear to be reciprocated, but she's shocked to discover she does have an admirer amongst her therapists after all...

Birthday Suit – Dolly and mum Ivy go off to buy an outfit. Will it be fun and gossip or heated fashion disputes in the communal changing rooms.

Success – Jealous to learn Gloria Leaf has a bit part in a film, Dolly goes for a shot at fame herself by entering a poetry competition. "Clouds", which she wrote aged 11, wins the local heat, but Dolly panics when she realises she has to write a second poem to perform at the final. Then, on the night of the final, there's a shock in store when Dolly meets her fellow poets.

Fit – Belle organises a day of relaxation for the ever-stressed Dolly, but she simply doesn't know how to switch off – and ends up stressing everyone else out in the process.

Commuting – Dolly gives up working in Mrs A's when she gets a new job in Birmingham, but her family are sceptical about her plan to commute daily. When Dolly has to deal with busy Tubes, delayed trains and irritating fellow passengers – not to mention rogue livestock – it seems they might be right.

Glastonbury – Dolly persuades Belle and Nobby to join her at Glastonbury, but struggles putting the tent up and finding their way around means they barely get to see any performances. However, they do manage to get into the festival vibe in one sense, when experimenting with drugs leads to some surprising results.

Get on Downer – Lacking excitement in her social life, Dolly plans to throw a party – but after mentally crossing Belle, Nobby and her family off the guest list, realises she doesn't really know anyone else. In desperation Dolly encourages Gloria Leaf to invite her friends, but soon finds her new guests aren't as exciting as she'd hoped.

Driving Test – After 60 seconds sleep and a bout of diarrhoea, Dolly is more than ready for her driving test.

Flatmate – Monica Duprey, an old friend of Dolly's is homeless and harmless so Dolly offers her a room. Meet the bathroom-hogging, note-leaving, food-labelling flatmate from hell.

Mr Wrong – When Nobby's latest attempt to win Dolly back fails, he finally gives up and begins dating Belle's sister Kelly instead. Dolly soon becomes jealous and regrets ditching Nobby, going all out to win him back – but soon realises she only wanted what she couldn't have.

Series Two

Pet – After watching a Pet Rescue-style show, Dolly becomes obsessed with the idea of saving a cute animal from the show – but is disappointed to be offered a rare 'Dracula hamster'. When Mrs A gives away Perky's puppies (because they're not pedigree), Dolly sees her chance to rescue a more photogenic animal. Unfortunately little puppy Sprout quickly grows huge and unmanageable, and Dolly begins to regret taking on either pet – with her attempts to appear compassionate on TV failing miserably.

Fat – Dolly returns from a trip to Australia having gained huge amounts of weight – but she doesn't seem to have noticed. After Belle finally plucks up the courage to tell her, Dolly tries, and fails at, a number of fad diets. Meanwhile Belle has joined a dating agency in the hope of finding a man not obsessed with slim women – but her date Ray soon has a bigger woman in his sights...

Falling Out – Dolly is furious when Belle stretches her newly knitted jumper. However, she soon spots an opportunity to use her skills when she applies for a job at a new knitwear boutique – unaware Belle also wanted the job. The pair soon fall out, both blaming the other. Belle tries to replace Dolly by befriending Gloria Leaf, while Dolly pals up with boutique manager Sonia, but both soon prove fair-weather friends.

Addict – After Mrs A nearly burns down her flat when she falls asleep whilst smoking, Dolly decides it's time to give up. However, nicotine patches, hypnosis and even expensive rehab fail to do the trick. When she meets handsome health freak Terry, Dolly finally finds the motivation she needs – but does she love him more than she loves cigarettes?

Good Looking Boyfriend – Dolly feels lonely when Belle gets a new boyfriend, so decides to pursue Didier, Nobby's handsome night school teacher. She can't believe her luck when she bags a date, but soon realises why Didier is single – he's incredibly dull. Trying to force herself into feeling happy, Dolly pushes Didier into marriage, but as the wedding day looms, Dolly realises looks really aren't everything.

Christmas – Having promised herself she will for several years, Dolly decides this is the Christmas when she really will go travelling instead of staying at home with the family. However, when the reality sets in Dolly realises she's scared of going around the world on her own – but doesn't feel like she can pull out either. Meanwhile, Ivy is on the verge of a nervous breakdown as she tries to plan the perfect Christmas, leaving the rest of the family envious that Dolly gets to escape – or does she?

Family Futures – Dolly and Belle both apply to appear on their favourite quiz show – but thanks to an eyepatch and an epileptic cat, Dolly is forced to draft in Nobby and Mrs A as emergency family members. Against the odds, the Ponds reach the final, but a surprise appearance from the real Granny Pond soon derails things.

== Broadcast ==
=== Original broadcast ===
Two series were broadcast on Channel 4 in 1996 and 2000. The first series had 13x11minute episodes and was screened from 3 to 18 December 1996 — mainly at 5.45pm —; two of these 13 episodes explored more adult themes and therefore were reserved for a double screening at 11.25pm. This series was repeated between March and June 1998.

A second series of 7x30minute episodes followed between 19–30 September 2000 to tie-in with Channel 4's Animation Week of 23–29 September 2000.

=== International broadcast ===
Teletoon aired the series in Canada starting in 1997. It also aired on Locomotion in Latin America.

== Home release ==
One VHS tape of Pond Life was released with seven episodes including Boyfriend, Glastonbury, Holiday, Get On Downer, P.M.T, Driving Test, Birthday Suit. Pond Life was only ever released on DVD in Australia, although these discs are long out of print. All episodes are available on Candy Guard's website.
