= Thrones, Dominations =

Novel by Dorothy L. Sayers and Jill Paton Walsh

- First edition
- Author: Dorothy L. Sayers also Jill Paton Walsh
- Language: English
- Series: Lord Peter Wimsey
- Genre: Mystery novel
- Publisher: Hodder & Stoughton
- Publication date: 1998
- Publication place: United Kingdom
- Media type: Print (hardback & paperback)
- Pages: 312 pp
- ISBN: 0-340-68455-0
- OCLC: 247103826
- Preceded by: Busman's Honeymoon
- Followed by: A Presumption of Death

Thrones, Dominations is a Lord Peter Wimsey–Harriet Vane murder mystery novel that Dorothy L. Sayers began writing but abandoned, and which remained at her death as fragments and notes. It was completed by Jill Paton Walsh and published in 1998. The title is a quotation from John Milton's Paradise Lost and refers to two categories of angel in the Christian angelic hierarchy.

== Background ==
Sayers had charted the developing relationship between Lord Peter Wimsey and Harriet Vane over four published novels, culminating in Busman's Honeymoon, the action of which takes place immediately following the couple's wedding. The characters appeared thereafter only in a few short stories and other published pieces, revealing only glimpses of their married life. According to Sayers' friend and biographer Barbara Reynolds, Sayers had begun work in 1936 on Thrones, Dominations, a murder mystery novel in which the Wimsey marriage was to be contrasted with those of two other couples.

She apparently worked on it for some months during 1936, but does not appear to have done so thereafter; it has been suggested that this is due at least in part to the constitutional crisis of that year surrounding Edward VIII and his relationship with Wallis Simpson.

The events of December 1936 onwards overtook the story, with the abdication altering how Sayers' potential audience would interpret a tale of contrasting marriages. In 1938, she declared in a letter that she had come to dislike the book, and had "great difficulty doing anything about it".

Sayers' notes for the work were found among her papers after her death in 1957, and were acquired in 1976 by the Wade Center at Wheaton College, Illinois. They consisted of a number of complete scenes from the beginning of the story and a few diagrams, including a multi-coloured representation of the interactions of the characters. By 1985 there were plans to publish the manuscript as it stood, together with some of the other short Wimsey pieces, both published and unpublished, but these failed due to the death of Sayers' son and heir Anthony Fleming in that year. In 1996 the literary trustees of the estate approached novelist Jill Paton Walsh and asked her to look at the material with a view to completing the novel. She was also able to refer to a typescript which had been found in a safe at Sayers' former literary agents and which differed in some respects from the manuscript version.

The scenes were not ordered or numbered, and had to be arranged in logical order by Paton Walsh to constitute the first six chapters of the book. The remainder of the story had to be constructed from almost no data, based on what had already been written, but Paton Walsh has said that Sayers' notes make it clear who the murderer would be. The book was published in February 1998. Jill Paton Walsh followed it in 2002 with another Wimsey/Vane novel, A Presumption of Death, set during World War II and based on some short wartime writings of Sayers known as "The Wimsey Papers".

== Plot summary ==
In 1936, Lord and Lady Peter Wimsey, returning from a European honeymoon, are settling into their new home in London, where daily life is affected by the illness and then death of the king. The couple are personally happy, having resolved many of the problems in their relationship caused by character and circumstance, but must now tackle the practical details of bringing their lives together, including domestic and working arrangements, and social and family obligations.

The couple become slightly acquainted with Laurence Harwell, a wealthy theatrical "angel", and his beautiful wife, whom he has rescued from poverty following her rich father's disgrace and imprisonment. After two years' marriage the Harwells are famously still devoted to one another, and when she is found dead at their weekend cottage in the country Wimsey is asked to help interview the distraught husband, and becomes involved with the investigation. (He is also asked to undertake sensitive diplomatic duties connected with the problematic behaviour of the new king, and as the 1936 abdication crisis looms, he gloomily predicts the coming war with Hitler's Germany.)

Suspicion falls on a writer known to have been in love with Mrs Harwell, and a talented but bohemian painter who had been working on portraits of both Harriet and the murdered woman. Two men who knew Mrs Harwell's father in prison, and who have been blackmailing him with threats to harm her, are also suspected.

Meanwhile, Harriet straightens out her domestic situation, learning how to fulfill her new role whilst keeping her own identity, and finds a practical solution to allow Wimsey's devoted manservant Bunter to marry without having to leave the household. Harriet's unorthodox approach infuriates her sister-in-law (who believes Harriet has an obligation to abandon her career, do her duty to the family and produce an heir) but it allows her to solve most of the practical difficulties that might have stood in the way of a successful and happy marriage. She also discovers she is expecting a baby.

After some plot twists, a second murder and a scene involving the hidden rivers and Victorian sewers that run under London, it is revealed that Harwell unintentionally killed his wife in a jealous rage, in the belief she was preparing to entertain a lover, although ironically her preparations had really been for him. Harwell might have gotten off with a manslaughter conviction, except that he later committed the premeditated murder of an actress who was in a position to disprove his alibi and tried to blackmail him. Harriet visits Harwell in prison to comfort him with the knowledge that his wife had not, after all, been unfaithful. In doing so, she finally banishes the lingering ghosts of her own imprisonment and murder trial, and the effect they have had on her relationship with her own husband.

== Characters ==
- Lord Peter Wimsey – Aristocratic amateur detective in his mid-forties. The younger son of a duke, his wealth comes largely from property which he manages with intelligence and responsibility.
- Lady Peter Wimsey (née Harriet Vane) – Successful detective novelist in her early thirties, newly married to Lord Peter after a stormy courtship. Was saved from the gallows by her husband when accused of the murder of a former lover.
- Laurence Harwell – Independently wealthy investor in plays. Married for approximately two years, indulgent of his wife and deeply in love.
- Rosamund Harwell – Daughter of a wealthy man, reduced to humiliating poverty and employment as a mannequin after her father's imprisonment for fraud. Rescued by her marriage to Harwell two years previously – deeply in love, but given to friendly relations with other men and bored because she has little to occupy her days. Strikingly beautiful.
- Mr Warren – Rosamund Harwell's father, once wealthy but now dependent on his daughter and son-in-law after becoming involved in fraudulent transactions and ending up penniless and in prison. Damaged by his experiences, proud of his daughter and grateful to Harwell.
- Claude Amery – Talented writer and promising playwright. Passionately in love with Rosamund Harwell, and very jealous of her husband, who offered to stage his first play.
- Gaston Chaparelle – Society portrait painter. Talented artist but an amoral man in the habit of seducing his female sitters.
- Mervyn Bunter – Wimsey's manservant for over 16 years. Devoted and loyal, but in love and wishing to marry.
- Hope Fanshaw – Portrait photographer with her own business. Object of Bunter's affections.
- Gloria Tallant (née Phoebe Sugden) – Young actress of small talent but great ambition. Acquainted with Harwell, and her family home is close to the Harwells' country cottage.
- Duke and Duchess of Denver – Wimsey's older brother Gerald and sister-in-law Helen. She has traditional views on class and rank and disapproves of the Wimsey marriage, particularly Harriet's attitude to work and children. He is dutiful but unimaginative and in awe of his clever brother, but inclined to like Harriet. Both increasingly worried by their only son and heir Jerry (styled as Lord St. George), who is charming but spoiled and unreliable, and hope the Wimseys will produce children to ensure the succession of the family lands and estates beyond doubt.
- Honoria, Dowager Duchess of Denver – Wimsey's witty mother who is very pleased with his choice of wife and becomes a friend of Harriet's; some parts of the novel are presented in the form of humorous letters and diary entries of hers
- Chief Inspector Charles Parker – Police officer in charge of the Harwell murder case. Wimsey's brother-in-law and close friend.

== Reception ==
The book attracted considerable media interest, and met with mixed reviews from a variety of high-profile critics. Novelist Ruth Rendell, writing in the Sunday Times, declared it "...impossible to tell where Dorothy L. Sayers ends and Jill Paton Walsh begins".

A. N. Wilson agreed that the joins in the material appeared "seamless" to the amateur reader, but found the plot in the main "rather feeble"; he noted Paton Walsh's attempt to parody Sayers' style, "...the really corking snobbery, the sub-Wodehousian banter, and the conceited swapping of obvious quotations", but judged it a failure.

Joyce Carol Oates in The New York Times called the book "engrossing, intelligent and provocative", praised the power of its descriptive passages, and found its darker tone more in keeping with the later Wimsey novels than with the "zest and flashy originality" of the earlier ones.

Reviewer Barbara Fowler noted that

"The original Wimsey books were contemporary novels, reflecting social and political situations and outlooks at the time of writing. The present book, except for its beginning, is a historical novel – specifically, a historical detective book – carefully reconstructing a historical past time with a lot of hindsight. ... King Edward VIII is seen here from a clearly post-WWII perspective, with a reference made to his meeting Nazi agents and with Wimsey flatly stating that he is not fit to be King. It is extremely unlikely that Sayers, had she completed the book at the time itself, would have written anything of the kind, or that her publishers would have risked scandal by unleashing such a book upon the British public; at the time, it often happened that British papers delicately avoided altogether any mention of the mess in which their King was becoming involved".
