= Lord Peter Views the Body =

1928 short story collection by Dorothy Sayers

- 1939 edition (publ. Gollancz)
- Author: Dorothy L. Sayers
- Language: English
- Publication date: 1928

Lord Peter Views the Body, first published in 1928, is the first collection of short stories about Lord Peter Wimsey by Dorothy L. Sayers. Some stories, starting with “The Problem of Uncle Meleager’s Will,” had been previously published. All twelve stories were included in later complete collections.

== Synopsis ==
=== The Abominable History of the Man with Copper Fingers ===
Members of London's "Egotists' Club" are telling stories of mysterious, unsolved happenings. One of the members' guests, a cinema actor named Varden, tells how he was invited to model for a wealthy sculptor, Eric Loder, and spent several months at Loder's New York mansion. After the war, Loder invited Varden to return to New York for another sitting. Varden noticed that Loder's mistress, Maria Morano, had disappeared, though a life-size silver-plated sculpture of her now occupied the living room. One night, Varden was wakened and told to flee for his life by a "funny-looking" monocled man. This man then smashed the arm of the statue with a fireplace poker, showing Varden a human arm bone inside. Varden fled the house immediately, but afterwards wondered if it was all a practical joke.

The "funny-looking man" – Wimsey, also a member of the club – appears and explains the mystery. Wimsey himself was a guest in Loder's mansion some weeks before Varden's arrival. A burst water bottle led him to abandon his bed for the living room sofa; there, he secretly witnessed Loder enter a hidden workshop behind a bookcase. After Loder left, Wimsey investigated and discovered an electroplating apparatus, as well as evidence that Loder had killed and electroplated Maria, and intended to do the same to Varden when he arrived. Loder had believed (incorrectly) that Varden and Maria were having an affair.

After frightening Varden away, Wimsey confronted Loder in the workshop. Loder tried to turn off the lights and attack Wimsey, but tripped and fell into the plating apparatus' cyanide tank, dying instantly. In trying to turn on the lights, Wimsey accidentally turned on the apparatus, causing Loder's hands to be electroplated in copper. Loder's death was ruled an accident, and Wimsey and Bunter gave the statue of Maria a Christian burial with the help of a sympathetic priest.

=== The Entertaining Episode of the Article in Question ===
Peter and Bunter are queueing at Gare Saint-Lazare in Paris, when Peter overhears a conversation from a young woman in the queue that makes him curious, particularly when he notes that the woman and her companion are travelling to Dover. After patient investigation, Peter meets with his mother's friend, the Dowager Duchess of Medway, and through conversation learns that a highly valuable diamond necklace will be taken out of the family vault for her granddaughter's forthcoming wedding. He asks for and is granted an invitation to the wedding.

Arriving at the wedding, Wimsey finds Detective Inspector Charles Parker among the police presence there to protect the diamonds. A brief uproar arises when the bride discovers that the necklace is stolen. The thieves have already been caught, however, due to Peter's information, and he shocks the assembled wedding party by exposing the Dowager Duchess's French lady's maid as Monsieur Jacques le Rouge, alias "Jacques Sans-culotte", a notorious safecracker, thief, and female impersonator. Jacques cheerfully confesses, asking Peter how he knew. Peter explains that, while queueing at Saint-Lazare, he overheard Jacques in feminine dress refer to himself by the masculine article un instead of the feminine une. Jacques congratulates Peter for such a mastery of the French language, unique among English people. The Dowager Duchess is initially outraged that Peter knowingly allowed her to be dressed, undressed, and assisted to bed by a man, but when he apologizes she laughs it off, saying that not many women of her age can boast of such a thing.

=== The Fascinating Problem of Uncle Meleager's Will ===
This is the first published Lord Peter story; it was originally published in Pearson's Magazine vol. 60, July 1925, pp. 27–35. The version of the story published in Lord Peter Views the Body, however, was altered to set it after the most recent novel — when Mary mentions the Soviet Club, Peter refers to the events that happen there in Clouds of Witness.

When old Meleager Finch dies, he leaves two wills: the first grants his fortune to the conservative Primrose League, while the second leaves everything to his niece, Hannah, a young, serious socialist. He writes a letter to Hannah explaining that this second will has been hidden somewhere, and that her only chance of finding it is "by the exercise of a sustained frivolity."

Lord Peter, his sister Mary, and his valet Bunter travel with Hannah to help her find the missing will. They discover that Meleager was a crossword puzzle fiend, and find a trove of puzzles he had written, including one with no accompanying grid. When Peter falls into the impluvium, he discovers that the missing grid is the tiled floor of the fountain itself, and solving it reveals the location of the missing will.

The story is notable for containing an entire crossword puzzle in which all the clues are rhyming couplets (or quatrains): for example,

One drop of vinegar to two of oil
Dresses this curly head sprung from the soil.

clues the word ENDIVE. The answers were included at the end of the book, allowing crossword fans to attempt to solve the puzzle themselves.

=== The Fantastic Horror of the Cat in the Bag ===
Two motorcyclists enter into a high speed chase on the Great North Road, which carries on for many miles and passes many startled passers-by and motorists. They are blocked from tearing through a village by a brave policeman, who stands in their way. The second motorist (Mr Walters) explains that he was only chasing the first motorist (Mr Simpkins) because Simpkins dropped a bag further up the road. Simpkins vehemently denies owning the bag, much to Walters' astonishment as he actually saw the bag fall from Simpkin's bike. A passer-by discovers that the bag in question contains part of a corpse, and the two motorcyclists are detained just as Lord Peter arrives to claim the bag, which he claims was full of jewellery and was stolen from him.

Suspicious, the policeman takes all three in for questioning, and Wimsey insists that he be given no preferential treatment, as he too wants this matter looked into. Wimsey recognizes the face of the dead woman as that of a wealthy socialite who horribly mistreated her husband. The socialite, who recently disappeared, was said to have travelled to America, and her husband was supposed to sail to meet her in a few days' time. Further inquiries elicit that Simpkins, who runs a delivery service, was unwittingly hired by the jewel thief to pick up the bag of stolen jewels at a local baggage depot. He knew nothing of either crime, nor was he aware that he was given the wrong bag at the depot as both bags were identical. He also did not discover the gruesome contents until much later. Afraid he would be arrested, Simpkins then attempted to get rid of the bag, but Walters happened to see the moment the bag fell and kindly tried to return it, setting up the events of the story. Both motorcyclists make up their disagreement, deciding to someday have a more legal race.

Wimsey recovers his own bag of jewels from the depot, and lays a trap for the socialite's husband on the steamer bound for America. The murderer is quickly arrested, and his final fate is left unknown.

=== The Unprincipled Affair of the Practical Joker ===
Wimsey is surprised when Mrs. Ruyslander, the wife of a diamond merchant, knocks on his hotel room door in the middle of the night. She asks for his help in recovering some stolen jewels, and a photograph with an indiscreet inscription, from a blackmailer before her husband returns from a trip to South Africa. Wimsey finds Paul Melville, the blackmailer, at one of his clubs; through sleight of hand, Wimsey convinces the other members of the club that Melville has been hiding cards up his sleeve during poker games. Wimsey agrees to confront the now-vehemently-protesting Melville alone. After some arguing, Melville, much to his annoyance, is forced to return the diamonds and photograph to clear his name. After regaining Mrs. Ruyslander's property, Wimsey then returns to the other members of the club and exonerates Melville by demonstrating how the simple conjuring trick was done, assuring the onlookers that there are some crimes the law does not need to touch.

=== The Undignified Melodrama of the Bone of Contention ===
Lord Peter is visiting a friend, Mr. Frobisher-Pym, in a small village in Essex. Mr. Burdock, a local member of the landed gentry, has recently died, leaving two sons: Martin, who married discreditably beneath his class and moved abroad, and Haviland, a businessman in London.

Peter is introduced to a villager who reports having seen a ghostly coach, drawn by four headless horses, galloping soundlessly in the middle of the night, which he takes as an omen of death. Peter goes to investigate, finding no clues, but meets the High Church vicar and learns of an unusual plan for various village inhabitants to keep an overnight vigil, two at a time, for the deceased Mr. Burdock.

Peter then borrows a horse and rides to a neighboring village to catch up with an old war comrade. On his way back, late at night and inebriated, he encounters the same ghostly coach, and notes where it goes. In the morning, he learns that the church has been vandalized and the two vigil-keepers locked in the cellar, apparently the work of Nonconformists. Regardless, Mr. Burdock's coffin is buried.

Investigating where the ghostly coach might have gone, Peter finds a barn containing a number of suspicious items that might have been used to make a carriage appear spectral. He visits the decaying manor house of the late Mr. Burdock, and discovers, behind a water-damaged copy of the Nuremberg Chronicle, the last will of the deceased gentleman. It contains a bizarre stipulation: as long as his body remains above ground, Martin inherits his wealth; but as soon as it is buried, it reverts to Haviland.

Since the body was apparently already buried, Haviland appears to have won, but it soon transpires that the coffin was empty, with the body having been removed by friends of Martin, who arranged the ghostly coach and vandalism of the church to distract from their theft of the corpse. But Haviland is not innocent either; the matching water stains on the Chronicle and the adjacent wall prove that the will had been only recently placed there. Martin, who was not aware of his friends' handiwork until after the fact, declares he will have his father entombed above the ground, and split the fortune with his brother. Lord Peter concludes that the whole affair "throws a sad light on human nature" and departs for London.

Sayers references the events of this story in the Wimsey novel Have His Carcase, as a nod to the fact that this later book contains a character named Haviland Martin.

=== The Vindictive Story of the Footsteps That Ran ===
While assisting a doctor friend with his experiments in curing diseases in rats, Wimsey and Bunter hear the sound of footsteps and shouting from the flat above. A moment later, the tenant comes running downstairs to get the doctor, hysterically proclaiming his wife Maddalena has been killed by a Mafioso who broke in through their kitchen window.

While the police are sent for, Wimsey searches the flat for clues, his subconscious telling him that something is strange about the whole story. The woman has been stabbed to the heart but with a strange, jagged weapon that has now been removed. There are no footprints on the sill or glass roof of the doctor's laboratory below, as the window-cleaner had recently been. Furthermore, though the chicken is burning in the oven, the bowl of dripping, which is full, has been already removed and set on the counter, suggesting the chicken was taken out and then hurriedly put back in again. Quickly, Wimsey realizes what was subconsciously bothering him – the sound of footsteps running came from the wrong direction, running to and fro in the kitchen instead of to the body and then to the stair as the tenant suggests. Pulling the skewer out from the chicken, Wimsey and the doctor discover traces of human blood on it, which the man was trying to burn off in the oven. His motive for the crime was unreasonable jealousy, as his pretty Italian wife attracted several admirers each time they went out.

=== The Bibulous Business of a Matter of Taste ===
A man going by the name of Death Bredon, claiming to be a journalist, heads to an old chateau in France, which contains a laboratory where an aging Count is inventing a formula that may be used in chemical warfare. It has been well-publicized that Lord Peter Wimsey himself has been sent to buy this formula for the British government. However, Bredon, in his supposed pursuit of Wimsey and the story, has been waylaid several times on the journey and nearly misses the train after being locked in a public lavatory.

Finally arriving at the chateau, Bredon sends in a letter purporting to be from Wimsey, saying he is Wimsey's cousin and has been sent ahead by him to visit the Count. Being shown in, he is confronted by two men claiming to be Lord Peter Wimsey, and both deny he is their cousin. When the Count suggests Bredon could identify which Wimsey is the impostor, Bredon tells the Count that he only communicates with his cousin in writing and has never seen him face to face.

After many hours of frustration, the Count decides the only way to solve the mystery is a wine-tasting test. Wimsey is famously known to be able to identify nearly all wines in existence by taste, even when blindfolded. Bredon is allowed to taste all the wines and venture an opinion so he will not feel left out, and he quickly leaves both "Wimseys" in the dust, proving his real identity. By this time, one false Wimsey is too inebriated to care, but the other attempts to take the formula by force. After the impostor is subdued by "Bredon", the real Wimsey, the Count declares that seeing the two Englishmen betraying their country to buy the formula for some foreign power has caused him to decide not to sell the formula to another country, even an ally, for fear he himself might someday be labelled a traitor. Wimsey wholeheartedly agrees with this decision, as he had disliked the idea of "trafficking in destruction" anyway.

=== The Learned Adventure of the Dragon's Head ===
At Mr Ffoliot's used bookstore, Lord Peter Wimsey and his 10-year-old nephew Viscount St George, alias "Gherkins", discover an old copy of Münster’s Cosmographia Universalis, which is in bad condition and missing several pages. Despite this, Gherkins buys it, wanting to start collecting old and rare books like his uncle. The book is one of several that Dr Conyers, a cancer specialist, sold to fund his research.

Wimsey and Gherkins (who is staying with his uncle) return home, and are soon visited by a man named Wilberforce Pope, who insists upon buying the Cosmographia from them. He cites sentimental reasons, saying he is Dr Conyers' relative and used to read the book as a boy. However, he shows little real knowledge as to the book's contents. Gherkins refuses to sell, and is backed up by Peter, who is suspicious of Pope's motives. Three nights later, the burglar alarm trips, and Wimsey and Bunter stop two criminals from stealing the Cosmographia. The two men confess they were hired by a mysterious gentleman, and told the theft of the book was merely a harmless prank. They describe Wilberforce Pope's appearance when asked what their employer looked like.

Peter and Gherkins examine the book, and go to stay with Dr Conyers. The doctor explains he wishes to build a hospital and a clinic to continue his research. He lately has been seeking "the treasure hidden in Munster", which retired pirate "Old Cut-Throat" Conyers bequeathed to his descendants many generations before. However, the doctor's capital has been severely depleted in searching both Munster, Ireland and Münster, Germany, with no success. Wimsey suggests that the Munster in question is really the author of the Cosmographia; opening the book in question, he shows Conyers an inscription someone has written around a dragon decoration in a map of the Canary Islands. It suggests the treasure may be in the Canaries, so Wimsey and Conyers decide to fund an expedition there. However, in the middle of the night, Wimsey looks out of the window and discovers that the man-made pond Old Cut-Throat built in the grounds has false islands and a dragon fountain corresponding exactly to the old map. He and Gherkins sneak out, take a dinghy from the boathouse, and explore the dragon fountain, finding the treasure chest inside. Mr Pope arrives on the scene minutes too late, in search of the treasure himself (to which he has no claim), and is arrested by policemen waiting in the shadows on Wimsey's orders. Gherkins and Wimsey give Dr Conyers his treasure, congratulating him on the hospital that is soon to be.

=== The Piscatorial Farce of the Stolen Stomach ===
Thomas MacPherson, a final year medical student in Scotland, shows Wimsey the very strange legacy his Great-Uncle Joseph Ferguson left him. Great-Uncle Joseph, who died at the age of 95 by throwing himself out of a sixth-floor window, bequeathed his grand-nephew only his stomach and alimentary organs, with their contents, preserved in a bottle. Wimsey suspects there is more to the story than an eccentric old man's whims, especially when he learns that Great-Uncle Joseph was said to be very rich but withdrew more than £84,000 (nearly £5.5 million today) from the bank in the years leading up to his death. The only other heir, one Robert Ferguson, is a greedy wastrel, and was upset to receive only a pittance.

Wimsey goes to Somerset House (where the Registry of Births, Marriages and Deaths was then located) and asks to see Great-Uncle Joseph's will. He finds that the old man was careful to specify that his entire alimentary canal be ligatured top and bottom, and that Ferguson was to study it, not keep it on the shelf. Wimsey encounters Robert there, and pretends to be writing a book on odd wills, hoping that will allay Robert's suspicions. He makes further inquiries and discovers from a friend in the jewellery business that Great-Uncle Joseph bought 12 large matching diamonds from assorted dealers, paying in cash for all of them. Wimsey immediately sends MacPherson a telegram advising him to open up the specimen, then washes his hands of the matter and attends a rare book auction.

However, the next day, Wimsey gets a telegram informing him that a burglar stole Great-Uncle Joseph's bottle from MacPherson's house. The burglar dropped the bottle in his flight, and the shards were found, but not the specimen. Wimsey heads back to Scotland, where he finds that MacPherson didn't see his first telegram, being out fishing at the time. Robert was also discovered fishing in the river that morning, but tried to flee when spotted by MacPherson and slipped and broke his kneecap, and is now staying in the house awaiting the arrival of a qualified doctor. Wimsey and MacPherson drive along the river until they find the specimen washed up on a bank and being eaten by seagulls. They bring it home, and dissect it. Eleven of the diamonds are still within, the twelfth having been presumably eaten by a gull. Wimsey then explains that he and Robert had both come to the conclusion that the old man had swallowed the diamonds shortly before committing suicide. MacPherson is more than happy with his eleven diamonds, though his manservant Jock insists upon shooting the gulls to find the twelfth.

=== The Unsolved Puzzle of the Man with No Face ===
Several passengers on a train are excitedly discussing a recent murder, in which a man was found on a beach, strangled, with his face cut off. Lord Peter Wimsey is among them, and cleverly deduces several facts about the case based on details mentioned by the passengers. A policeman, Inspector Winterbottom, overhears the conversation and takes Lord Peter's calling card.

Shortly afterwards, newspapers announce that police have identified the faceless victim as the studio manager of an advertising agency. The policeman from the train visits Wimsey and professes his theory that the murder was committed by an Italian over a love affair.

Peter meets with an old journalist friend and learns that the murder victim had had his portrait recently painted by one of his employees at the advertising agency. He goes to investigate, and finds that the portrait is a striking piece of art but an unflattering likeness, and purchases it from the artist. He interviews a woman working at the agency and learns that the victim was loathed by his employees, and that he commissioned the portrait but refused to buy it.

Meeting with Inspector Winterbottom again, Wimsey recounts his final theory of the murder, in which the frustrated artist opportunistically kills his manager and destroys the face he grew to hate while painting his portrait. Winterbottom congratulates him on his theory but reveals that the Italian suspect was found dead by suicide with an apparent confession, and that the case is closed.

Afterwards, Peter muses to himself that he could have proved that the artist was indeed the murderer, "but the man had a villainous face, and there are few good painters in the world."

=== The Adventurous Exploit of the Cave of Ali Baba ===
Shortly after the newspapers announce that Lord Peter Wimsey is suspected of having been killed while hunting big game in Africa, Rogers, a disgruntled footman who had been dismissed from his post, joins a mysterious and highly effective secret society of criminals. This society is unusual in that all members are required to wear black executioner's hoods with white numbers embroidered on them so no one knows anyone else's identity, whenever the gang meets together. To openly name another member means instant death. Rogers, now "Number 21", is told his principal duty is to give information about houses he has served in, and for two years is a useful and respected member of the society. After this time, however, things suddenly start to go wrong for the society – robbery attempts end in narrow escapes from being arrested instead of in lucrative hauls, stolen pearls turn out to be imitation, and so forth. Lord Peter Wimsey's mother loses a diamond tiara to the gang during this time.

Finally, the entire gang of 50 is called to a dance, but only 48 arrive. The gigantic and brutal man who is Number One informs them he has had two members secretly executed, as they have been arrested and he was afraid they would talk. He then exposes "Number 21" as the mole who has been ruining their plans. Rogers admits that the real footman Rogers was the one killed in the big game hunting accident, and that he is really Lord Peter Wimsey, who stole Rogers' identity for the purpose of infiltrating the gang and helping Scotland Yard finally bring them to justice. He offers, in exchange for a quick death and the sparing of Bunter, his mother, and his sister (whom he falsely claims know nothing of the matter), the combination to a secret room in the back of his safe, in which he has a book containing the identities and professions of all 50 members of the society.

Horrified, Number One (the only other person who knows everyone's identity) interrogates Wimsey in private and learns Wimsey is not bluffing. Returning to the gang and berating them for gross carelessness, he orders two men to go to retrieve Wimsey's book of evidence from the safe. The gang rises up against their leader, afraid the two men will be traitors as well. Number One is forced to go himself, leaving his mistress Number Two in charge. When he does not return, Wimsey admits to an enraged Number Two and the rest of the society that he had a second secret door in the hidden chamber, which, when the book was lifted, would slam shut and seal Number One in. The gang sets a time fuse to blow up their meeting house, despite Number Two's protests, and lock Wimsey inside before fleeing. They encounter hidden police officers, who had come when an electric alarm in Wimsey's safe alerted them. Wimsey informs Number Two that the secret door is voice-activated and only he can open it – she frees him, and the two escape just as the house goes up in flames. Chief Inspector Parker and Inspector Sugg are delighted to see Wimsey again, and they return to Wimsey's flat to let Number One out of the safe before he suffocates. Wimsey opens the voice-activated door with his code word, which turns out to be "Open Sesame", Ali Baba's password in the Arabian Nights.
