= A Presumption of Death =

2002 mystery novel by Jill Paton Walsh

- First edition
- Author: Jill Paton Walsh
- Language: English
- Series: Lord Peter Wimsey
- Genre: Crime novel
- Publisher: Hodder & Stoughton Ltd
- Publication date: November 2002
- Publication place: United Kingdom
- Media type: Print (hardback & paperback)
- ISBN: 0-340-82065-9
- OCLC: 59499647
- Preceded by: Thrones, Dominations
- Followed by: The Attenbury Emeralds

A Presumption of Death is a 2002 Lord Peter Wimsey–Harriet Vane mystery novel by Jill Paton Walsh, based loosely on The Wimsey Papers by Dorothy L. Sayers. The novel is Walsh's first original Lord Peter Wimsey novel, following Thrones, Dominations, which Sayers left as an unfinished manuscript, and was completed by Walsh. A Presumption of Death is written by Walsh, except for excerpts from The Wimsey Papers.

== Plot ==
Harriet (Lady Peter Wimsey) has evacuated her family to the Wimseys' country house, Talboys in Hertfordshire, taking her two children, along with the three children of her sister-in-law, Lady Mary, and Peter's venerable old housekeeper, Mrs Trapp. Peter and Bunter are away on an undercover assignment.

During an ARP drill, a young woman is murdered in the village, and Superintendent Kirk (who last appeared in Busman's Honeymoon) recruits Harriet to help solve the murder, as the police are short-staffed due to the war and Harriet, as a crime novelist and the wife of a detective, is felt to be the best-qualified available person to find the murderer.

The murdered girl, Wendy Percival, had come from the city as a Land Girl, to do agricultural work and help the war effort. She was killed in the village street while most people were in the village's two air raid shelters during the drill, and much of the investigation turns on who had been, or could have been, outside the shelters when the murder was committed. Patient investigation leads Harriet to eliminate several potential suspects, including two young men in the village with whom Wendy flirted and the RAF pilot who was last with her on the night she died. She also establishes that everyone in the shelters is accounted for, and that there was no way for anyone to leave either shelter unnoticed during the drill. Glumly, she reflects that her list of possible suspects has been reduced to a random "wandering maniac".

Returning home from one of her investigations, Harriet encounters "Bungo", Peter's old school friend and now a high-ranking officer in British Intelligence, who has received a coded message from Peter which Peter had said only she could decipher. The message is based on a book code, and after thinking carefully she realises that the key to the code is the sonnet which she started and Peter completed in Gaudy Night. The decoded message says that Peter and Bunter have accomplished their mission, but their danger is now great and they must come home separately. They require assistance to get home, and the message says which routes they will be taking. By solving the cipher, Harriet has saved Peter's life, just as he once saved her life. The message also instructs Harriet, in the event of his death, to read the letter he left for her in his bureau. Handling the unopened letter, Harriet reflects ruefully on the years she spent avoiding Peter's proposals of marriage, when all she wants now is to be with him again. Then she realises that she married him when the time was right for her, and that to have "settled" on the wrong terms would have been disastrous for both of them.

=== Bunter returns ===
On a brief trip to London to meet the Wimsey family solicitor, Harriet is trapped in the basement of her old home by a sudden air raid, and is surprised to encounter a dishevelled Bunter, returned home from his and Peter's mission. He says he has no word from Peter. The following week, he appears at Talboys to resume service with the household, since he has been denied permission to re-enlist in the army because of his age.

At the suggestion of Peter's sister Mary, Harriet summarises her progress in the murder investigation in letters to Peter, which she does not send. While writing one of these letters, Harriet realises that there is one person she has overlooked: an RAF pilot named Alan Brinklow, billeted in the village while recovering from a broken ankle. Not being a villager, he would not have been in either of the air raid shelters, but not being posted to any of the surrounding air bases, he would not have been expected there either. Although she has no reason to suspect Brinklow of having a motive to kill Wendy, Superintendent Kirk agrees to question him.

=== Peter returns ===
Peter returns, alive and well, to Harriet's immense relief and joy. A short time later, Kirk returns to Talboys to report that Brinklow's dead body has been found buried behind a farmer's shed. Peter is confused, saying he recognises the name Brinklow from his own mission and the man is already long dead.

Bungo is summoned to Talboys, and is present as Peter explains that Alan Brinklow was shot down over the North Sea some weeks ago; his body was recovered by a British patrol boat, whose captain decided to plant some false papers on the body and send it drifting into enemy territory, hoping to mislead the enemy. The ploy worked, but the Germans decided to infiltrate an enemy agent into Britain, using Brinklow's name, as they thought the British were unaware that the real Brinklow was dead. The "Brinklow" who had been living in Paggleham for the past few weeks was actually a German spy.

Bungo explains that "pseudo-Brinklow" is unlikely to have been killed by anyone from British Intelligence, as they would want any enemy agent captured alive. Kirk is at a loss for any other suspects, until Harriet suggests that the real Alan Brinklow might have had an enemy for some reason. In Brinklow's records, Peter and Harriet trace the name of a young woman, Joan Quarley, living in Northumberland. When they confront Joan's brother, an RAF pilot named Jeff, he admits that Alan was his squadmate, and that he and Joan fell in love, and she became pregnant with his child before his last mission.

Officially they were told that Alan was missing and presumed dead, but then they heard rumours that an "Alan Brinklow" was living in Paggleham. Jeff went there to confront Alan, and forced pseudo-Brinklow to meet him in private, at night. Not seeing the man clearly, Jeff demanded to know what "Alan" was going to do about Joan. When the man responded, "Who is Joan?", Jeff went berserk and attacked him. Finding himself in a fight to the death, Jeff drew a knife and tried to cut Alan's hamstrings, but accidentally cut the man's throat instead. Seeing the man in the light, Jeff saw that it was not Alan after all, so he buried the body in a panic and fled Paggleham.

After repeating this story for Bungo, Superintendent Kirk, and his commanding officer, Jeff is allowed to return to duty. Bungo tells Mrs Quarley that Jeff will not be charged with any crime, and the real Alan Brinklow acted honourably and died bravely. Mrs Quarley, who suspected Jeff's role in pseudo-Brinklow's murder, is vastly relieved, while Joan is triumphant, vindicated in her faith in the man she loved.

=== Return from Northumberland ===
On their way back to Hertfordshire, Peter and Harriet make a brief overnight stop at Duke's Denver, where Peter reflects that his nephew, Lord St. George, also an RAF pilot, is unlikely to survive the war, which would mean that Peter would become the heir to the dukedom. However, Peter is determined that he and Harriet will raise their sons as "normal" boys, not as aristocrats, since the privileges accorded to the nobility become harder to justify with each passing year, and will become even harder to justify when the war is over.

Over dinner with Peter's mother, the Dowager Duchess, the news service announces Neville Chamberlain's resignation as Prime Minister and his replacement by Winston Churchill, who promises only "blood, toil, tears and sweat".

Returning to Talboys, Harriet says she is unhappy to be coming home to a still-unsolved murder. Peter says that, on the contrary, Harriet did solve Wendy Percival's murder, having eliminated all the possible suspects except pseudo-Brinklow. As to his motive, Peter says they may never know for sure, but he can make an educated guess: Wendy, who traveled extensively in Europe before the war and was drawn to handsome men of any nationality, must have met pseudo-Brinklow in Germany, and recognised him instantly when they encountered each other, by chance, in the village during the drill. He had no choice but to silence her immediately. Harriet remarks that it is a strange inversion: pseudo-Brinklow killed Wendy because she recognised him for who he really was, yet he was killed himself because of who he was pretending to be.

=== The radio signals ===
The only mystery, Peter says, is exactly what pseudo-Brinklow's mission in Paggleham was. This mystery is solved by, of all people, Peter's ten-year-old nephew, Charlie Parker, and his friend from the village, Sam Bateson. Charlie got a crystal radio set from Lord St. George as a present, but was frustrated because it had an intermittent fault. Now he realises it was working perfectly, but intercepting signals from a transmitter in the village: the last of which occurred just before pseudo-Brinklow was killed. Charlie and Sam borrowed a book on Morse code and wrote down their intercepts, even though they cannot decipher them. Peter delivers the intercepts to Bungo, and a few days later a secret air base near Paggleham is closed and relocated.

Peter is retired from active service and, while still involved in intelligence, assures Harriet that he will not be sent abroad again. He confesses to Harriet his worry that being married to her, and fathering their children, has sapped his bravery, and made him unfit to undertake another assignment. Harriet shrewdly points out that this is not true: she recalls Bunter's account of his separation from Peter during the mission, when one of them had to go home by the safer of two routes, and they decided to flip a coin for it. Bunter suspected, and Peter now admits to Harriet, that Peter deliberately faked the coin toss to send Bunter home by the safer route. Peter is reminded of why he loves Harriet: she sees him more clearly than he sees himself. Embracing her, he shows her a copy of Shelley's Prometheus Unbound and they read the last passage together, that true love between two persons is not war, but it is the surest form of victory.

== Continuity ==
- Bungo was named, though he did not appear, in Sayers' novel Have His Carcase, as an expert on codes. During his conversation with Harriet, she mentions how she and Peter cracked the Playfair cipher message in that novel.
- Harriet realises that the key to Peter's cipher is the sonnet that Harriet started and Peter completed in Gaudy Night.
- Harriet recalls her own trial for the murder of her lover, Phillip Boyes, depicted in Strong Poison.
- Miss Katherine "Kitty" Climpson and Dean Letitia Martin (and Miss De Vine) previously appeared in Strong Poison and Gaudy Night respectively.

== Reception ==
Kirkus Reviews praised the book but not before issuing a slight warning to readers stating "though the mystery is gossamer-thin, Paton Walsh (Thrones, Dominations, 1998, etc.) provides another Greatest Hits of Wimseydom..."
