= Charles Parker (character) =

Fictional character by Dorothy L. Sayers

- Lord Peter Wimsey character
- First appearance: Whose Body?
- Last appearance: Murder Must Advertise
- Created by: Dorothy L. Sayers
- Portrayed by: Austin Trevor (Film); Mark Eden (Television); Gabriel Woolf (BBC Radio); David Quilter (Television); Nicholas Boulton (BBC Radio)

In-universe information
- Gender: Male
- Occupation: Police Detective
- Spouse: Lady Mary Wimsey
- Children: Charles Peter Parker; Mary Lucasta Parker
- Nationality: English

Sergeant/Inspector/Chief Inspector Charles Parker is a fictional police detective who appears in several Lord Peter Wimsey stories by Dorothy L. Sayers, and later becomes Lord Peter's brother-in-law.

== Sayers works ==
He is first introduced in Whose Body? as a Detective Inspector from Scotland Yard. In the next book, Clouds of Witness, he is summoned to assist the local police in the North Riding of Yorkshire who are investigating the death of Captain Denis Cathcart, the fiancé of Peter's sister, Lady Mary Wimsey, apparently at the hands of Wimsey's brother, the Duke of Denver.

Parker first sees Lady Mary at the inquest into Cathcart. Travelling to Paris, where Cathcart had lived previously, he uncovers evidence which implicates Lady Mary in Cathcart's death, leading to Parker becoming very depressed, since he is clearly in love with her. Lady Mary later confesses to killing Cathcart. Lord Peter, however, proves that Mary was lying to protect her secret lover Goyles, with whom she had been planning to elope on the night of Cathcart's death. Parker is happy to see Mary break off the relationship, as Goyles proves to be unreliable and cowardly.

At the end of the case, when Denver is proved innocent, Wimsey, Parker and another of Wimsey's friends, the financier the Hon. Freddy Arbuthnot, all become roaring drunk when celebrating the outcome.

Parker subsequently assists Wimsey in his investigations in Unnatural Death and The Unpleasantness at the Bellona Club. In the latter, Parker is promoted to Chief Inspector. He has meanwhile invited Lady Mary to dinner several times, but is nervous of making their relationship public, in spite of Wimsey's encouragement.

In Strong Poison, Parker has apparently made a good case against mystery writer Harriet Vane for the murder of her former lover Philip Boyes. Wimsey, who has instantly fallen in love with Harriet, forces Parker to re-examine the case. Parker's investigations are inconclusive, but Wimsey, with Parker's help, discovers and unmasks the true murderer. Meanwhile, Parker has finally proposed to Lady Mary. The Duke and Duchess of Denver are very surprised by the match, but Wimsey insists that "one of these days he'll be a big man, with a title, I shouldn't wonder, and everything handsome about him."

In Five Red Herrings, Parker assists the Dumfriesshire constabulary by easily tracing a suspect who has fled to London in disguise (although he proves to be innocent). In Have His Carcase, Parker and Lady Mary are married; Parker has a very minor role, responding by mail when Wimsey inquires about possible Communist affiliations of one suspect, and providing witnesses to the identity of another.

By the time of the next book, Murder Must Advertise, he and Mary have two small children, Charles Peter and Mary Lucasta. Wimsey is investigating the death of a copywriter, which proves to be linked to Parker's official enquiries into a drug-trafficking ring. Parker is attacked and injured by a suspect when he is mistaken for Wimsey.

The book also notes an ingenious solution to the problems inherent in a marriage where the wife is far richer than her husband: Mary's money was placed into a trust fund, administered by her brothers on behalf of her children, from which she gets every three months a sum equal to that earned by her husband in the same timeframe. Mary, once an outspoken left-winger embarrassed by her aristocratic status, is quite happy with the arrangement.

In The Nine Tailors, Parker once again assists a county police force, this time the Lincolnshire Constabulary, in Wimsey's investigation into the case of an unlawfully buried body. One suspect is a former burglar from London; two other suspects (who are brothers) flee to London or attempt to conceal evidence there. Parker uses questionable tactics when he places a hidden microphone in the interview room where they are waiting (or in the TV adaptation, leaves a desk intercom "live"). However, the brothers' unguarded conversation absolves them both of the crime of murder.

Parker does not feature in Gaudy Night, and appears only very briefly at the wedding of Wimsey and Harriet Vane in Busman's Honeymoon. The Duchess of Denver is snobbishly opposed to that match as well, and writes to a friend, "Mary's policeman was bad enough, but he is at any rate quiet and well-behaved..."

== Jill Paton Walsh works ==
In A Presumption of Death, the World War II Wimsey novel by Jill Paton Walsh, Harriet takes the three children of Charles and Mary to Talboys, together with her own children – both to keep them safe from bombed London and to free their parents to help the war effort.

The Attenbury Emeralds, Walsh's next addition to the Wimsey series, Parker is now Sir Charles Parker. The story includes a flashback to Wimsey and Parker's first meeting in 1921, never described in the original Sayers books. As depicted here, Wimsey was a shell-shocked World War I veteran who accidentally discovered in himself a talent for detection while present in the house of another aristocratic family when emerald heirlooms mysteriously disappeared. Parker was a police sergeant assigned to the case, and Wimsey is struck by the sergeant's odd choice of spare time reading: Origen.

== Character and appearance ==
Parker appears to be close to Wimsey's age. He was born or raised in Barrow in Furness, a steelworks town created in the 19th century Industrial Revolution, which tends to increase the contrast between his origins and those of the aristocratic Wimsey. Parker has one elder unmarried sister, of whom he is fond though they rarely meet. (On one occasion he sends her lingerie from Paris.)

Parker has evidently received a good education, and before meeting Wimsey, one of his pursuits was evangelical theology. He is mentioned as reading some biblical commentary as a relaxation before going to sleep.

In Clouds of Witness it is noted that Parker is not usually given to sudden bright flashes of insight or spectacular displays of happy guesswork, which are "more in Wimsey's line". Rather, he had "made his way from modest beginnings to a respectable appointment in the CID by a combination of hard work, shrewdness and caution".

His skill as a detective and the resources of the Metropolitan Police (for example, in The Unpleasantness at the Bellona Club he can summon a handwriting expert at the push of a button) often lead to him being asked to assist baffled county police forces, who have sometimes literally trampled over vital evidence. (He remarks to Peter in Clouds of Witness as they both examine the ground where Cathcart's body was found, "Oh, that's a constable. I put him at eighteen stone.") He sometimes has to console officers from other forces who feel their efforts are inadequate.

By appearance he is apparently undistinguished, although just under six foot in height, and athletically built. He is able to mix easily in the circles frequented by Wimsey by donning the appropriate clothing (e.g. a formal evening suit). The books are set against a background of sometimes artificial class distinctions. When a maidservant in the household of a wealthy lady remarks (in The Unpleasantness at the Bellona Club) that Parker appears to be "Quite the gentleman", the cook rebukes her, saying "No Nellie; gentlemanlike I will not deny; but a policeman is a person and I will trouble you to remember it."

A passage in Unnatural Death indicates a rather unequal division of labour between Parker and Wimsey in joint investigations, where it is taken for granted that any long and tedious legwork will fall to Parker. When involved in such investigation on a hot London day, Parker – grabbing a hasty snack at a sleazy restaurant – feels rather resentful when thinking of Wimsey at the same time eating at his club. However, later feeling elated by having discovered an important clue, Parker never expresses this resentment directly to Wimsey.

Parker is the only intimate friend Wimsey has, as demonstrated by their ability to engage in witty repartee without competition or malice. The only other character with whom Peter achieves this sort of intellectual companionship is Harriet Vane. Parker is also on congenial terms with the Dowager Duchess of Denver, owing to her close relationship with her second son. (The most in-depth descriptions of the friendship between Parker and Wimsey are in The Unpleasantness at the Bellona Club in which Sayers describes the two men's interactions with each other.)

Robert Kuhn McGregor notes in respect to Whose Body? that Parker "is not Conan Doyle's Doctor Watson nor his Inspector LeStrade. [sic] He and Wimsey are genuinely a team." By Unnatural Death, however, "the highly effective team of Wimsey and Parker begins to dissolve" and in subsequent novels Parker "slips into the role of supporting character as Wimsey takes over the stories more completely." Christine Colón argues that Parker demonstrates the importance of community; by the end of Strong Poison,

Sayers has masterfully shifted the focus from the individual detective to the community that surrounds him, a community that supports his job by doing their own work extremely well. She also implicitly broadens this vision by demonstrating that Inspector Parker, Miss Climpson, and Miss Murchison are not simply waiting around until they can be useful to Peter. They are actively pursuing their own vocations and doing their own work to make their community better.

== Adaptations ==
In the 1931 film The Silent Passenger, Parker was played by Austin Trevor.

Several Peter Wimsey stories were made into BBC television series in the 1970s, starring Ian Carmichael. In these, Parker was played by Mark Eden.

In the 1980s, three more stories (involving Harriet Vane) were made into BBC television serials. This time Wimsey was played by Edward Petherbridge and Parker was portrayed by David Quilter.

In the BBC's radio dramatisations (also starring Ian Carmichael) Parker was voiced by Gabriel Woolf.
