= The Unpleasantness at the Bellona Club =

1928 mystery novel by Dorothy L. Sayers

- First edition
- Author: Dorothy L. Sayers
- Language: English
- Series: Lord Peter Wimsey
- Genre: Mystery novel
- Publisher: Ernest Benn
- Publication date: 1928
- Publication place: United Kingdom
- Media type: Print
- Pages: 287
- Preceded by: Unnatural Death
- Followed by: Strong Poison

The Unpleasantness at the Bellona Club is a 1928 mystery novel by Dorothy L. Sayers, her fourth featuring Lord Peter Wimsey. Much of the novel is set in the Bellona Club, a fictional London club for war veterans (Bellona being a Roman goddess of war).

== Plot ==
On the afternoon of 10 November, ninety-year-old General Fentiman is called to the deathbed of his estranged sister, Lady Dormer. He learns that, under the terms of her will, he stands to inherit most of her substantial fortune (money sorely needed by his grandsons, Robert and George Fentiman). However, should the General die first, nearly everything will go to Lady Dormer's companion Ann Dorland.

Lady Dormer dies the next morning, Armistice Day, and that afternoon the General is found dead in his armchair at the Bellona Club. Dr Penberthy, a club member and the General's personal physician, certifies death by natural causes but is unable to state the exact time the General died. As the estate would amply provide for all three claimants, the Fentiman brothers suggest a negotiated settlement, but Ann Dorland absolutely refuses. Wimsey is asked to investigate the General's time of death.

Oddly enough, nobody saw the General arrive at the club at his usual time of 10 am. His manservant reports that the General did not return home after visiting Lady Dormer the day before. An unknown man by the name of Mr Oliver had telephoned to say that the General would be spending the night with him. Robert Fentiman says that he knows of Oliver, and much time is spent chasing the elusive individual through several countries before Robert admits that he does not actually exist.

Wimsey discovers that General Fentiman began to feel unwell while visiting his sister, and left her house to visit Dr Penberthy. The General then travelled to the club, meeting George Fentiman en route. At the club, the General informed Robert of the terms of the will; later, Robert discovered his grandfather had died of heart failure in the club library. Annoyed at losing his inheritance, Robert concealed the body overnight and invented Oliver to cover up the death. The next day, while the club members had stepped outside to observe the usual two minutes' silence at 11 am, Robert moved the body to the armchair.

Wimsey believes the General's death is too convenient to be natural and has the body exhumed. An autopsy proves the General was poisoned by an overdose of the heart medication digitalis. When it becomes known that the body will be exhumed, Ann Dorland, who has an obvious motive, suddenly and suspiciously agrees to the proposed compromise with the Fentimans.

Wimsey finds Ann Dorland distressed by the callous and humiliating behaviour of Dr Penberthy, to whom she had been secretly engaged. It was he, with an eye on her expected inheritance, who had insisted she should refuse the compromise and fight for the whole estate. When it became known that the General would be exhumed, Penberthy broke the engagement off, giving highly insulting reasons. He had hoped that Ann would be embarrassed into silence, but Wimsey manages to get the truth from her.

Wimsey works out what had happened. When the General had consulted Dr Penberthy after seeing his sister, he had mentioned that under the terms of the will Ann Dorland would not inherit if Lady Dormer were to die before he did. To ensure that that did not happen, Penberthy prescribed the General a massive dose of digitalis, to be taken later that evening when Penberthy would not be in attendance. Contriving to be present later when the body was discovered, Penberthy was able to certify a natural death without arousing suspicion, in spite of Robert's intervention which initially confused the time.

Penberthy writes a confession publicly exonerating Ann Dorland, and shoots himself in the club library. The three original claimants to the estate meet to divide it equitably, and Robert begins courting Ann.

== Principal characters ==
- Lord Peter Wimsey – aristocratic amateur detective; Bellona Club member
- Detective-Inspector Charles Parker – Wimsey's friend
- Mervyn Bunter – Wimsey's manservant
- Mr John Murbles – solicitor to the Wimsey and Fentiman families
- General Arthur Fentiman (deceased) – elderly retired soldier; Bellona Club member
- Lady Dormer (deceased) – General Fentiman's wealthy widowed sister
- Major Robert Fentiman – General Fentiman's older grandson; Bellona Club member
- Captain George Fentiman – General Fentiman's younger grandson; Bellona Club member
- Sheila Fentiman – wife of George Fentiman
- Ann Dorland – distant relative of and companion to Lady Dormer
- Dr John Penberthy – impecunious physician; Bellona Club member
- Marjorie Phelps – artist friend of Wimsey and of Ann Dorland
- Salcombe Hardy – journalist writing for the Daily Yell
- Captain Culyer – Bellona Club secretary
- Colonel Marchbanks – Bellona Club member
- Mr Wetheridge – Bellona Club member
- Dick Challoner – Bellona Club member

== Literary significance and criticism ==
Writing in 1990 Katherine Kenny described the book as the most successful of Sayers' early fiction, coupling a slick detective plot with vivid details of post-war English life. "The book is a tightly constructed little drama based upon the old joke about an Englishman's club so stuffy that its dead members cannot be differentiated from the living – a pertinent comment upon the society so described.”

== Adaptations ==
In 1973 the novel was the subject of a BBC TV mini-series starring Ian Carmichael as Wimsey. In 1975 it was broadcast on BBC radio as a serial in six 30-minute parts, also starring Ian Carmichael.
