= Lord Peter =

Lord Peter may refer to:

- Lord Peter (short story collection), a 1972 collection of short stories featuring Lord Peter Wimsey
- Lord Peter (fairy tale), a Norwegian fairy tale
