= Maude Goodman =

British painter and illustrator (1853–1938)

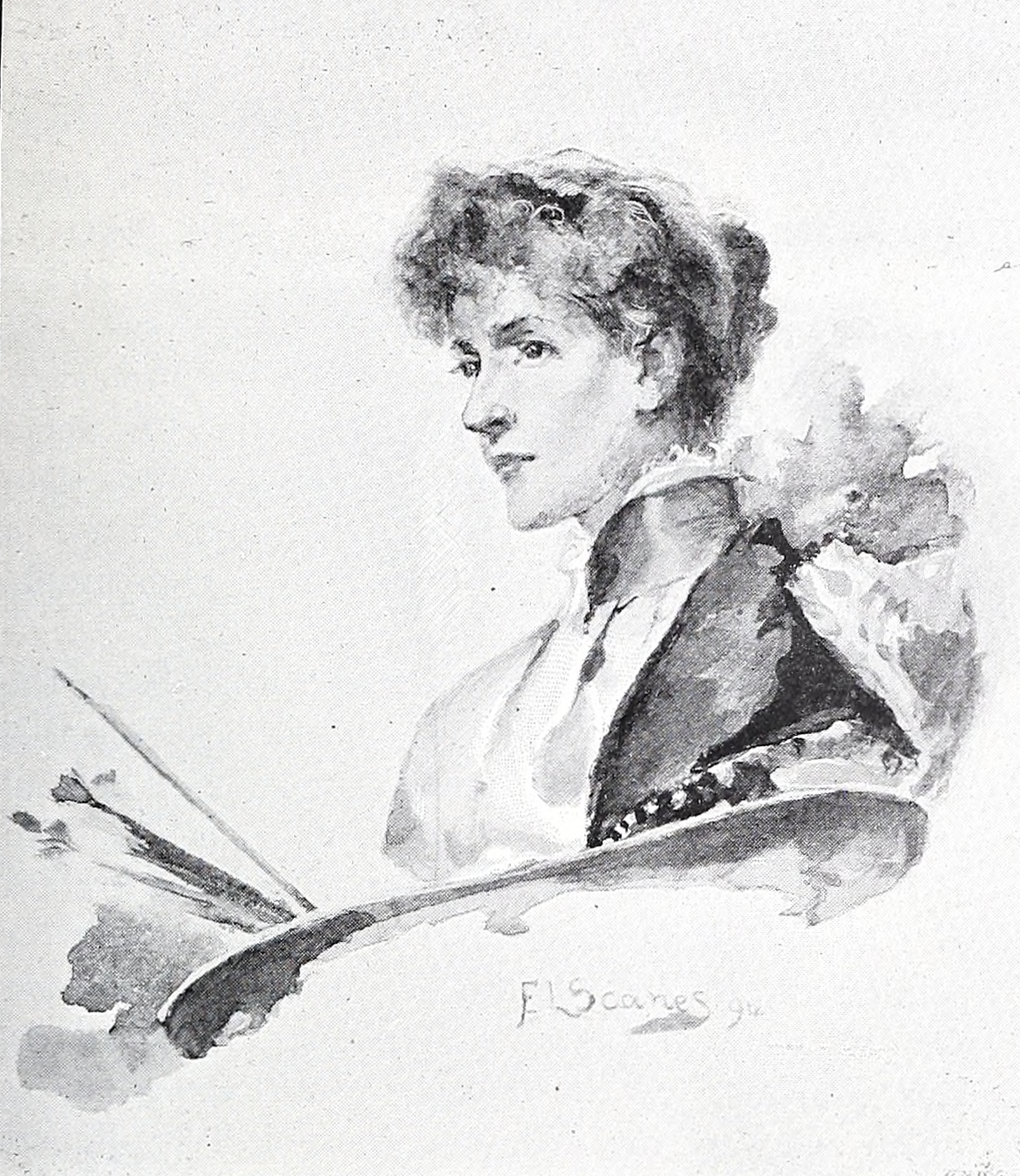
- Goodman in 1898
- Born: Matilda Goodman; 1853; Manchester, UKGBI
- Died: 23 March 1938 (aged 84–85); Kensington, London, UK
- Other names: Maude Scanes; Matilda Scanes
- Education: School of Art
- Occupations: Painter; illustrator
- Spouse: Arthur Scanes (m. 1882)
- Children: 2

Matilda "Maude" Goodman (married name Scanes; 1853 – 23 March 1938) was a British painter and illustrator, known for her sentimental depictions of domestic life.

== Biography ==
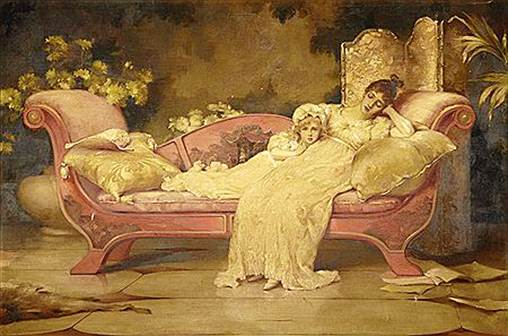
Hush! (or, A Moment of Idleness.)

Goodman was born Matilda Goodman in 1853 in Manchester to Jewish parents Louis Goodman, a Russian-born cigar dealer, and Amelia Goodman. Following the death of her mother, Goodman was later raised and encouraged in her pursuit of art education by her step-mother who was also Jewish. Goodman studied art in London at the School of Art in South Kensington, now the Royal College of Art. She was a pupil of Edward Poynter and also for a time studied under the tutelage of a Spanish painter who was visiting London, and had himself been a pupil of Fortuny. The artistic style of Poynter can be seen in Goodman's art, as well as influences and artistic devices from contemporaneous Pre-Raphaelite artists among whom she is associated.

Having won a 'Queen's prize' scholastic art award in 1873 and then finishing her schooling, Goodman began to flourish as an artist in 1874. She exhibited her first oil on canvas work at the Royal Academy Summer Exhibition in London. This would be the first of 54 works Goodman exhibited there regularly until 1901. Goodman also exhibited over the course of her career at other exhibitions and galleries including the Grosvenor Gallery, the Royal Institute of Painters in Water Colours, Royal Birmingham Society of Artists and the Walker Art Gallery in Liverpool. The index in each edition of "The Year's Art" for the span of those years contains more information about each exhibition.

In 1876 William Michael Rossetti, the brother of Pre-Raphaelite painter Dante Gabriel Rossetti, commented that there was something "above the common in the colour and tone" in Maude's work. Since she signed her paintings "M. Goodman" this may have at one time, early in her career, lent itself to a misunderstanding resulting in her being referred to in the Athenaeum as Mr. M. Goodman. Her art received a favourable review in that context. Afterward however, no doubt becoming aware of the mistake, the Athenaeum did not make much further mention of Miss M. Goodman or her art, in its pages.

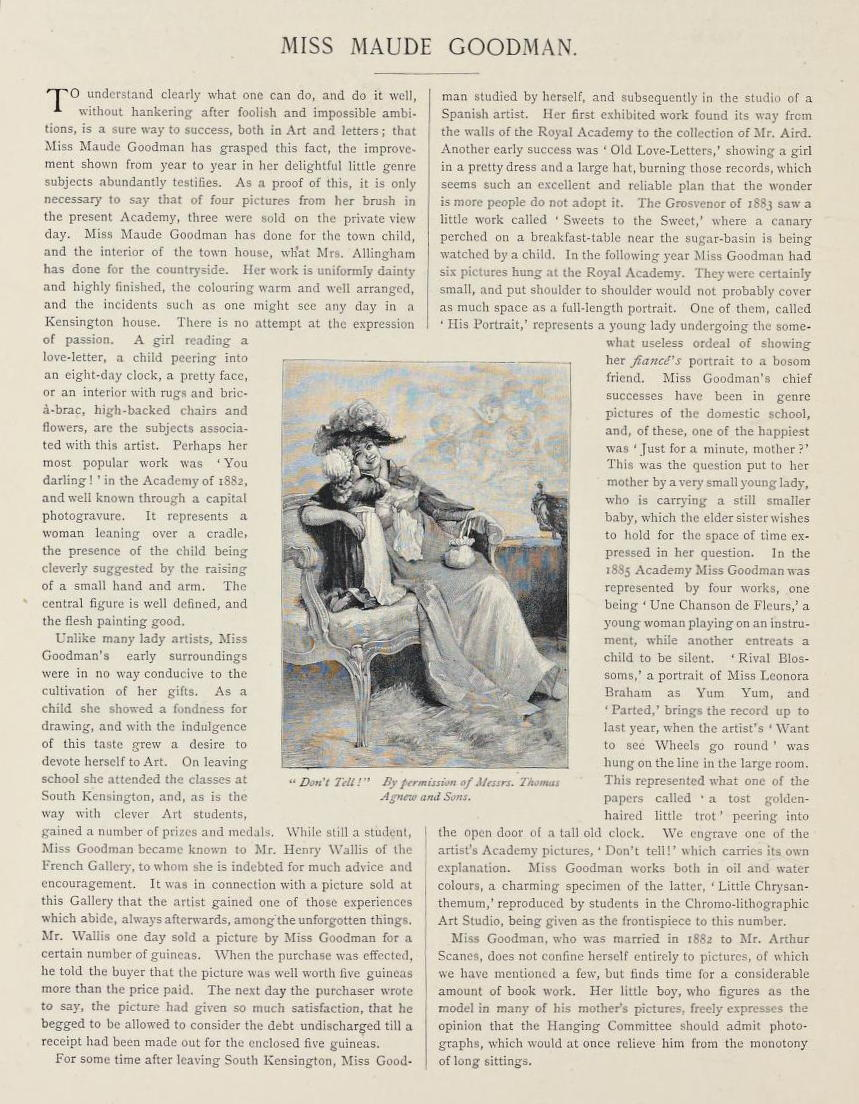
"Miss Maude Goodman," a biographical article in The Art Journal in 1889.

In April 1892 Walker Hodgson drew Goodman's portrait. It was exhibited in the Christopher Wood Gallery A Fraternity of Artists Exhibition in 1984.

Goodman exhibited her work at the Palace of Fine Arts at the 1893 World's Columbian Exposition in Chicago, Illinois.

A photograph of Maude's painting Hush! was included in the supplementary section of the 1905 book Women Painters of the World as well as being depicted in Henry Blackburn's Academy Notes of 1894, the year this painting was exhibited at the Royal Academy Summer Exhibition in London.

Goodman illustrated various editions of Raphael Tuck & Sons Children's books and postcards, with two of these containing poetry contributed by her husband, Arthur Scanes.

Victorian periodicals often featured Goodman's life story and printed art, for example The Girl's Realm of 1902 reported on an interview that Henriette Corkran held with Maude. This was conducted at her house at 7 Addison Crescent in West Kensington. It was from this house that she had been working as an artist since 1894 and carried on living and working there until her death in 1938.

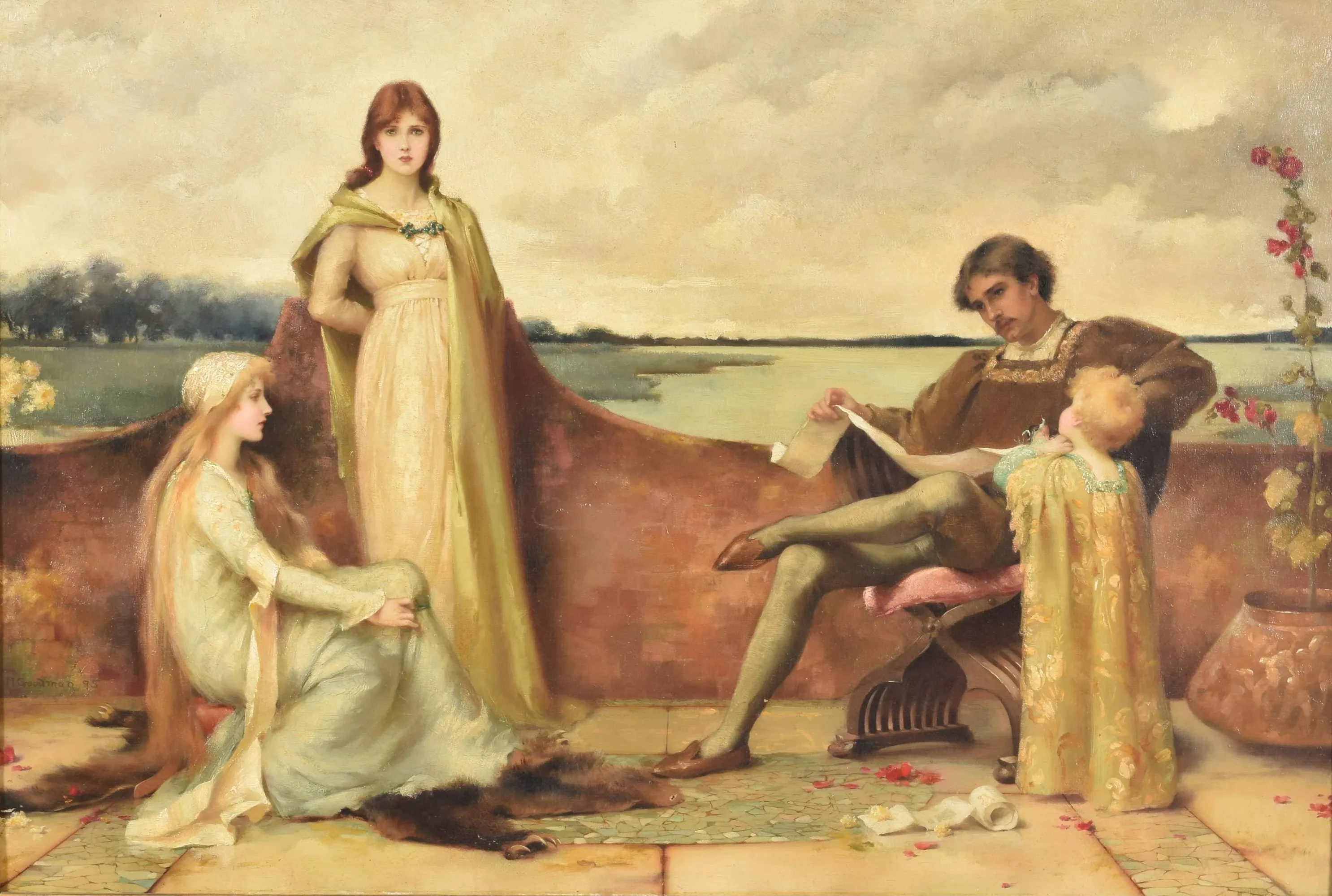
A Poem, displayed at the Royal Academy in 1895.

The Illustrated London News provided colour prints of Goodman's art as supplements in 1904, and Weldon's Ladies magazines produced many black and white prints of Maude's art, as supplements to their magazines well into the 1910s. However, Victorian art in general went out of fashion after the turn of the century and with the rise of Art Nouveau there saw a decline in the interest in art such as Maude Goodman's.

W. L. George in The Intelligence of Women (1916) suggests that in the defense of the talent of female artists, some may "shyly whisper" the name of Maude Goodman, though he was "not carried away with the splendours of Taller than Mother," one of her paintings exhibited in the Royal Academy Summer Exhibition of 1892. A photograph of this painting was included in the Illustrated Royal Academy Catalog and also in Henry Blackburn's Academy Notes for 1892.

== In popular culture ==
Goodman is mentioned by Dorothy L. Sayers in The Wimsey Papers VI as an overly cloying painter of idealized children in Arcadian settings; the writer reported that the boys in her nursery of the 1890s took a gift Goodman out of its frame and used it as a pea-shooting target.

E.M. Forster in Howards End expresses an "amused superiority at [the] bad taste" of the aspiring working-class character Leonard Bast, whose apartment includes a print of "one of the masterpieces of Maud [sic] Goodman." Dr. Aziz in A Passage to India "shares Leonard's taste in paintings: 'Aziz in an occidental moment would have hung Maud [sic] Goodmans on the walls.'"

== Personal life ==
In 1882, Goodman married Arthur Edward Scanes, an accountant, after which she continued to use her maiden name professionally. The couple had two children, both of whom served as models for her artwork.

On 23 March 1938, Goodman died in Kensington, London.
