= Striding Folly =

1972 short story collection by Dorothy Sayers

- First edition
- Author: Dorothy L. Sayers
- Language: English
- Genre: Short stories
- Publisher: New English Library
- Publication date: 1972

Striding Folly is a collection of short stories by Dorothy L. Sayers featuring Lord Peter Wimsey. First published in 1972, it contains the final three Lord Peter stories. The first two, "Striding Folly" and "The Haunted Policeman", were previously published in Detection Medley (1939), an anthology of detective stories. The third one, "Talboys", was unpublished. All three stories were also anthologized by James Sandoe in the collection Lord Peter: A Collection of All the Lord Peter Wimsey Stories.

The book also included a long preface by Janet Hitchman, including an extensive analysis of the character of Wimsey and his relation to Sayers' life, and including a previously unpublished letter of Sayers to Victor Gollancz.

== Contents ==
- Introduction: Lord Peter Wimsey and His Creator, by Janet Hitchman
- Striding Folly – Lord Peter comes to the rescue of Mr. Merrilow, who is falsely accused of murdering his opponent in a chess match. A dream and some footsteps are the key to the mystery.
- The Haunted Policeman – On the night Wimsey's first son is born, a policeman finds a body in house 13 on a street with only even numbers, and house and body disappear afterwards. Peter goes undercover to prevent the bobby being dismissed for drunkenness.
- Talboys – The Wimseys and their three sons have the discourteous and meddlesome Miss Quirk wished upon them as a houseguest. Things become even more complicated when 6 year old Bredon Wimsey is accused of stealing a neighbor's prize peaches and Miss Quirk is adamant she has proof of his guilt.

== Sources ==
- Sayers, Dorothy L, and Janet Hitchman. Striding Folly, Including Three Final Lord Peter Wimsey Stories. Dunton Green, Sevenoaks, Kent: New English Library (ISBN 978-0450549731), 1991. Print.
- Sayers, Dorothy L. Lord Peter: A Collection of All the Lord Peter Wimsey Stories. New York: Harper & Row (ISBN 978-0060137878), 1972.
