= Duke of Denver =

Fictional title created by Dorothy Sayers

In the works of Dorothy L. Sayers, the fictional title of Duke of Denver is held by Gerald Wimsey, older brother of the books' protagonist, Lord Peter Wimsey. In novels written after Sayers' death by Jill Paton Walsh (with the cooperation of the Sayers estate), Lord Peter also eventually holds the title. Sayers and several friends constructed an elaborate backstory for the duchy.

== In Sayers's works ==
=== Novels ===
In Sayers's stories, Lord Peter was the second of the three children of Mortimer Wimsey, 15th Duke of Denver.

The duchy, Wimsey's mother the dowager duchess, and his brother Gerald Christian Wimsey, the then Duke of Denver, were introduced in Sayers's first Wimsey novel, Whose Body?.

The 1935 second edition of Sayers's second novel, Clouds of Witness, included a fictitious entry from Debrett's Peerage that described the Wimsey coat of arms. In it, Gerald is charged with murder. Gerald refuses to supply an alibi for himself, is tried by his peers, before the full House of Lords, and eventually acquitted through his brother's efforts. Gerald is characterized, in the words of Mary McGlynn (professor of English at the City University of New York), by his idiolect, his "crude word choices, chatty asides, illogical sequencing, and missing letters." Although in the words of his brother he is "a shocking ass", the character of Gerald is portrayed with a degree of sympathy, with his fictional uncle describing him as having "more sense of responsibility than I expected" and his reaction to Peter's marriage to Harriet being a favourable one.

Gerald's wife Helen, Duchess of Denver, is pilloried throughout the novels, and in the opinion of Eric Sandberg (professor of English at the City University of Hong Kong) is the least pleasant character in them short of the actual murderers themselves, and even some of the latter are portrayed more sympathetically than Helen Wimsey is. Her letter in the opening of Busman's Honeymoon presents her as completely misunderstanding the relationship between Peter and Harriet, and she repeatedly patronizes and insults Harriet according to entries from her mother-in-law's diary. Her angry reaction to Peter and Harriet evading her interference in their wedding is echoed in another character's description of her as "a tartar, very cross, and as stiff as a poker"; and a later backhanded compliment in the novel states that "To do her justice, I can't see she could have found anything nastier to say if she'd thought it out with both hands for a fortnight."

In The Attenbury Emeralds, written by Jill Paton Walsh in 2010 with the cooperation of Sayers' estate, Gerald dies in 1951 from a heart attack during a fire at Duke's Denver. Because his son, Viscount St. George (a fighter pilot), did not survive the Second World War, Lord Peter inherits the title.

The fictional estate of the duchy is Duke's Denver, with the ancestral home being Bredon Hall, situated east of the real village of Denver, Norfolk. In the first novel it is where Wimsey is taken by his mother for rest and recuperation, and Wimsey's description of it as a place where "things moved in an orderly way; no one died sudden and violent deaths except aged setters" gives it the dual in-universe/out-of-universe character of an escape from World War I and the relative modernity of city life as well as an escape from the genre of detective fiction. Wimsey with his wife Harriet returns there likewise for peace and quiet at the end of Busman's Honeymoon.

Colin Watson described Sayers as a "sycophantic bluestocking" in his Snobbery with Violence, but based upon the aforementioned portrayals of foolishness, snobbery, and outdatedness Eric Sandberg espoused the opposite view that "it would not be accurate to describe Sayers's depiction of the aristocracy as adulatory or sycophantic."

=== Wimsey Papers ===
Sayers published several articles and pamphlets on the Wimseys, including a series of The Wimsey Papers, the purported wartime letters of the family, which appeared in The Spectator between 1939-11-17 and 1940-01-19. Sayers used the Papers as a vehicle for various commentaries, putting them in the mouths of her characters, of her own; ranging from what to do during a blackout to putting the numbers on the sides of buses in order to reduce accidents.

== Collaboration with Scott-Giles ==
C. W. Scott-Giles, Fitzalan Pursuivant of Arms Extraordinary, wrote to Sayers in 1935, treating the novels mock-seriously; to which Sayers replied, playing along. In what Scott-Giles was later to describe as "our beautiful game," he and Sayers, later to be joined by Helen Simpson and Muriel St. Clare Byrne, constructed an elaborate backstory for the Duchy of Denver that they took as far back as the Middle Ages. In a 1937 essay, Sayers described this as "the Wimsey Industry."

As a group they produced a series of privately distributed pamphlets on the subject, and gave lectures, some of the ideas that they constructed even making it into Sayers's novel Busman's Honeymoon. One such pamphlet, for example, was on the 10th Duke of Denver, written in mock 18th century style by Sayers and Simpson and illustrated with the Wimsey coat of arms on the title page and a portrait of the fictional duke on its frontispiece by Scott-Giles and his wife.

Scott-Giles would later publish an edited version of his correspondence with Sayers in book form as The Wimsey Family. After her death, he published an article on Wimsey heraldry in Coat of Arms magazine, which subject inspired several letters to the editor of the magazine over several subsequent volumes.

== Others ==
Other fan-generated fictional genealogies and Wimsey family histories were published in Sayers Review, a magazine that was published in Los Angeles from the late 1970s to the early 1980s.
