= Lord Peter (short story collection) =

Collection of short stories

First edition (publ. Harper & Row)

Lord Peter is a collection of short stories featuring Lord Peter Wimsey. First published in 1972 (ISBN 0-380-01694-X), it includes all the short stories about Lord Peter written by Dorothy L. Sayers, most of which were published elsewhere soon after they were written, and some related writings.

== Contents ==
- Introduction, by James Sandoe
- Twelve stories which constituted Lord Peter Views the Body (1928)
  - "The Abominable History of the Man with Copper Fingers"
  - "The Entertaining Episode of the Article in Question"
  - "The Fascinating Problem of Uncle Meleager's Will"
  - "The Fantastic Horror of the Cat in the Bag"
  - "The Unprincipled Affair of the Practical Joker"
  - "The Undignified Melodrama of the Bone of Contention"
  - "The Vindictive Story of the Footsteps That Ran"
  - "The Bibulous Business of a Matter of Taste"
  - "The Learned Adventure of the Dragon's Head"
  - "The Piscatorial Farce of the Stolen Stomach"
  - "The Unsolved Puzzle of the Man with No Face"
  - "The Adventurous Exploit of the Cave of Ali Baba"
- Four stories from Hangman's Holiday (1933)
  - "The Image in the Mirror"
  - "The Incredible Elopement of Lord Peter Wimsey"
  - "The Queen's Square"
  - "The Necklace of Pearls"
- Two stories from In the Teeth of the Evidence (1939)
  - "In the Teeth of the Evidence"
  - "Absolutely Elsewhere"
- Three later stories also collected in Striding Folly (1972)
  - "Striding Folly"
  - "The Haunted Policeman"
  - "Talboys"
- Coda: "Sayers, Lord Peter and God", by Carolyn Heilbrun
- Codetta: "Greedy Night, A Parody", by E. C. Bentley

== Sources ==
- Sayers, Dorothy L. Lord Peter: A Collection of All the Lord Peter Wimsey Stories. New York: Harper & Row (ISBN 0060137886, ISBN 978-0-06-013787-8), 1972.
