= The Late Scholar =

2013 novel by Jill Paton Walsh

- First Edition
- Author: Jill Paton Walsh
- Language: English
- Series: Lord Peter Wimsey
- Genre: crime novel
- Publisher: Hodder & Stoughton
- Publication date: 5 December 2013 (UK) / 14 January 2014 (US/CAN)
- Publication place: United Kingdom
- Media type: Print (hardback & paperback)
- ISBN: 978-1-4447-5190-1
- Preceded by: The Attenbury Emeralds

The Late Scholar is the fourth and final Lord Peter Wimsey-Harriet Vane detective novel written by Jill Paton Walsh. Featuring characters created by Dorothy L. Sayers, it was written with the co-operation and approval of Sayers' estate. It was published by Hodder & Stoughton on 5 December 2013 in the UK, and on 14 January 2014 in North America.

== Plot summary ==
The Late Scholar features the former Lord Peter Wimsey—now the Duke of Denver—and his wife, the former Harriet Vane, and is set in a fictional Oxford college called St. Severin's. It is 1953, according to internal evidence within the text of the novel. For example, in Chapter 9, Harriet looks for an article published in 1948, because 'hadn't Gervase said it was five years ago?'. A book and a film which came out in 1953 are mentioned ('The Go-Between' in Chapter 3, and 'From Here to Eternity' in Chapter 13).

Wimsey discovers that, as Duke of Denver, he has inherited the position of Visitor of an Oxford college, St Severin's. The college is in financial difficulties, and is in the midst of an acrimonious dispute between the Fellows over whether or not to sell a valuable codex (a copy of The Consolation of Philosophy by Boethius, with glosses which may be by Alfred the Great) to finance the purchase of a piece of land which might be worth much money if planning permission can be obtained on it. The two sides are evenly balanced in numbers; two of the Fellows appeal to him to resolve the dispute, and before he has even arrived at Oxford, some of the Fellows turn up at his seat at Bredon Hall to try to convince him of the wisdom of either course of action.

Peter and Harriet quickly set off for Oxford. But the dispute turns out to be even worse than they had thought, with attempts (some successful) to murder some of the Fellows. The Warden has the casting vote, but he is nowhere to be found. And some of the successful and unsuccessful attacks resemble the murder methods in Peter's past cases—methods that Harriet has used in her published novels.

A side plot concerns the decision of Bredon, the elder son of Peter and Harriet, not to apply for admission to Oxford University—but instead to study estate management at Reading University. While far from stupid, Bredon is not as brilliant as his father, and at Oxford unfavourable comparisons would have been inevitable. Harriet realises that Bredon is not only the son of Peter, but also the nephew of Peter's brother Gerald—who was deeply attached to the land and to the cares of its daily management, in a way that Peter never was.

== Reception ==
Kirkus Reviews observes that solving the various mysteries and saving the college "takes patience and diligence for Peter and Harriet—and for readers who may fidget over the leisurely pace and the insulated academic setting in post-WWII Britain", and that "Walsh's ... respectful attempt to keep the franchise going will invite the scrutiny of Wimsey purists, and newcomers may find the Duke affected. Even so, many fans will eagerly welcome back their beloved sleuth and enjoy seeing Harriet hold her own in a thoughtfully constructed mystery."
