= Clouds of Witness =

1926 novel by Dorothy L. Sayers

- First edition
- Author: Dorothy L. Sayers
- Language: English
- Series: Lord Peter Wimsey
- Genre: Mystery novel
- Publisher: T. Fisher Unwin
- Publication date: 1926
- Publication place: United Kingdom
- Media type: Print
- Pages: 315
- ISBN: 0-06-080835-7
- OCLC: 14717530
- Dewey Decimal: 823/.912 19
- LC Class: PR6037.A95 C5 1987
- Preceded by: Whose Body?
- Followed by: Unnatural Death

Clouds of Witness is a 1926 mystery novel by Dorothy L. Sayers, the second in her series featuring Lord Peter Wimsey. In the United States the novel was first published in 1927 under the title Clouds of Witnesses.

It was adapted for television in 1972, as part of a series starring Ian Carmichael as Lord Peter.

== Plot ==
Lord Peter Wimsey's brother, the Duke of Denver, has taken a shooting lodge at Riddlesdale in Yorkshire. At 3 o'clock one morning, Captain Denis Cathcart, the fiancé of Wimsey's sister Lady Mary, is found shot dead just outside the conservatory. Mary, trying to leave the house at 3 am for a reason she declines to explain, finds Denver kneeling over Cathcart's body. Suspicion falls on Denver, as the lethal bullet had come from his revolver and he admits having quarrelled with Cathcart earlier, after receiving a letter informing him that Cathcart had been caught cheating at cards. He cannot produce the letter, and maintains that he stumbled across the body after returning from a walk on the moors, but will say no more.

Wimsey arrives to investigate, along with his friend Inspector Charles Parker, who will find himself becoming increasingly attracted to Lady Mary throughout the novel. They find a series of unidentified footprints and a discarded jewel in the form of a cat. It is clear that both Denver and Mary are hiding something: Denver refuses to budge from his story that he was simply out for a walk, while Mary is feigning illness to avoid talking to anyone.

Wimsey investigates several false leads. The footprints turn out to be those of Mary's secret fiancé, Goyles, a socialist agitator considered "an unsuitable match" by her family. He had crept into the grounds for a pre-arranged rendezvous at 3 am, when the couple had intended to elope. Mary assumed that he was the killer and has been covering for him, but when she learns that he had fled in terror after discovering the body, she breaks off their engagement in disgust at his cowardice.

Wimsey's investigations lead him to a violent local farmer, Grimethorpe, with a stunningly beautiful wife. Wimsey finds the lost letter that was sent to Denver wedged in the window of the Grimethorpes' bedroom, proving that Denver had been visiting Mrs Grimethorpe on the night of Cathcart's death. This is what he has refused to admit, being determined to shield his mistress even at the price of being wrongfully convicted of murder.

Eventually, the jewelled cat leads Wimsey to Cathcart's mistress of many years, who had left him for an American millionaire. Wimsey travels to New York to find her, makes a daring and dangerous transatlantic flight back to London, and arrives just in time to present his evidence at Denver's trial in the House of Lords. Wimsey brings a letter that Cathcart had written to his mistress on the night of his death. After hearing that she was leaving him, Cathcart had written back stating his intention to commit suicide. He had then taken Denver's revolver from the study and gone out into the garden to shoot himself. The confounding factor in the investigation had been the coincidence of Denver returning from Mrs Grimethorpe's, just in time to find the body, at the same time that Mary had emerged from the house for her rendezvous with Goyles.

Denver is acquitted. As he is leaving the House of Lords, Grimethorpe appears, shoots at him, flees, and is knocked down and killed by a passing taxi. Mrs Grimethorpe, finally free of her husband, declares that she has no interest in continuing her affair with Denver. In the final scene of the book, Inspector Sugg finds Wimsey, Parker, and a friend on the street after midnight, hopelessly drunk, celebrating the end of the case. Sugg assists them into cabs, and reflects, "Thank Gawd there weren't no witnesses."

== Title ==
The book's title derives from the Epistle to the Hebrews, chapter 12, verse 1: "Wherefore seeing we also are compassed about with so great a cloud of witnesses, let us lay aside every weight, and the sin which doth so easily beset us, and let us run with patience the race that is set before us."

== Literary significance and criticism ==
In his 2017 overview of the classic crime genre, Martin Edwards suggests that Clouds of Witness is the work of a novelist learning her craft, but that it displays the storytelling qualities that soon made Sayers famous. While this early portrayal of Wimsey verges on a caricature, Sayers sought to characterise him in greater depth in later novels. Edwards notes that in this novel Wimsey is portrayed not only as a great detective but also as a man of action, and he quotes part of the defence counsel's speech to the House of Lords, explaining Wimsey's transatlantic dash to attend the trial:

"My lords, at this moment this all-important witness is cleaving the air high above the wide Atlantic. In this wintry weather he is braving a peril which would appal any heart but his own and that of the world-famous aviator whose help he has enlisted, so that no moment may be lost in freeing his noble brother from this terrible charge. My lords, the barometer is falling."

Written in 1926, this imagined flight of a solo aviator, albeit with a passenger in this instance, preceded the actual accomplishment of Charles Lindbergh who achieved the solo feat a year later. Alcock and Brown, however, flying in tandem, had crossed the Atlantic non-stop in 1919.

A copy of Clouds of Witness was one of the volumes modified by Joe Orton and Kenneth Halliwell in their adulterations of library books from the Islington and Hampstead libraries in the early 1960s.

== Adaptations ==
In 1972 the novel was the subject of a BBC TV mini-series starring Ian Carmichael as Wimsey and Glyn Houston as Bunter.
