= The Attenbury Emeralds =

2010 novel by Jill Paton Walsh

- First Edition
- Author: Jill Paton Walsh
- Language: English
- Series: Lord Peter Wimsey
- Genre: crime novel
- Publisher: Hodder & Stoughton
- Publication date: 16 September 2010
- Publication place: United Kingdom
- Media type: Print (Hardback & Paperback)
- ISBN: 978-0-340-99572-3
- Preceded by: A Presumption of Death
- Followed by: The Late Scholar

The Attenbury Emeralds is the third Lord Peter Wimsey-Harriet Vane detective novel written by Jill Paton Walsh. Featuring characters created by Dorothy L. Sayers, it was written with the co-operation and approval of Sayers' estate. It was published by Hodder & Stoughton in September 2010.

== Plot summary ==
=== 1921 ===
The Attenbury Emeralds recounts how Lord Peter begins his hobby of amateur sleuthing in 1921 by becoming involved in the recovery of the Attenbury Emeralds. Lord Peter's "first case" is a mystery mentioned by Lord Peter's creator Dorothy L. Sayers in a number of novels, but until now never fully told.

The novel is set after World War II, but in its first chapters this seems like a mere frame story, with Wimsey recounting to his wife Harriet the reminiscences of the start of his detecting career in 1921. As a shell-shocked veteran of the First World War, the young Wimsey had been invited to an engagement party at the house of the Attenburys, another aristocratic family. He was present when an emerald family heirloom disappeared, and discovered in himself a talent for detection—leading to the discovery of the missing stone (and incidentally saving his friends' daughter from marrying a rogue).

=== 1951 ===
In 1951, however, the story is still not over. There is at least one similar emerald, linked by inscribed parts of a quotation from the Persian poet Hafez. An Indian Maharaja to whose ancestors the emeralds once belonged seeks to reunite them. A patient killer has over decades committed several murders for the sake of these emeralds.

(In Gaudy Night, Harriet had discovered a copy of Sir Thomas Browne's Religio Medici in Wimsey's pocket. When she questioned him about his tastes in literature he replied that it could just as easily have been "Hafiz [sic] or Horace".)

=== Succession to the dukedom ===
During Wimsey's investigation of the mystery, there is a drastic change in his life. To his chagrin, he is forced to take up the title and duties of the 17th Duke of Denver when his brother Gerald dies of a heart attack during a fire at Duke's Denver. In the fire, much of the historic building of Bredon Hall, with its imposing Elizabethan and Jacobean façade, has been destroyed. However, the fire is stopped when it reaches a sturdy, thick-walled Norman building. This was the Wimsey family's original medieval residence which had been covered up, incorporated into the later structure, and forgotten for centuries, but which at the critical moment has saved the house's east wing from the fire, including the library with its priceless old books. At Harriet's suggestion, the new Duke of Denver decides not to reconstruct the house as it was before the fire but to live in the remaining part—an "odd but charming, asymmetrical structure" which is quite big enough for the present-day family—and to plant a garden where the destroyed part of the house had stood.

Reviewer Margaret Copsewood suggested that losing 16th, 17th and 18th century additions and having to make do with the original Norman structure can be read as a metaphor for Britons having to adjust to the loss of their centuries-old Empire — a process taking place in the period in which the book is set
