= Janet Hitchman =

British writer

- Born: 5 July 1916; Mutford, Suffolk
- Died: 19 May 1980 (aged 63); Norwich, Norfolk
- Occupation: Writer

Janet Hitchman (5 July 1916 – 19 May 1980) was a British writer.

== Life ==
Hitchman was born Elsie May Fields to Margaret Ames, a seamstress. On her birth certificate, her father's name was left blank. When she located her birth certificate as an adult, she found penciled on the back "Frederick Burrows, deceased 27.9.1916." Throughout her childhood she was known as Elsie Burrows. Hitchman's mother was a widow, her father a young soldier who was killed less than three months after her birth. Her mother gave the child to an elderly couple Elsie knew only as Gran and Granfer Sparkes and died less than two years later. While growing up, Hitchman contracted mastoiditis.

Hitchman's childhood, which she recalled in her 1960 memoir, The King of the Barbareens, was spent being passed from foster home to foster home, along with stints in hospitals, a home for mentally handicapped women, and the Thomas Anguish Hospital School of Housecraft for Girls in Norwich. At fourteen, she was sent to Dr. Thomas John Barnardo's children's facility in Barkingside. Hitchman would later write an account of Barnardo's work, They Carried the Sword. While at Barnardo's, she gave herself the name Janet, adopted from Jane Eyre.

From Barnardo's, she was sent to a boarding house in London. She spent the next few years working a variety of jobs, ending up as a stage manager with a small theatre company. It was here she met her husband, Michael Hitchman. Together, they had a daughter, but in 1946 they divorced. Hitchman spent much of the next decade in a series of domestic jobs. She returned to Norfolk, where she lived for the rest of her life.

After the publication of The King of the Barbareens, she earned her living as a freelance writer, writing broadcast pieces for the BBC and articles and reviews for a variety of publications. She wrote one novel, Meeting for Burial, which was set in a Quaker community based on the one she had joined in Norwich.

She was commissioned to write a biography of Dorothy L. Sayers, but was hampered by the lack of access to Sayers' private papers and members of her family. Despite this, the book, Such a Strange Lady, received some good reviews. Writing in the New York Times, Louise Bernikow called it "awfully intelligent, compassionate, interesting and, as they say, a very good read." In The American Scholar, Carolyn Gold Heilbrun described it as "unsound, unfair and distressing".

Hitchman was working on a life of the author, Ouida, when she diagnosed with an inoperable cancer in 1978. In her last 18 months, she recorded a series of interviews for BBC producer Hallam Tennyson in which she talked about her coming death. The resulting piece, "The Fact of Death," was broadcast on BBC Radio 4 in December 1980.

== Books ==
- Hitchman, Janet (1960). The King of the Barbareens. London: Putnam. OCLC 314777531.
- Hitchman, Janet (1966). They carried the sword. London: Gollancz. OCLC 2572260.
- Hitchman, Janet (1968). Meeting for burial. New York: Atheneum. OCLC 448549.
- Hitchman, Janet (1976). Such a strange lady: a biography of Dorothy L. Sayers. New York: Avon. OCLC 1036868611.
