= Whose Body? =

1923 novel by Dorothy L. Sayers

- 1936 edition by Gollancz
- Author: Dorothy L. Sayers
- Language: English
- Series: Lord Peter Wimsey
- Genre: Mystery novel
- Publisher: T. Fisher Unwin
- Publication date: 1923
- Publication place: United Kingdom
- Media type: Print
- Pages: 287
- Followed by: Clouds of Witness

Whose Body? is a 1923 mystery novel by Dorothy L. Sayers first published in the UK by T. Fisher Unwin and in the US by Boni & Liveright. It was her debut novel, and the book in which she introduced the character of Lord Peter Wimsey. Clouds of Witness (1926) would be the next novel in which the character appears.

Initial reviews of the novel were largely positive, and later critics have continued to express admiration.

== Plot ==
Thipps, an architect, finds a dead body wearing nothing but a pair of pince-nez in the bath of his London flat. Lord Peter Wimsey—an aristocrat who has recently developed an interest in criminal investigation as a hobby—resolves to investigate the matter privately. Leading the official investigation is Inspector Sugg, who suggests that the body may be that of the famous financier Sir Reuben Levy, who disappeared from his bedroom in mysterious circumstances the night before. Sir Reuben's disappearance is in the hands of Inspector Charles Parker, a friend of Wimsey's. Although the body in the bath superficially resembles that of Sir Reuben, it quickly becomes clear that it is not him, and it appears that the cases may be unconnected. Wimsey joins Parker in his investigation.

Thipps's flat is near a teaching hospital, and Wimsey considers the possibility that the unexpected appearance of a body may have been the result of a practical joke perpetrated by one of the medical students. However, that is excluded by evidence given at the inquest by the respected surgeon and neurologist Sir Julian Freke, who states that there was no subject missing from his dissecting room.

A prostitute's chance encounter with Levy on the night of his disappearance, on the road leading to the hospital and to Sir Julian Freke's house next door, provides Wimsey with the clue that allows him to link the two cases. Freke maintains that he was being discreetly consulted by Levy about a medical problem, and that Levy left at about 10 pm. Freke's manservant reports that Freke was inexplicably taking a bath at about 3 o'clock the following morning, judging from the noise of the cistern.

Wimsey ultimately discovers that Freke had lured Sir Reuben to his house with the promise of some inside financial information, and had murdered him there. Freke smuggled the body out onto the roof under cover of the cistern noise, took it into the hospital, and substituted it for that of a pauper which had been donated for dissection by the local workhouse. He then visited Sir Reuben's home to stage his disappearance, returned, carried the pauper's body over the flat roofs of the nearby houses and placed it in Thipps' bath, entering via a bathroom window that had been left open. As a joke, he added a pair of pince-nez that had by chance come into his possession. Returning to the hospital, he prepared Sir Reuben's body for dissection, giving it to his medical students for that purpose the next day.

Freke unsuccessfully attempts to murder both Parker and Wimsey. When it becomes clear that his actions have been discovered, he prepares a written confession of his long-held desire for revenge: many years earlier, he had hoped to marry the woman who later became Lady Levy, but she had chosen Sir Reuben in preference to him. He had also wanted to substantiate his personal theory of mind – in which conscience, sense of responsibility and so on are merely "surface symptoms" which arise from physical irritation or damage to the tissues of the brain. As he completes the confession the police arrive to arrest him, just in time to prevent his suicide.

== Literary significance and criticism ==
Initial reviews of the novel in 1923 were largely positive. The New York Times said that “there seems to be no reason why the discerning, but by no means infallible, Lord Peter should not become one of the best-known and best-liked among the many amateur detectives of fiction”, while the New York Herald called the book "The best detective story we have read since we stopped regarding books purely as amusements”.

In their 1989 review of crime novels, the US writers Barzun and Taylor called the book "a stunning first novel that disclosed the advent of a new star in the firmament, and one of the first magnitude. The episode of the bum in the bathtub, the character (and the name) of Sir Julian Freke, the detection, and the possibilities in Peter Wimsey are so many signs of genius about to erupt. Peter alone suffers from fatuousness overdone, a period fault that Sayers soon blotted out."

A. N. Wilson, writing in 1993, noted that "The publisher made [Sayers] tone the story down, but the plot depends on Lord Peter being clever enough to spot that the body, uncircumcised, is not that of a Jew." In the 1923 text, Parker says that the body in the bath could not be Sir Reuben Levy because "Sir Reuben is a pious Jew of pious parents, and the chap in the bath obviously isn't ..." Later versions replaced this with "But as a matter of fact, the man in the bath is no more Sir Reuben Levy than Adolf Beck, poor devil, was John Smith".

In her introduction to Hodder & Stoughton's 2016 reprint, Laura Wilson argued that Wimsey, conceived as a caricature of the gifted amateur sleuth, owes something to P. G. Wodehouse, whose Bertie Wooster had made his first appearance some years earlier. Sayers said of Wimsey that "at the time I was particularly hard up and it gave me pleasure to spend his fortune for him. When I was dissatisfied with my single unfurnished room I took a luxurious flat for him in Piccadilly. ... I can heartily recommend this inexpensive way of furnishing to all who are discontented with their incomes."

In his 2017 overview of the classic crime genre, Martin Edwards said that Lord Peter Wimsey began his life as a fantasy figure, created "as a conscious act of escapism by young writer who was short of money and experiencing one unsatisfactory love affair after another".

In an article in The New York Times commemorating the novel's centenary in 2024, Sarah Weinman wrote that "What elevated Sayers's debut to the upper ranks of the genre was the quality of her prose and the sense that her sleuth had more emotional heft than he displayed." She considered that even after 100 years the story remains a pure pleasure to read.

== Adaptations ==
BBC Radio 4 produced a radio dramatisation starring Ian Carmichael as Lord Peter Wimsey and Patricia Routledge as his mother, the Dowager Duchess of Denver.
