= Mervyn Bunter =

Fictional character by Dorothy Sayers

- Lord Peter Wimsey character
- First appearance: Whose Body? (1923)
- Last appearance: The Late Scholar (2013)
- Created by: Dorothy L. Sayers
- Portrayed by: Aubrey Mather (film: 1937); J.B. Rowe (radio: 1939); Edgar Norfolk (radio: 1940); Seymour Hicks (film: 1940); Glyn Houston/Derek Newark (TV: 1972-75); Peter Jones (radio: 1973-83); William Eedle (radio: 1986); John Cater (radio: 1987); Richard Morant (TV: 1987); Stephen Critchlow (radio: 1999); Richard Attlee (radio: 2026)

In-universe information
- Gender: Male
- Occupation: Valet; Assistant amateur detective, Former WWI NCO
- Family: Meredith Bunter (brother); Six other siblings
- Spouse: Hope Fanshaw
- Nationality: British

Mervyn Bunter is a fictional character in Dorothy L. Sayers's novels and short stories. He serves as Lord Peter Wimsey's valet, having been Wimsey's batman during the First World War. Bunter was partially based on the fictional valet Jeeves, created by P. G. Wodehouse.

== Background ==
Sayers wrote a number of novels and short stories concerning the adventures of a fictional private detective called Lord Peter Wimsey, beginning with a Sexton Blake story she wrote in 1920.

The first Wimsey novel, Whose Body?, was published in 1923, and the last by Sayers alone, Busman's Honeymoon, was published in 1937. Further stories based on original material were published under the authorship of Sayers and Jill Paton Walsh, the last appearing in 2013. The original stories written by Sayers take place between 1921 and 1937; the continuation novels by Walsh extend through the Second World War and into the 1950s.

== Role ==
Mervyn Bunter is Wimsey's manservant. Sayers admitted having partially based Bunter's character on P. G. Wodehouse's Jeeves.

Bunter ensures that his master is dressed well. He is knowledgeable about cuisine, drinks, cigars, and social etiquette.

Bunter is solemn and dignified, with occasional understated sarcasm. He uses carefully correct and sometimes stilted English. He has a talent for music hall mimicry, and assists Wimsey in purchasing rare books and solving crimes.

== Characterisation ==
=== As a manservant ===
Bunter occupies a high social position among domestic staff owing to his role as a valet. He is referred to as "Mr Bunter" by all other servants and tradesmen. His dress sense and manners command respect from his colleagues and impress cooks and maids.

He possesses a calmness which is broken only two occasions. In The Nine Tailors Bunter becomes upset after a maid is caught polishing a beer bottle taken as evidence. In Busman's Honeymoon, he becomes furious when Mrs Ruddle stands all the bottles upright and washes them.

=== As assistant detective ===
Bunter regularly assists in deduction, undertaking tasks not suitable for a lord. He possesses a wide-angled lens and a spy camera in his pocket, and photographs crime scenes and fingerprints. He also follows suspects and checks alibis.

=== With Lord Peter Wimsey and Harriet Vane ===
Sergeant Bunter was Major Wimsey's batman during the Great War. They served in the Rifle Brigade. In autumn 1918 Wimsey was buried in a dugout by a shell and was rescued by Bunter, among others. Bunter has saved Wimsey's life several times, notably from a bog in Yorkshire.

Immediately after the war Bunter took up service with Wimsey. Wimsey was afflicted with shell shock and Bunter devoted himself to his recovery. Bunter seems to have no interests other than serving Wimsey; he is even ready to give up marriage rather than leave.

In Strong Poison, Wimsey begins a courtship with Harriet Vane, which eclipses Bunter's role in the story. Wimsey is relieved when Bunter accepts Vane. Bunter is consoled when Wimsey turns to him instead of to Vane for assistance in a case. At the end of the case, Bunter and Vane join forces to save Wimsey.

== Fictional biography ==
1850: Birth of Bunter's mother, who lived at least until 1936; his father died earlier. The family was religious: Bunter quotes from the Bible and attends Church of England services; he is High Church.

c. 1880–1889: Bunter is born in Kent; one of seven, including a brother called Meredith.

c. 1885–1894: At age 5 he moves to London.

1914: Bunter is head footman in the house of Sir John Sanderton. He learns housekeeping skills in this household. Bunter joins the Rifle Brigade, presumably as a volunteer, and is posted to France. His social position allows him to rise no higher than sergeant.

1918: In October Wimsey, with Bunter now his batman, moves into the trenches of Caudry. Within a few weeks Wimsey is buried in a dugout by shell fire and Bunter is among those who rescue him.

1919: In January Bunter appears at the Wimseys' ducal residence to serve him.

1920: To assist Wimsey's recovery, Bunter finds a modern flat in Piccadilly. As well as having a small apartment for photography and chemistry, Bunter is paid £200 per year.

1921: Wimsey and Bunter become involved in their first investigation, which concerns the Attenbury Jewels. This case is mentioned several times but never described until The Attenbury Emeralds.

1921: Bunter assists a doctor friend of Wimsey's with his photographic skills, then helps to solve a murder. The doctor invites Bunter to join them at lunch; Bunter refuses.

1922–23: The first major investigation. Bunter is on holiday with Wimsey, has allowed Wimsey to go unwashed and unshaven and is photographing scenery instead of fingerprints. On their return Wimsey refers to Bunter having had "a regular affair with an inn-keeper's daughter". Bunter sees newspaper items referring to the Duke of Denver's arrest, and they return by air to Yorkshire. Wimsey strays into a bog, and Bunter saves his life. Bunter attends the trial of the duke in Westminster Hall.

c. 1923: Bunter works in the background of the events of "The Abominable History of the Man with Copper Fingers", set in America.

1923–26: Bunter takes photos of suspects in Paris using a small camera hidden in his breast pocket. On the boat back to England he develops the photos in the cabin. Bunter helps to hold and disarm a female impersonator. Bunter helps Wimsey solve a crossword problem and find a missing will. In The Unprincipled affair of the Practical Joker, Bunter stays at a hotel with Wimsey, but has no part in the story. In The Learned Adventure of the Dragon’s Head, Bunter assists in capturing burglars, but has no part in finding the treasure.

1927: In Unnatural Death, Bunter's photographic skills provide a vital clue to a double identity.

1928: The events of The Unpleasantness at the Bellona Club occur.

1929: In The Adventurous Exploit of the Cave of Ali Baba, a decoy will leaves £500 per annum to Bunter, plus the lease of the flat in Piccadilly, but Bunter does not appear in the story.

c. 1929: In Absolutely Elsewhere, Bunter is heard on the telephone helping to show how an alibi was faked.

1930: In Strong Poison, Harriet Vane is introduced, and Bunter realises that Lord Peter has fallen in love. Bunter's liaison with a domestic staff member is a major help in proving that a mysterious powder is arsenic.

1931: In The Five Red Herrings, Bunter is living with Wimsey in a Kirkcudbrightshire cottage. He takes a local maid to the cinema, getting her to speak about her employer's secrets. He receives little mention, however, and is not included in the reconstruction of the crime. In Have His Carcase, Bunter appears very little. He is allowed to carry out a difficult piece of surveillance. In "The Incredible Elopement of Lord Peter Wimsey", Wimsey travels by train with Bunter and asks him to get the train staff to open up the commissariat and secure food for Langley.

1932: In "The Queen's Square", at a country house Christmas party attended by Wimsey, Bunter assists with the refreshments. After a murder, Bunter and Wimsey take a number of photographs which are developed in the cellar. Bunter's explanation of the effects of light enables Wimsey to solve the crime. In Murder Must Advertise, there is only one reference to Bunter.

1933: In The Nine Tailors, Bunter plays a significant role, serving as valet and assistant investigator. The servant Emily upsets Bunter by wiping fingerprints from a beer bottle. When the village is flooded, Bunter acts as butler for the whole parish, including his music hall impressions.

1934: In Gaudy Night, Bunter plays a minor part. He is allowed to use his camera and find a hairpin.

1935: In Busman's Honeymoon, Bunter prepares Wimsey and his nephew for Wimsey's wedding. He takes part in the subterfuge which whisks the couple away from reporters afterwards. He deals with the strange circumstances surrounding their arrival at Talboys and efficiently sets up a support group over which he presides. He also hires a number of animals to scare off reporters. The housekeeper provokes an outburst from him when she washes the bottles of Cockburn '96 port. Bunter is almost overwhelmed when Wimsey turns to him, not his new wife, for help. Bunter and Vane together help Wimsey at the execution of the murderer.

1936–37: In Thrones, Dominations, Bunter is in service to Vane and Wimsey in their London house, with his brother Meredith as butler. Bunter is called upon to assist in an investigation. He uses his camera at the scene of the crime and discovers a blocked sink; he goes to France with Wimsey on a diplomatic mission concerning the new king Edward VIII. Bunter marries professional photographer Hope Fanshaw. They have a son, Peter Meredith, born December 1937.

1940: In A Presumption of Death, Vane moves with her children from London to Talboys at Paggleham, Hertfordshire. Bunter accompanies Wimsey on secret missions in Europe. He returns without Wimsey and resumes service with Vane. His wife, Hope, is working on aerial reconnaissance at Lopsley Manor; their son is with her parents in Evesham. Bunter attempts to rejoin the services, but is too old and instead takes part in organising the local Home Guard unit; he makes pellets for their shotguns. Bunter makes himself quarters in the attic. After Wimsey's return, he becomes involved in the death of a spy. He visits his son and in-laws in Evesham, and a friend in Gloucester. He deals in the country black market for the family.

1941: Hope's studio is blitzed, so the Bunters rent a cottage in Paggleham near Talboys.

1942: In "Talboys", Bunter is only mentioned as a servant who sleeps in the attic. The last words of the story refer to "Bunter who knew everything without asking."

== In popular culture ==
In the 1998 horror novel Bag of Bones by Stephen King, Bunter is the name given to the moose head that sits over the fireplace of main character Mike Noonan's vacation house.

== Reception ==
Bunter has been described as resembling P. G. Wodehouse's Jeeves. A perfect manservant and a detective's assistant, he has been said to be more intelligent then Holmes' Watson.
