= The Wimsey Papers =

1939 Spectator articles by Dorothy Sayers

The Wimsey Papers are a series of articles by Dorothy L. Sayers published between November 1939 and January 1940 in The Spectator. They had the form of letters exchanged by members of the Wimsey family and other characters familiar to readers of the Lord Peter Wimsey detective novels; but the articles were intended to convey Sayers's opinions and commentaries on various aspects of public life in the early months of the Second World War.

== Content ==
The topics covered include such matters as blackout, evacuation, rationing and the need for the public to take personal responsibility rather than wait for the government to guide them. The subjects range from very practical and detailed advice ranging from such issues as how pedestrians can avoid being hit by cars in the blackout to quite Utopian and far-reaching schemes for the post-war reconstruction of Britain.

The letters also expressed Sayers's displeasure with the appeasement policies of Neville Chamberlain in the previous years, and her doubts about his fitness to lead Britain in war (at the time of writing, it was not yet known that Chamberlain would soon be replaced by Winston Churchill). The papers also attributed to Harriet Vane a reluctance to go on writing murder mysteries at the time when European dictators were committing mass murders openly and with impunity. This seems to have been Sayers's own feeling, as she in fact abandoned during World War II the writing of murder mysteries and never took it up again.

There is a repeated unfavorable opinion of the Soviet Union, in the aftermath of the Molotov–Ribbentrop Pact and the Soviet attack on Finland. The opinion that there was little to choose between communism and fascism, and that the two kinds of dictatorship are equally reprehensible, is given special prominence by being attributed to Lord Peter Wimsey himself. Other characters are shown as expressing the opinion that, even had Britain managed to conclude an alliance with the Soviet Union in 1939, the Soviets would have proven an unreliable ally of little military worth, given their army's weak performance in Finland. On this point Sayers' opinion, like that of most other Britons, did not change in 1941. Getting the Soviets on Britain's side was highly welcome, but the lamentable performance and mass surrenders of the Red Army seemed to bear out the negative assessment. It was only in 1942, when the Germans lost an Army at Stalingrad and American supplies started flowing in, that the resiliency and true strength of Russia became apparent.

The papers do provide some significant new details about Wimsey's character, in particular the ironic epitaph he writes for himself when setting out for a dangerous mission behind enemy lines: Here lies an anachronism in the vague expectation of eternity. They also show that in addition to his thorough knowledge of the classics of English literature, Wimsey is familiar – though in fundamental disagreement – with the works of Karl Marx, and well able to debate with Marxists on their home ground.

== Later reuse ==
Some of the letters included in The Wimsey Papers were used by Jill Paton Walsh as the preface for her own novel A Presumption of Death, an authorized sequel continuing the Wimsey series where Sayers left it off. The letters provided much information which Walsh used in the book: Peter Wimsey and his servant Bunter being on a secret mission abroad, Harriet Vane taking her own children and those of her sister-in-law Mary to the country house Talboys in Hertfordshire, Peter's nephew Jerry an RAF combat pilot, and the unsympathetic Duchess Helen working at the Ministry of Instruction and Morale (about whose work Sayers was rather disparaging). The village dance and air raid practice, which are the starting point for the plot of A Presumption of Death, are also derived from one of Sayers' fictional letters, though the idea of making this the scene of a murder to be investigated was Walsh's.

== Availability ==
Other than the selection made by Walsh and incorporated in her book, The Wimsey Papers have never been republished. In the Author's Note appended to A Presumption of Death, Walsh cautioned the eager Wimsey fans that "The Wimsey Papers are not fiction, and were not intended to be read in a continuous chunk" and that "Some of them are about details of war-time history that would now require extensive footnotes in explication". Nevertheless, one such fan made the effort to retype them from archive copies of The Spectator and make them available online (see External Links). "The Wimsey Papers" are now available as a Kindle ebook from Amazon.
