= Have His Carcase =

1932 mystery novel by Dorothy L. Sayers

- First edition
- Author: Dorothy L. Sayers
- Language: English
- Series: Lord Peter Wimsey
- Genre: Mystery Novel
- Publisher: Victor Gollancz
- Publication date: 1932
- Publication place: United Kingdom
- Media type: Print
- Pages: 448
- Preceded by: The Five Red Herrings
- Followed by: Murder Must Advertise

Have His Carcase is a 1932 locked-room mystery by Dorothy L. Sayers, her seventh novel featuring Lord Peter Wimsey and the second in which Harriet Vane appears. The book marks a stage in the long drawn out courting of Harriet Vane by Wimsey. Though working closely with him on solving the book's mystery, she still refuses to marry him.

== Plot ==
During a hiking holiday on the South West coast of England, the detective novelist Harriet Vane discovers the body of a man lying on an isolated rock on the shore, not far from the resort of Wilvercombe; his throat has been cut. Harriet takes photographs and collects items she finds on and around the body, including a distinctive razor. The man's blood is still liquid, from which it is concluded that he died shortly before she arrived at 2:00 pm. There are no footprints in the sand other than hers and those of the victim. Unfortunately, the corpse is washed away by the rising tide before she can summon help.

Alerted to the discovery by a friend, Lord Peter Wimsey arrives, and he and Harriet start their investigations. The victim is identified as Paul Alexis, a young man of Russian extraction, employed by a Wilvercombe hotel as a professional dancing partner. The police tend to the view that Alexis' death was suicide and that he had cut his own throat. Wimsey traces the razor Harriet found with the body to an out-of-work hairdresser, Mr Bright, who says that he sold the razor to Alexis the night before Alexis's death.

Alexis was engaged to a rich widow in her fifties, Mrs Weldon. Her son, Henry Weldon, ten years older than his mother's lover and by all appearances a simple and brutish man, is appalled at the prospect of his mother's remarriage to a gigolo, and at his potential loss of inheritance. He travels to Wilvercombe to monitor the investigation while ostensibly comforting his mother after her loss. Weldon appears to be a likely murder suspect, especially after Harriet recognizes him as a tourist she saw camping near the shore on the day of Alexis's death. He admits to having been in the area in disguise on that day, but he has an alibi for 2:00 pm.

Staged to look like suicide, Alexis' death is gradually revealed to be the result of an ingenious murder plot that played upon Alexis' fantasies. Wimsey and Harriet discover that in the period leading up to his death Alexis, an avid reader of Ruritanian romances, believed himself to be a descendant of Tsar Nicholas I of Russia. A series of encoded letters received from an unknown source convinced him that he was being called to return to Russia to take his place as the new rightful Tsar. He was lured to the rock by his anonymous correspondent, who urged him to be ready to meet a "Rider from the Sea", who it was said would be carrying instructions for his journey to Warsaw. Once at the rock, Alexis met his death at the hand of the murderer, who had ridden his horse along the beach through the incoming tide to avoid leaving tracks. The problem remains that no horse or rider was seen in the vicinity around 2:00 pm; however, a nearby neighbour reports having heard a horse pass by around noon.

Wimsey, Harriet, and Wimsey's valet Bunter ultimately discover that "Mr Bright" is actually a friend of Weldon's and the husband of one of the key witnesses for Weldon's movements during the day, and had played a part in convincing Alexis of his royal lineage. Weldon's alibi remains secure for the believed time of death, 2:00 pm; however, Wimsey infers that Alexis suffered from the blood-clotting disorder haemophilia (a disorder known to have affected the Russian royal family), resulting in his blood remaining liquid for much longer than would normally be expected — meaning he could have died hours earlier than supposed. Weldon and his co-conspirators are undone by their unsuccessful attempts to reshuffle their alibis to match the new information about the time of death, and by proof of their actual friendship.

Even as Wimsey and Harriet solve the case, Mrs Weldon has already moved on to another gigolo at the hotel, a sympathetic French dancer named Antoine.

== Title ==
The novel's title appears in William Cowper's translation of Book II of Homer's Iliad: "The vulture's maw / Shall have his carcase, and the dogs his bones". The phrase also appears a number of times in The Pickwick Papers by Charles Dickens, as Sam Weller's distortion of the legal term habeas corpus.

== Characters ==
- Lord Peter Wimsey: protagonist, aristocratic amateur detective
- Miss Harriet Vane: protagonist, detective novelist with whom Wimsey is in love
- Paul Alexis (deceased): professional dancing partner at a hotel
- Mrs Weldon: elderly wealthy widow, engaged to Alexis
- Henry Weldon: only son of Mrs Weldon
- Haviland Martin: suspicious camper who proves hard to trace
- Julian Perkins: London schoolteacher who mysteriously disappears
- William Bright: itinerant hairdresser with a cloudy past
- Mr Alfred Morecambe: London commission agent
- Mrs Morecambe: actress, wife of Alfred
- Inspector Umpelty: local policeman in charge of the investigation
- Mervyn Bunter: Lord Peter's gentleman's gentleman.
- Mrs Lefranc: Paul Alexis' landlady
- Esdras Pollock: surly local fisherman with something to hide

== Chapter heads ==
All the chapter heads feature quotations from the works of the dramatist and poet Thomas Lovell Beddoes.

== Criticism ==
In their overview A Catalogue of Crime (1971/89) Barzun & Taylor noted that the book was "A great achievement, despite some critics' carping. The people, the motive, the cipher, and the detection are all topnotch. Here, too, is the first (and definitive) use of hemophilia as a misleading fact. And surely the son, the mother, and her self-deluded gigolo are definitive types".

== Adaptations ==
The novel was adapted for radio in 1981 for BBC Radio 4 by Alistair Beaton, starring Ian Carmichael as Lord Peter and Maria Aitken as Harriet Vane.

It was adapted for television in 1987, as part of a series starring Edward Petherbridge as Lord Peter and Harriet Walter as Harriet Vane. Mervyn Bunter is played by Richard Morant, the brother of Angela Morant who portrays the character Mrs Morecambe. The police officer in charge, Inspector Trethowan in this adaptation, is played by Ray Armstrong.
