= Lord Peter Wimsey (radio series) =

BBC radio series, 1973–1983

- Genre: Radio drama
- Country of origin: United Kingdom
- Home station: BBC Radio 4
- Starring: Ian Carmichael; Peter Jones
- Written by: Chris Miller; Peter Jones; Tania Lieven; Alistair Beaton; Michael Bakewell; Adapted from the works of Dorothy L. Sayers
- Directed by: Simon Brett; Martin Fisher; Enyd Williams
- Original release: 30 December 1973 – 24 June 2010
- Opening theme: "When Day is Done" by Paul Whiteman and His Concert Orchestra ("Rain or Shine" by The London West End Orchestra for Gaudy Night)

Lord Peter Wimsey is a series of full cast BBC Radio drama adaptations of Dorothy L. Sayers's Lord Peter Wimsey detective novels broadcast on BBC Radio 4 between 1973 and 1983, with a further adaptation of Gaudy Night mounted for BBC Audiobooks in 2005 to complete the full sequence of Sayers' novels, all starring Ian Carmichael in the title role.

== Cast and crew ==
The series stars Ian Carmichael as aristocratic sleuth Lord Peter Wimsey. Carmichael played the role concurrently in five BBC Television adaptations beginning with Clouds of Witness in April 1972. Peter Jones played Wimsey's loyal valet and assistant Mervyn Bunter in all original adaptations, and also dramatised Clouds of Witness with Tania Lieven. Gabriel Woolf featured as Inspector Charles Parker, Lord Peter's friend and contact at Scotland Yard (later brother-in-law) in three adaptations. Mystery writer Harriet Vane was played by Ann Bell (Strong Poison), Maria Aitken (Have His Carcase) and Sarah Badel (Busman's Honeymoon) in the original sequence and Joanna David in Gaudy Night.

The first six productions were directed by Simon Brett, who became a crime writer himself following his involvement with the series, with the next four directed by Martin Fisher. Gaudy Night, missing from the original sequence, was directed for BBC Audiobooks in 2005 by Enyd Williams and was later broadcast on BBC Radio 7 in 2010.

== List of adaptations ==
No.	Title	First broadcast	Notes
1	Whose Body?	30 December 1973	5 episodes adapted by Chris Miller, directed by Simon Brett.
2	Clouds of Witness	3 February 1974	8 episodes adapted by Peter Jones and Tania Lieven, directed by Simon Brett.
3	Unnatural Death	5 May 1975	7 episodes adapted by Chris Miller, directed by Simon Brett.
4	The Unpleasantness at the Bellona Club	23 June 1975	6 episodes adapted by Chris Miller, directed by Simon Brett.
5	Strong Poison	17 May 1976	6 episodes adapted by Chris Miller, directed by Simon Brett.
6	The Five Red Herrings	4 January 1978	8 episodes adapted by Chris Miller, directed by Simon Brett.
7	Murder Must Advertise	1 January 1979	6 episodes adapted by Alistair Beaton, directed by Martin Fisher.
8	The Nine Tailors	20 October 1980	8 episodes adapted by Alistair Beaton, directed by Martin Fisher.
9	Have His Carcase	21 October 1981	6 episodes adapted by Alistair Beaton, directed by Martin Fisher.
10	Busman's Honeymoon	3 January 1983	6 episodes adapted by Alistair Beaton, directed by Martin Fisher.
11	Gaudy Night	18 June 2010	5 episodes adapted by Michael Bakewell, directed by Enyd Williams. Originally produced for BBC Audiobooks in 2005, first broadcast on BBC Radio 7 in 2010.

== Reception ==
Caroline Crampton reviewing a 2016 repeat of Have His Carcase in the New Statesman notes that "Ian Carmichael is Peter Wimsey...Somehow, the Hull-born Carmichael inhabits the character of Wimsey – the Eton and Oxford educated younger son of a Duke who turns to mystery-solving after traumatic experiences in the First World War – better than any of the others who tried over the course of the twentieth century...Just as Wimsey’s buffoonish, aristocratic utterances conceal a vulnerable, perceptive intellect, so does the old-fashioned style of this drama hide a darker, more difficult story." David Hepworth in The Guardian notes that Carmichael "was put on this earth to play two great heroes of popular fiction: Bertie Wooster and Lord Peter Wimsey."

Director and producer Simon Brett credits the series with inspiring him to become a crime novelist and his actor-sleuth character Charles Paris. He recalls:

I was delegated to produce a series of adaptations...Ian Carmichael had just played the part on television and they wanted him to reprise the character on radio. Up until then, although I'd written four very proper unpublished novels, I’d been rather scared of crime fiction. I thought you had to have a computerised brain to work out the plots. But working with Chris Miller, the writer who adapted the books, I made some very encouraging discoveries. First, we found some gaping holes in Sayers' plots. And, also, although the plot was important, character and dialogue were at least as important. That realisation, together with the fact that on the Wimseys I was working with a lot of middle-aged actors, led to the birth of Charles Paris.

== See also ==
- Lord Peter Wimsey (TV series)
- Hercule Poirot (radio series)
- Miss Marple (radio series)
- Sherlock Holmes (1989 radio series)
