= Ian Carmichael on stage, screen and radio =

English actor

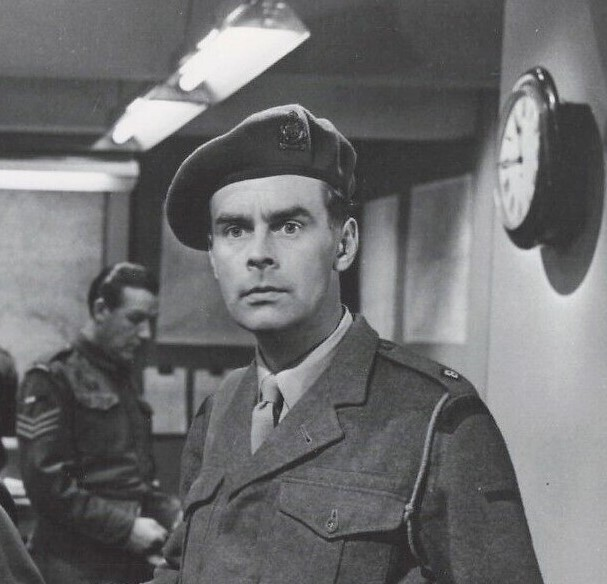
Carmichael in Private's Progress (1956)

The English actor and comedian Ian Carmichael OBE (1920–2010) performed in many mediums of light entertainment, including theatre, radio, television and film. His career spanned from 1939 until his death in 2010. According to Brian McFarlane, writing for The Encyclopedia of British Film, Carmichael "epitomises the good-natured, undemanding pleasures of '50s British cinema".

Carmichael made his professional stage debut in 1939 while he was studying at the Royal Academy of Dramatic Art; his role was as a robot in the science fiction play R.U.R., which lasted for only a week. His studies were interrupted by the Second World War, and he was commissioned into the Royal Armoured Corps; he also joined an entertainment unit, 30 Corps Theatrical Pool, for which he produced twenty shows. At the end of the war he returned to professional acting, and in 1947 he took a role in She Wanted a Cream Front Door, which ran in the West End for nine months. He continued to perform in the theatre throughout the rest of his career, largely in the United Kingdom, but also in productions in Canada, South Africa and the United States. In 1947 Carmichael made his debut on television in the revue New Faces. He continued to work in television throughout his life and, according to McFarlane, achieved considerable success with P. G. Wodehouse's The World of Wooster in 1966–1967, in which he played Bertie Wooster, and as Lord Peter Wimsey between 1972 and 1975.

Carmichael made his radio debut in 1947 in the BBC Home Service's Saturday Night Theatre, and continued to appear throughout his career. Included in his output were dramatisations of the Wimsey novels and Wodehouse's works, this time as Galahad Threepwood in the Blandings Castle stories. In 1948 Carmichael made his cinematic debut in an uncredited role in Bond Street, and went on to establish a film career in the 1950s when he appeared in films by the Boulting brothers, including Private's Progress (1956), Lucky Jim (1957), Brothers in Law (1957), Happy Is the Bride (1958) and I'm All Right Jack (1959). On Carmichael's death in 2010 Dennis Barker, writing for The Guardian, observed that "what made Carmichael notable was that he could play fool parts in a way that did not cut the characters completely off from human sympathy: a certain dignity was always maintained."

== Stage credits ==
Stage credits of Ian Carmichael
Production	Date	Theatre (London, unless stated)	Role	Notes	Refs.
R.U.R.	1939	People's Palace, Mile End	Robot	One week only	
A Midsummer Night's Dream	1 September 1939	Jerwood Vanbrugh Theatre, RADA	Francis Flute	Two productions only (Note: The play's run was closed when RADA was shut down because of the outbreak of the Second World War.)	
Julius Caesar	29 November 1939	Embassy Theatre	Claudius		
Nine Sharp	June – August 1940	Touring	–	Ten-week tour	
Springtime for Henry	1942	Army theatre, Duncombe Park	–	Four performances; informal army production	
Between Ourselves	1947	–	–		
She Wanted a Cream Front Door	February 1947	Apollo Theatre	Teddy Dyeswood		
I Said To Myself	July 1947	Mercury Theatre	Jean		
Cupid and Mars	3 October 1947	Arts Theatre	Christopher Mackintosh	Four-week production	
Out of the Frying Pan	6 December 1947	Q Theatre	Norman Reese		
What Goes On	21 December 1947	Players' Theatre	–	Revue	
Tomorrow is a Lovely Day	1948	Touring	–	Five-week tour	
The Lagoon Follies	July 1948	Jolly Roger Theatre, Clacton	–	Revue	
What Goes On	16 November 1948	Players' Theatre	–	Revue	
The Lilac Domino	March – 9 September 1949	Touring	Norman	24-week tour	
Wild Violets	25 October 1949 – 27 May 1950	Stoll Theatre	Otto Bergmann		
The Lyric Revue	24 May – 22 September 1951	Lyric Theatre, Hammersmith	–	Revue; four-week pre-London tour; production transferred to the Globe Theatre from 26 September 1951 to 28 June 1952	
The Globe Revue	10 July 1952 – 31 January 1953	Globe Theatre	–	Revue; two-week tour prior to the Globe	
High Spirits	13 May – 29 August 1953	Hippodrome	–	Revue; 16-week run	
At the Lyric	23 December 1953 – 15 May 1954	Lyric Theatre, Hammersmith	–	Revue	
Going to Town	20 May 1954 – 17 July 1954	St Martin's Theatre	–	Revue	
Simon and Laura	25 November 1954 – 28 May 1955	Strand Theatre	David Prentice		
The Tunnel of Love	December 1957 – August 1958	Her Majesty's Theatre	Augie Poole	Preceded by five-week provincial tour	
The Love Doctor	27 August – October 1959	Manchester Opera House, Manchester	The Tramp	Transferred to the Piccadilly Theatre on 12 October 1959 for two weeks before closing	
The Gazebo	29 March 1960 – 28 January 1961	Savoy Theatre	Elliott Nash		
Critic's Choice	6 December 1961 – May 1962	Vaudeville Theatre	Parker Ballentyne		
Devil May Care	March 1963	Strand Theatre	Nicholas	Four-week tour preceded the Strand; ran at the Strand for nine weeks	
Sunday in New York	1963	Ashcroft Theatre, Croydon	–		
March Hares	March 1964	Touring	Victor Hood		
Boeing-Boeing	2 February 1965	Cort Theatre, New York	Richard	Short tour of New Haven, CT and Boston, MA prior to New York; ran at the Cort for three weeks	
Say Who You Are	August 1965	Yvonne Arnaud Theatre, Guildford	David Lord	Production transferred to Her Majesty's Theatre in October 1965	
Getting Married	19 April 1967	Strand Theatre	Sir John Hotchkiss	Five-week tour preceded the Strand	
I Do! I Do!	16 May – 24 August 1968	Lyric Theatre, Hammersmith	Michael		
Birds on the Wing	1969	O'Keefe Centre, Toronto	–		
Darling I'm Home	1972	Touring, South Africa	–		
Springtime for Henry	August 1974	Oxford Playhouse	Mr Dewlip		
Out on a Limb!	October 1976	Vaudeville Theatre	Graham		
Overheard	May 1981	Theatre Royal, Haymarket, London	Christopher Caulker	Short run at Richmond Theatre before transferring to the Haymarket.	
Pride and Prejudice	1987–88	Theatre Royal, York	Mr Bennet	Production went on a national tour after the Theatre Royal	
The Circle	1989–90	Touring	Lord Porteus		
The School for Scandal	June 1995	Chichester Festival Theatre	Sir Peter Teazle		

== Radio broadcasts ==
Radio broadcasts of Ian Carmichael
Broadcast	Date	Role	Notes	Refs.
Saturday Night Theatre: "Mile Away Murder"	14 June 1947	Dick Elsted		
Saturday Night Theatre: "Of Mice and Men"	5 February 1949	Curley the Boss's son		
Gordon Grantley, KC	16 May 1949	Lieutenant Schulze		
Midday Music Hall	12 March 1954	Compere		
Radio Theatre: "Ring For Jeeves"	13 February 1955	Lord William Rowcester		
The Laughtermakers: "The Art of Ian Carmichael"	12 April 1957	Interviewee		
Woman's Hour	9 October 1957	Interviewee		
Desert Island Discs	7 April 1958	Interviewee (Note: His selection was Gene Kelly, "Les Girls" – Bing Crosby, "Prisoner of Love" – Fred Astaire, "Let's Kiss and Make Up" – The London Palladium Orchestra, playing a selection from Lilac Domino – Glenn Miller Orchestra, "Moonlight Serenade" – Kay Thompson, "How Deep Is the Ocean?" – Waltz from Act one of Pyotr Ilyich Tchaikovsky's Swan Lake; Philharmonia Orchestra, with Herbert von Karajan conducting – Frank Sinatra, "I've Got the World on a String". His luxury items were writing materials and beer.)		
Eric Barker and Pearl Hackney are Hosts Gown at 'Barker's Folly'	11 March 1959	–		
Evelyn Laye introduces 'On Stage, Everybody!'	15 May 1960	–		
Ian Carmichael says Everything Happens to Me and has the records to prove It	28 August – 25 September 1961	–	Five episodes	
London Mirror	9 December 1961	–		
Variety Playhouse	17 November 1962	–		
Play It Cool	5 August – 1 September 1964	–	With Hugh Paddick and Joan Sims, plus music from Rosemary Squires, The Mike Sammes Singers and the Ken Thorne Orchestra	
Woman's Hour	19 November 1964	Guest		
Going Places	9 May 1966	Leader		
Call My Bluff	20 October 1966	Panellist		
Housewives' Choice	3 – 7 July 1967	–	Five episodes	
A Play For Tuesday: "A Day in Bed"	8 August 1967	Jacob Slade		
Charades	22 April 1970	Panellist		
The Clever Stupid Game	13 June 1970	Panellist		
Sounds Familiar	23 July 1971	Panellist		
Be My Guest	12 August 1971	Presenter		
Blast of Spring	5 October – 9 November 1971	Prosper Spring	Six episodes	
The Great Musicals	3 July – 14 August 1973	Presenter	Seven episodes	
Just a Minute	24 September 1973	Panellist		
Lord Peter Wimsey: Whose Body?	30 December 1973 – 27 January 1974	Lord Peter Wimsey	Five episodes	
Lord Peter Wimsey: Clouds of Witness	3 February – 24 March 1974	Lord Peter Wimsey	Eight episodes	
Just a Minute	19 June 1974	Panellist		
The Great Musicals	2 July – 27 August 1974	Presenter	Nine episodes	
Wodehouse on Broadway	23 March 1975	Presenter		
Lord Peter Wimsey: Unnatural Death	5 May – 16 June 1975	Lord Peter Wimsey	Seven episodes	
Good Morning Everyone	25 – 29 August 1975	Presenter		
Ian Carmichael's Music Night	30 September 1975 – 13 July 1976	Presenter		
Percival and Apple	5 – 9 January 1976	Reader	Five episodes	
The Small, Intricate Life of Gerald C. Potter	22 March – 8 June 1976	Gerald C. Potter	Eight episodes	
am with A.J.	19 – 23 April 1976	Reader	Five episodes	
Lord Peter Wimsey: Strong Poison	17 May – 21 June 1976	Lord Peter Wimsey	Six episodes	
The Small, Intricate Life of Gerald C. Potter	9 November – 26 December 1977	Gerald C. Potter	Seven episodes	
Lord Peter Wimsey: The Five Red Herrings	4 January – 22 February 1978	Lord Peter Wimsey	Eight episodes	
Jack Buchanan – The Complete Entertainer	14 June – 12 July 1978	Presenter	Five programmes	
Lord Peter Wimsey: Murder Must Advertise	1 January – 5 February 1979	Lord Peter Wimsey	Six episodes	
Desert Island Discs	9 June 1979	Interviewee (Note: His selection was Gustav Holst, The Planets; Vienna Philharmonic, with Herbert von Karajan conducting – The theme from Murder on the Orient Express; Orchestra of the Royal Opera House – Frédéric Chopin, "Waltz in C-sharp minor, Op. 64, No. 2"; Arthur Rubinstein, soloist – Aram Khachaturian, "Adagio of Spartacus and Phrygia" from Spartacus; Vienna Philharmonic, with Khachaturian conducting – Jimmy Dorsey and his Orchestra, "On the Alamo" – Neal Hefti, the theme from Boeing Boeing (1965 film) – Count Basie Orchestra, "Doin' Basie's Thing" – Nino Castelnuovo and Ellen Farner, "Duet Of Guy and Madeleine" from The Umbrellas of Cherbourg. His chosen book was War and Peace by Leo Tolstoy; his luxury item was paper and pencils.)		
The Small, Intricate Life of Gerald C. Potter	24 September – 31 October 1979	Gerald C. Potter	Eight episodes	
Stories by Saki	26 – 28 December 1979	Reader	Three episodes	
Book at Bedtime: Summer Lightning	21 July 1980 – 8 August 1980	Reader	Fifteen episodes	
Lord Peter Wimsey: The Nine Tailors	20 October – 8 December 1980	Lord Peter Wimsey	Eight episodes	
The Small, Intricate Life of Gerald C. Potter	27 April – 1 June 1981	Gerald C. Potter	Six episodes	
Lord Peter Wimsey: Have His Carcase	21 October – 24 November 1981	Lord Peter Wimsey	Six episodes	
Lord Peter Wimsey: Busman's Honeymoon	3 January – 7 February 1983	Lord Peter Wimsey	Six episodes	
Merely Melville	19 – 21 April 1984	Presenter		
Tales from a Palm Court	9 – 16 August 1984	Reader		
Tales from a Palm Court	3 – 10 January 1985	Reader		
With Great Pleasure	26 July 1985	Interviewee		
Banes' People III	20 August 1986	–		
Tales from a Palm Court	19 April – 3 May 1988	Reader		
Pigs Have Wings	22 August – 12 September 1989	Galahad Threepwood	Four episodes	
Strictly T-T	21 February 1990	Presenter	Also writer; the programme was an appreciation of Terry-Thomas	
Galahad at Blandings	23 January 1992 – 13 February 1992	Galahad Threepwood	Four episodes	
The Monday Play: "Fighting Over Beverley"	29 December 1997	Archie		
Cads and Silly Asses	10 February 2004	Presenter		
The Scoundrels' Return: a History of Lifemanship	10 December 2007	Presenter		

== Television ==
Television appearances of Ian Carmichael
Programme	Date	Channel	Role	Notes	Refs.
New Faces	16 August 1947	BBC Television	–		
New Faces	20 September 1947	BBC Television	–		
Cliff Gordon in: Twice Upon a Time	16 & 24 January 1948	BBC Television	–	Revue	
Tricks of the Trade	7 April 1948	BBC Television	–		
Tell Her the Truth	12 June 1948	BBC Television	Dick Dennison		
Old Songs for New	2 August 1948	BBC Television	Singer		
Give My Regards to Leicester Square	21 December 1948	BBC Television	Player		
Jill Darling	12 February 1949	BBC Television	Bobby Jones		
Don't Look Now	12 July 1950	BBC Television	Performer		
Floor Show at the "Regency Room"	5 August 1950	BBC Television	–		
Here's Television	6 January 1951	BBC Television	Performer		
Starlight	9 February 1953	BBC Television	–		
Panorama	12 December 1953	BBC Television	–	Theatrical performer in "A New Suit"; uncredited	
Something to Shout About!	28 June 1955	BBC Television	–		
Here and Now	16 December 1955 – 17 February 1956	ITV	–	Sketch show	
Off the Record	2 January 1956	BBC Television	–		
Alan Melville takes you from A-Z	9 November 1956	BBC Television	–		
Picture Parade	26 February 1957	BBC Television	–		
Carmichael's Night Out	14 March 1957	BBC Television	–		
Rich and Rich	10 August 1957	BBC Television	Guest		
The Girl at the Next Table	18 August 1957	BBC Television	Tom		
The World Our Stage	8 March 1958	BBC Television	–	Recorded excerpt from The Tunnel of Love at Her Majesty's Theatre	
What's My Line?	28 December 1958	BBC Television	Panellist		
Juke Box Jury	22 April 1961	BBC Television	Panellist		
Gilt and Gingerbread	5 September 1961	BBC Television	Charles Yeyder		
Juke Box Jury	22 September 1962	BBC Television	Panellist		
Juke Box Jury	6 July 1963	BBC Television	Panellist		
Compact	2 January 1964	ITV	–	First episode only	
Armchair Theatre: "The Importance of Being Earnest"	15 November 1964	ITV	John Worthing J.P.		
P.G. Wodehouse's The World of Wooster: "Jeeves and the Dog McIntosh"	30 May 1965	BBC Television	Bertie Wooster	Series 1	
P.G. Wodehouse's The World of Wooster: "Jeeves, the Aunt, and the Sluggard"	6 June 1965	BBC Television	Bertie Wooster	Series 1	
P.G. Wodehouse's The World of Wooster: "Jeeves and the Great Sermon Handicap"	13 June 1965	BBC Television	Bertie Wooster	Series 1	
P.G. Wodehouse's The World of Wooster: "Jeeves and the Song of Songs"	20 June 1965	BBC Television	Bertie Wooster	Series 1	
P.G. Wodehouse's The World of Wooster: "Jeeves and the Hero's Reward"	27 June 1965	BBC Television	Bertie Wooster	Series 1	
P.G. Wodehouse's The World of Wooster: "Jeeves and the Inferiority Complex of Old Sippy"	4 July 1965	BBC Television	Bertie Wooster	Series 1	
P.G. Wodehouse's The World of Wooster: "Jeeves and the Delayed Exit of Claude and Eustace"	4 January 1966	BBC Television	Bertie Wooster	Series 2	
P.G. Wodehouse's The World of Wooster: "Jeeves and a Change of Mind"	11 January 1966	BBC Television	Bertie Wooster	Series 2	
P.G. Wodehouse's The World of Wooster: "Jeeves and the Spot of Art"	18 January 1966	BBC Television	Bertie Wooster	Series 2	
P.G. Wodehouse's The World of Wooster: "Jeeves Exerts the Old Cerebellum"	25 January 1966	BBC Television	Bertie Wooster	Series 2	
P.G. Wodehouse's The World of Wooster: "Jeeves and the Purity of the Turf"	1 February 1966	BBC Television	Bertie Wooster	Series 2	
P.G. Wodehouse's The World of Wooster: "Jeeves and the Clustering Round Young Bingo"	8 February 1966	BBC Television	Bertie Wooster	Series 2	
P.G. Wodehouse's The World of Wooster: "Jeeves and the Indian Summer of an Uncle"	15 February 1966	BBC Television	Bertie Wooster	Series 2	
P.G. Wodehouse's The World of Wooster: "Jeeves and the Greasy Bird"	6 October 1967	BBC Television	Bertie Wooster	Series 3	
P.G. Wodehouse's The World of Wooster: "Jeeves and the Stand-in for Sippy"	13 October 1967	BBC Television	Bertie Wooster	Series 3	
P.G. Wodehouse's The World of Wooster: "Jeeves and the Old School Chum"	20 October 1967	BBC Television	Bertie Wooster	Series 3	
P.G. Wodehouse's The World of Wooster: "Jeeves and the Impending Doom"	27 October 1967	BBC Television	Bertie Wooster	Series 3	
P.G. Wodehouse's The World of Wooster: "Jeeves and the Hard-Boiled Egg"	3 November 1967	BBC Television	Bertie Wooster	Series 3	
P.G. Wodehouse's The World of Wooster: "Jeeves and the Love that Purifies"	10 November 1967	BBC Television	Bertie Wooster	Series 3	
P.G. Wodehouse's The World of Wooster: "Jeeves and the Fixing of Freddie"	17 November 1967	BBC Television	Bertie Wooster	Series 3	
I Do! I Do!	16 August 1968	BBC Television	Michael Snow	Scenes from Act 1 of the musical; broadcast from the Lyric Theatre, Hammersmith	
The Last of the Big Spenders	22 October 1968	ITV	Henry Priddis		
Cilla	5 February 1969	BBC Television	Guest		
Call My Bluff	9 October 1969	BBC Television	Panellist		
Call My Bluff	16 October 1969	BBC Television	Panellist		
Brian Rix Presents: "Odd Man In"	29 December 1969	BBC Television	Mervyn Browne		
Play for Today: "Alma Mater"	7 January 1970	BBC Television	Jimmy Nicholson		
The Morecambe & Wise Show	28 January 1970	BBC Television	Guest		
Frost on Sunday	1 February 1970	ITV	Guest		
The Laugh Parade: "The Big Money"	10 February 1970	BBC Television	Willie Frith		
Call My Bluff	2 April 1970	BBC Television	Panellist		
Bachelor Father	17 September – 10 December 1970	BBC Television	Peter Lamb	Series 1	
Father, Dear Father: "An Affair To Forget"	22 June 1971	ITV	Leo		
Bachelor Father	16 September – 11 November 1971	BBC Television	Peter Lamb	Series 2	
The Morecambe & Wise Show	5 December 1971	BBC Television	Guest		
Lord Peter Wimsey: "Clouds of Witness"	5 April – 3 May 1972	BBC Television	Lord Peter Wimsey	Adapted into five parts	
Morecambe and Wise Christmas Show	25 December 1972	BBC Television	Guest		
Lord Peter Wimsey: "The Unpleasantness at the Bellona Club"	1 – 22 February 1973	BBC Television	Lord Peter Wimsey	Adapted into four parts	
Lord Peter Wimsey: "Murder Must Advertise"	30 November – 21 December 1973	BBC Television	Lord Peter Wimsey	Adapted into four parts	
Lord Peter Wimsey: "The Nine Tailors"	22 April – 13 May 1974	BBC Television	Lord Peter Wimsey	Adapted into four parts	
Lord Peter Wimsey: "The Five Red Herrings"	23 July – August 1975	BBC Television	Lord Peter Wimsey	Adapted into four parts	
It's a Celebrity Knockout	9 July 1976	BBC Television	Participant		
Three More Men in a Boat	1 April 1983	BBC Television	Voice of Jerome		
All for Love: "Down at the Hydro"	4 September 1983	ITV	Colonel Hunt		
The Wind in the Willows	27 December 1983	ITV	Rat	Voice only	
The Wind in the Willows	1 October 1984 – 19 June 1990	ITV	Narrator		
Movie Memories	8 August 1985	ITV	–		
A Day in Summer	1 February 1989	ITV	Bellenger		
A Chance to Meet....	4 July 1989	BBC Television	Presenter		
The Play on One: "Obituaries"	16 August 1990	BBC Television	White		
Strathblair	3 May – 19 July 1992	BBC Television	Sir James Menzies	Series 1	
Strathblair	27 June – 29 August 1993	BBC Television	Sir James Menzies	Series 2	
Wonders in the Deep	8 January 1994	BBC Television	Lord Bertie Wedensbury		
The Great Kandinsky	14 April 1995	BBC Television	Patrick McCormick		
Bramwell	19 June 1995	ITV	Oswald		
Wives and Daughters	28 November – 19 December 1999	BBC Television	Lord Cumnor		
A Foot Again in the Past	21 January 2002	BBC Television	Interviewee		
Reputations: "Frankie Howerd"	15 June 2002	BBC Television	Interviewee		
The Royal	19 January 2003 – 5 June 2011	ITV	T.J. Middleditch		

== Filmography ==
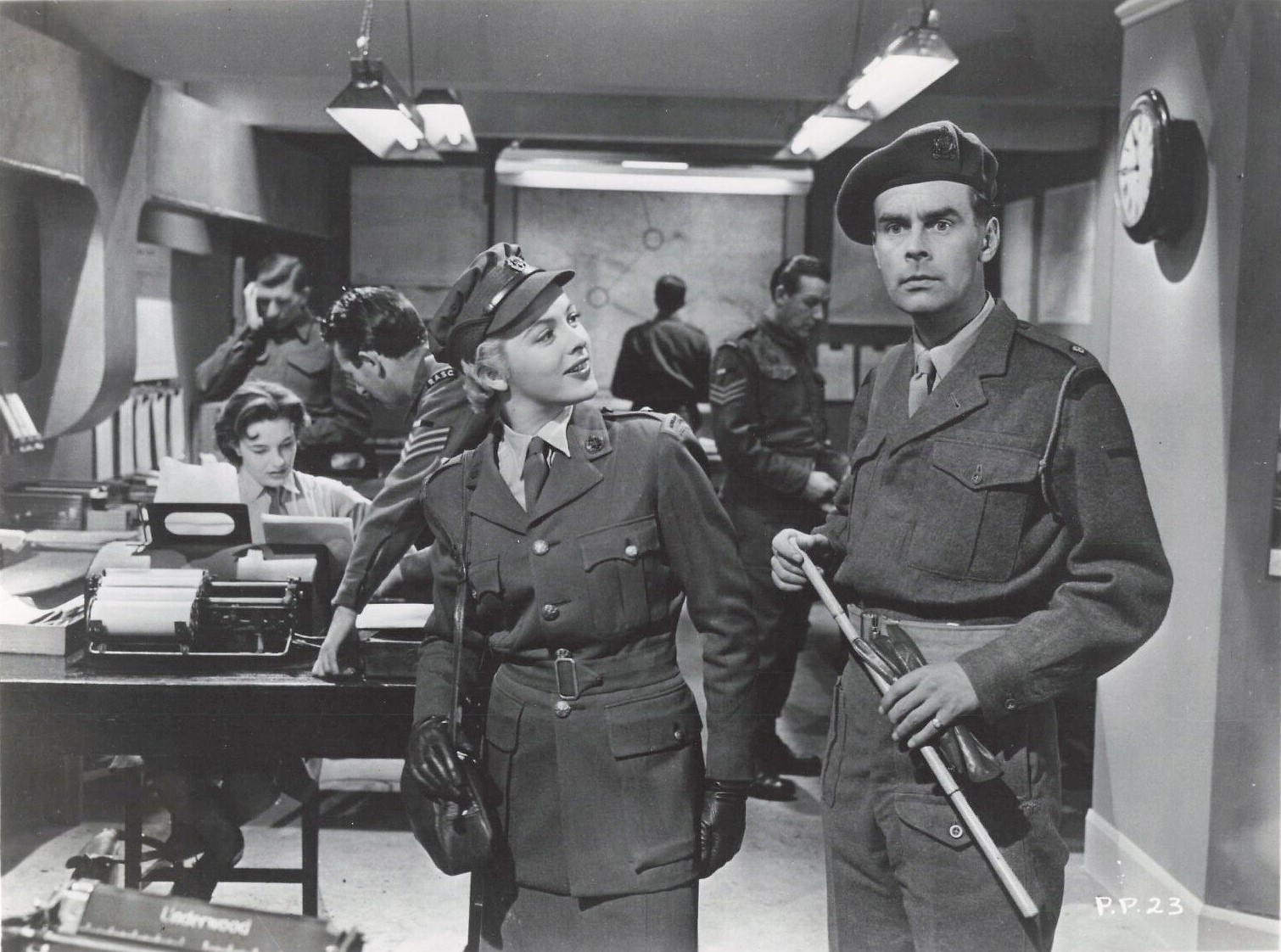
Carmichael and Jill Adams in Private's Progress (1956)

Filmography of Ian Carmichael
Film	Year	Role	Notes
Bond Street	1948	Receptionist at restaurant	Uncredited
Trottie True	1949	Bill the postman	Uncredited
Dear Mr. Prohack	1949	The hatter	
Ghost Ship	1952	Bernard	
Time Gentlemen, Please!	1952	P.R.O.	
Miss Robin Hood	1952	Extra	Uncredited
Meet Mr Lucifer	1953	Man Friday	
Betrayed	1954	Capt. Jackie Lawson	
The Colditz Story	1955	Robin Cartwright	
Storm Over the Nile	1955	Tom Willoughby	
Simon and Laura	1955	David Prentice	
Private's Progress	1956	Stanley Windrush	
Brothers in Law	1957	Roger Thursby	
Lucky Jim	1957	Jim Dixon	
Happy Is the Bride	1958	David Chaytor	
The Big Money	1958	Willie Frith	
Left Right and Centre	1959	Robert Wilcot	
I'm All Right Jack	1959	Stanley Windrush	
School for Scoundrels	1960	Henry Palfrey	
Light Up the Sky!	1960	Lt Ogleby	
Double Bunk	1961	Jack	
The Amorous Prawn	1962	Corporal Sidney Green	
Heavens Above!	1963	The other Smallwood	
Hide and Seek	1964	David Garrett	
Case of the 44s	1965	Jim Pond	
Smashing Time	1967	Bobby Mome-Roth	
The Magnificent Seven Deadly Sins	1971	Mr Ferris	
From Beyond the Grave	1974	Reginald 'Reggie' Warren	
The Lady Vanishes	1979	Caldicott	
Diamond Skulls	1989	Exeter	

== Notes and references ==
=== Sources ===
- Carmichael, Ian (1979). Will the Real Ian Carmichael... London: Macmillan. ISBN 978-0-333-25476-9.
- Fairclough, Robert (2011). This Charming Man: The Life of Ian Carmichael. London: Aurum Press. ISBN 978-1-8451-3664-2.
- Gaye, Freda, ed. (1967). Who's Who in the Theatre (fourteenth ed.). London: Sir Isaac Pitman and Sons. OCLC 5997224.
- Lewisohn, Mark (1998). Radio Times Guide to TV Comedy. London: BBC Books. ISBN 978-0-563-36977-6.
- Pettigrew, Terence (1982). British Film Character Actors: Great Names and Memorable Moments. Newton Abbot, Devon: David & Charles. ISBN 0-7153-8270-5.
- Sheridan, Paul (1952). Late and Early Joys at the Players' Theatre. London: T.V. Boardman. OCLC 504084581.
- Who Was Who (1920–2015). London: A & C Black. 2014. ISBN 978-0-7136-0170-1. (subscription required)
