= A Dorothy L. Sayers Mystery =

1987 BBC TV series

- Titlescreen. The animated title sequence was created by Richard Purdum Productions.
- Genre: Mystery; Period drama
- Starring: Edward Petherbridge; Harriet Walter; Richard Morant
- Composer: Joseph Horovitz
- Country of origin: United Kingdom
- Original language: English
- No. of episodes: 10

Production
- Producer: Michael Chapman
- Running time: 52 minutes

Original release
- Network: BBC2
- Release: 25 March – 27 May 1987

A Dorothy L. Sayers Mystery is a series of television adaptations of three Lord Peter Wimsey novels—Strong Poison, Have His Carcase and Gaudy Night—by Dorothy L. Sayers.

The series follows the aristocratic sleuth Lord Peter's romance with the crime writer Harriet Vane, and stars Edward Petherbridge as Wimsey, Harriet Walter as Vane and Richard Morant as Bunter. The adaptations were first broadcast on BBC2 beginning on 25 March 1987.

== Production ==
According to Harriet Walter in her introduction to a reprint of Gaudy Night, the working title of the series was Harriet Vane, since it encompassed all of the novels to feature the character, except for Busman's Honeymoon, for which the BBC could not obtain the rights.

The series was a co-production with the PBS network station WGBH Boston, which broadcast it under the title Lord Peter Wimsey as part of its Mystery! strand. Walter believed that the change of name perhaps reflected a nervousness about hanging a series on a female character, and on a writer whose name was not well known in the United States compared with Sayers's contemporary, Agatha Christie.

== Episodes ==
All episodes are based on the corresponding novels by Dorothy L. Sayers.

No.	Title	Directed by	Adapted by	Original release date
1	Strong Poison	Christopher Hodson	Philip Broadley	25 March 1987
2	Strong Poison	Christopher Hodson	Philip Broadley	1 April 1987
3	Strong Poison	Christopher Hodson	Philip Broadley	8 April 1987
The crime novelist Harriet Vane is on trial for the murder by poisoning of her former lover Philip Boyes. Lord Peter Wimsey is convinced of her innocence and falls in love with her. After the jury fails to reach a verdict, Lord Peter has 30 days until her retrial to investigate, and proposes marriage to Harriet should he save her. Suspicion soon falls on the solicitor Norman Urquhart, with whom Boyes dined shortly before his demise, with an inconsistent will of a wealthy relative appearing to be the motive.
4	Have His Carcase	Christopher Hodson	Rosemary Anne Sisson	15 April 1987
5	Have His Carcase	Christopher Hodson	Rosemary Anne Sisson	22 April 1987
6	Have His Carcase	Christopher Hodson	Rosemary Anne Sisson	29 April 1987
7	Have His Carcase	Christopher Hodson	Rosemary Anne Sisson	6 May 1987
Having been cleared of murder, Harriet Vane holidays in the West Country, only to find a recently-murdered body on a rock on a deserted beach. Before she can summon help, the corpse is washed away by the tide. Together with Lord Peter Wimsey she investigates and discovers a complex plot involving a wealthy widow and a gigolo who believes he is a member of the Russian aristocracy.
8	Gaudy Night	Michael Simpson	Philip Broadley	13 May 1987
9	Gaudy Night	Michael Simpson	Philip Broadley	20 May 1987
10	Gaudy Night	Michael Simpson	Philip Broadley	27 May 1987
With some trepidation, Harriet Vane attends a reunion "gaudy" dinner at her old Oxford college, where she is welcomed by the dons, but suspects they are mostly interested in her association with Lord Peter Wimsey. A series of poison pen letters, acts of vandalism and other unpleasant events begins to plague the college and threaten the hard-won reputation of women at the university. Harriet is invited back by the Dean and Fellows of the college to investigate discreetly. At the end of the story, Harriet finally accepts Peter's proposal of marriage.

== Reception ==
Compared to what he saw as the more flamboyant interpretation by Ian Carmichael in the 1970s BBC adaptations Lord Peter Wimsey, John J. O'Connor felt that Petherbridge "not only looks the part but also manages to convey the darker tones beneath the surface frivolity of the character as well". Petherbridge noted at the time that he saw Wimsey as "maintaining the impenetrable shell of the silly fool, the complete comedian, to camouflage an underlying extraordinary seriousness."
