= Miss Climpson =

Fictional character created by Dorothy L. Sayers

- Lord Peter Wimsey character
- First appearance: Unnatural Death (1927)
- Created by: Dorothy L. Sayers
- Portrayed by: Ambrosine Phillpotts (1975-76); Shirley Cain (1987); Jennifer Piercey (1999); Celia Imrie (2026)

In-universe information
- Gender: Female
- Nationality: English

Miss Katharine Alexandra Climpson (Alexandra Katharine Climpson in Unnatural Death; also called "Kitty") is a minor character in the Lord Peter Wimsey stories by Dorothy L. Sayers. She appears in two novels: Unnatural Death (1927) and Strong Poison (1930), and is mentioned in Gaudy Night (1935) and Busman's Honeymoon (1937).

== Plot summary ==
Climpson is a spinster who assists Wimsey by doing inquiry and undercover work: Wimsey says she "asks questions which a young man could not put without a blush." In Unnatural Death Climpson is described as "a thin, middle-aged woman, with a sharp, sallow face and very vivacious manner".

In Strong Poison Climpson now runs an employment agency for women, nicknamed "The Cattery." She is a member of a jury in Harriet Vane's trial for murder, and holds out against a guilty verdict, creating a hung jury. She is described as having a "militant High-Church conscience of remarkable staying power." In spite of her conscience, she pretends to be a medium and holds a séance in order to obtain information.

In Unnatural Death, another character describes Miss Climpson's religion in these terms:

You might find her up at the church. She often drops in there to say her prayers like. Not a respectful way to approach a place of worship to my mind...Popping in and out on a week-day, the same as if it was a friend's house. And coming home from Communion as cheerful as anything and ready to laugh and make jokes.

== Reception and analysis ==
According to Catherine Kenney, "Miss Climpson is one of the brighter and more believable examples of the female sleuth." Other scholars have described her as a character whose modern, earnest and public devotion to Anglicanism drives her morality, a characterization unique in Sayers' novels. As a spinster who must seek work, Climpson can also be read as representative of certain socioeconomic challenges of interwar Britain, where women were still expected to marry for economic stability; however, Climpson is not belittled or depicted as pathetic, but instead as a resourceful and perceptive woman who has educated herself to keep up with changing socioeconomic realities, while remaining old-fashioned in some respects.

Miss Climpson appears in print two years before Agatha Christie's famed spinster detective Miss Marple, leading some scholars to see Sayers' character as an inspiration.
