= Gaudy Night =

1935 mystery novel by Dorothy L. Sayers

- First edition
- Author: Dorothy L. Sayers
- Language: English
- Series: Lord Peter Wimsey
- Genre: Mystery novel
- Publisher: Gollancz
- Publication date: 1935
- Publication place: United Kingdom
- Media type: Print
- Pages: 483
- ISBN: 978-0062196538
- Preceded by: The Nine Tailors
- Followed by: Busman's Honeymoon

Gaudy Night (1935) is a mystery novel by Dorothy L. Sayers, the tenth featuring Lord Peter Wimsey, and the third including Harriet Vane.

The dons of Harriet Vane's alma mater, the all-female Shrewsbury College, Oxford (based on Sayers' own Somerville College), have invited her back to attend the annual Gaudy celebrations. However, the mood turns sour when someone begins a series of malicious acts including poison-pen messages, obscene graffiti, and wanton vandalism. Despite the dons' reluctance to share the secret with an outsider, Harriet convinces them to let her bring in Lord Peter Wimsey to assist the investigation – but his involvement is not without complications, both personal and professional. In 1990, Gaudy Night came in at fourth place in The Top 100 Crime Novels of All Time, a ranking by the members (all crime writers) of the Crime Writers' Association in Britain. A similar ranking was made in 1995 by the Mystery Writers of America, putting this novel in eighteenth place.

== Plot ==
Harriet Vane returns with trepidation to her alma mater, Shrewsbury College, Oxford to attend the Gaudy dinner. Expecting hostility because of her notoriety (she had stood trial for murder in an earlier novel, Strong Poison), she is surprised to be welcomed warmly by most of the dons, and rediscovers her old love of academic life. Harriet's short stay is, however, marred by her discovery of a sheet of paper with an offensive drawing, and a poison pen message referring to her as a "dirty murderess".

Some time later the Dean of Shrewsbury writes to ask for her help. There has been an outbreak of vandalism and anonymous letters, and fearing for the college's reputation if this becomes public knowledge, the Dean wants someone to investigate confidentially. Harriet, herself a victim of poison-pen letters since her trial, reluctantly agrees, and returns to spend some months in residence, ostensibly to do research on Sheridan Le Fanu and to assist a don with her book. The timing of the first poison pen message during the gaudy, and the use of a Latin quotation from the Aeneid during one disturbance, focuses suspicion on the Senior Common Room dons, causing escalating tensions.

As Harriet wrestles with the case, trying to narrow down the list of suspects who might be responsible for poison-pen messages, obscene graffiti, wanton vandalism including the destruction of a set of scholarly proofs, and the crafting of vile effigies, she is forced to examine her ambivalent feelings about Wimsey, love and marriage, and her attraction to academia as an intellectual and emotional refuge. Wimsey eventually arrives in Oxford to help, and she gains a new perspective from those who know him, including his nephew, an undergraduate at the university.

The attacks build to a crisis. There is an attempt to drive a vulnerable student to suicide and a physical assault on Harriet that almost kills her. The perpetrator is finally unmasked as Annie Wilson, one of the college scouts, revealed to be the widow of a disgraced University of York academic. Her husband's academic fraud had been exposed by an examiner, destroying his career and driving him to suicide; his suicide note used the Latin quote eventually used by Wilson. The examiner later moved to Shrewsbury College, and the widow's campaign has been her revenge against the examiner in particular and more generally against intellectual women who move outside what she sees as their proper domestic sphere.

At the end of the book, Wimsey admits his own faults in his attempts at courtship, and Harriet comes to terms with her own feelings, finally accepting Wimsey's proposal of marriage.

== Principal characters ==
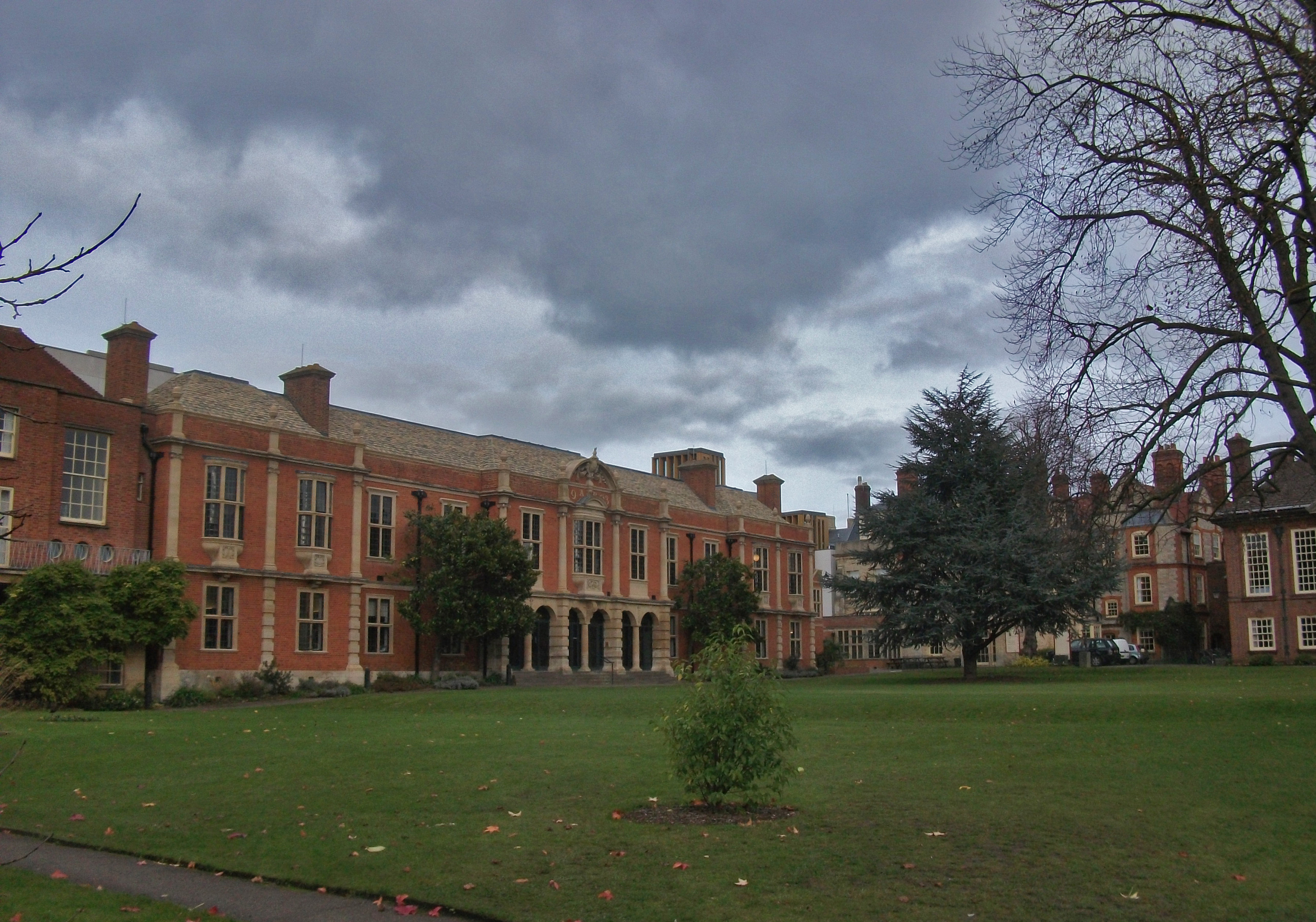
A modern view of Somerville College, Oxford, Sayers' alma mater and the inspiration for her fictional Shrewsbury College

- Harriet Vane – protagonist, a mystery writer
- Lord Peter Wimsey – protagonist, an aristocratic amateur detective
- Letitia Martin – Dean of Shrewsbury College
- Helen de Vine – new Research Fellow at Shrewsbury College
- Miss Lydgate – Harriet's former tutor
- Dr Baring – Warden of Shrewsbury College
- Miss Hillyard – history don at Shrewsbury College
- Phoebe Tucker – Harriet's old college friend
- Viscount Saint-George – Lord Peter's nephew, an undergraduate at Christ Church, Oxford
- Reggie Pomfret – undergraduate at Queen's College
- Miss Burrows – College librarian
- Annie Wilson – scout at Shrewsbury College
- Padgett – Head Porter at Shrewsbury College
- Bunter – Lord Peter's manservant

== Title ==
A "gaudy", at the University of Oxford, is a college feast, typically a reunion for its alumni. The term "gaudy night" appears in Shakespeare's Antony and Cleopatra: "Let's have one other gaudy night: call to me / All my sad captains; fill our bowls once more / Let's mock the midnight bell".

== Reception ==
Writing in 1936, George Orwell disagreed with the opinion of an Observer critic who felt that Gaudy Night had put Miss Sayers "definitely among the great writers". Orwell concluded, to the contrary, that "her slickness in writing has blinded many readers to the fact that her stories, considered as detective stories, are very bad ones. They lack the minimum of probability that even a detective story ought to have, and the crime is always committed in a way that is incredibly tortuous and quite uninteresting".

In a letter to his son Christopher from May 1944, J. R. R. Tolkien wrote: "I could not stand Gaudy Night. I followed P. Wimsey from his attractive beginnings so far, by which time I conceived a loathing for him (and his creatrix) not surpassed by any other character in literature known to me, unless by his Harriet. The honeymoon one (Busman's H[oneymoon].?) was worse. I was sick."

Jacques Barzun stated that "Gaudy Night is a remarkable achievement. Harriet Vane and Saint-George, the undergraduate nephew of Lord Peter, help give variety, and the college setting justifies good intellectual debate. The motive is magnificently orated on by the culprit in a scene that is a striking set-piece. And though the Shrewsbury dons are sometimes hard to distinguish one from another, the College architecture is very good".

== Themes ==
Although no murder occurs in Gaudy Night, it includes a great deal of suspense and psychological thrills. The narrative is interwoven with a love story and an examination of women's struggles to enlarge their roles and achieve some independence within the social climate of 1930s England, and the novel has been described as "the first feminist mystery novel".

The novel deals with a number of philosophical themes, including the right relation between love and independence, and between principles and personal loyalties. Susan Haack has an essay on Gaudy Night as a philosophical novel.

The issue of women's right to academic education is central to the book's plot. Sayers had herself been one of the first women to obtain an Oxford University degree, having been awarded first-class honours in the mediaeval literature examinations of 1915. She attended Somerville College, the basis for the fictional Shrewsbury College of the plot.

== Adaptations ==
The book was adapted as a three-part series for BBC television in 1987, starring Edward Petherbridge as Wimsey and Harriet Walter as Harriet.

In 2005 a dramatisation of the novel was released on CD by the BBC Radio Collection, with Joanna David as Harriet and Ian Carmichael as Wimsey. In 2010 the dramatisation was broadcast on BBC Radio 7.

== See also ==
- University of Oxford § Women's education
