= Lord Peter Wimsey (TV series) =

- Opening titlescreen
- Genre: Mystery; Period drama
- Based on: Stories by Dorothy L. Sayers
- Written by: Anthony Steven; John Bowen; Bill Craig
- Starring: Ian Carmichael; Glyn Houston; Mark Eden
- Composer: Herbert Chappell
- Country of origin: United Kingdom
- Original language: English
- No. of episodes: 21

Production
- Producers: Richard Beynon; Bill Sellars
- Camera setup: Multi-camera
- Running time: 44-60 minutes

Original release
- Network: BBC1
- Release: 5 April 1972 – 13 August 1975

Related
- Lord Peter Wimsey (radio series); A Dorothy L. Sayers Mystery

Lord Peter Wimsey is a series of television serial adaptations of five Lord Peter Wimsey novels by Dorothy L. Sayers, starring Ian Carmichael as Wimsey. They were broadcast on BBC1 between 1972 and 1975, beginning with Clouds of Witness in April 1972 and ending with Five Red Herrings in August 1975.

== Cast ==
- Ian Carmichael as Lord Peter Wimsey
- Glyn Houston as Mervyn Bunter (Clouds of Witness, The Nine Tailors, Five Red Herrings)
- Derek Newark as Mervyn Bunter (The Unpleasantness at the Bellona Club)
- Mark Eden as Inspector Charles Parker (Clouds of Witness, The Unpleasantness at the Bellona Club, Murder Must Advertise, The Nine Tailors)
- Rachel Herbert as Lady Mary Wimsey (Clouds of Witness, Murder Must Advertise)

== Episodes ==
All episodes are based on the corresponding novels written by Dorothy L. Sayers.

No.	Title	Directed by	Adapted by	Original release date
1	Clouds of Witness	Hugh David	Anthony Steven	5 April 1972
2	Clouds of Witness	Hugh David	Anthony Steven	12 April 1972
3	Clouds of Witness	Hugh David	Anthony Steven	19 April 1972
4	Clouds of Witness	Hugh David	Anthony Steven	26 April 1972
5	Clouds of Witness	Hugh David	Anthony Steven	3 May 1972
Lord Peter's amateur sleuthing hobby ends up closer to home, as he finds himself with only weeks to save his own brother, the Duke of Denver, who is due to be tried by his peers of a murder in Yorkshire.
6	The Unpleasantness at the Bellona Club	Ronald Wilson	John Bowen and Anthony Steven	1 February 1973
7	The Unpleasantness at the Bellona Club	Ronald Wilson	John Bowen and Anthony Steven	8 February 1973
8	The Unpleasantness at the Bellona Club	Ronald Wilson	John Bowen and Anthony Steven	15 February 1973
9	The Unpleasantness at the Bellona Club	Ronald Wilson	John Bowen and Anthony Steven	22 February 1973
On Armistice Day, a retired general is found dead at the Bellona Club, a London club for war veterans. A complicated will means any number of people may have a motive for murder.
10	Murder Must Advertise	Rodney Bennett	Bill Craig	30 November 1973
11	Murder Must Advertise	Rodney Bennett	Bill Craig	7 December 1973
12	Murder Must Advertise	Rodney Bennett	Bill Craig	14 December 1973
13	Murder Must Advertise	Rodney Bennett	Bill Craig	21 December 1973
An unpopular copywriter is found dead at Pym's Publicity under suspicious circumstances. Lord Peter goes undercover as "Death Bredon" and uncovers a tangled web linked to the London drug-smuggling underworld.
14	The Nine Tailors	Raymond Menmuir	Anthony Steven	22 April 1974
15	The Nine Tailors	Raymond Menmuir	Anthony Steven	29 April 1974
16	The Nine Tailors	Raymond Menmuir	Anthony Steven	6 May 1974
17	The Nine Tailors	Raymond Menmuir	Anthony Steven	13 May 1974
Stranded in the Fenland village of Fenchurch St Paul on a snowy New Year's Eve, Lord Peter finds himself drawn into the lore of bell-ringing. But the discovery of a body in a freshly-dug grave finds him uncovering a conspiracy involving a stolen set of emeralds, swapped identities and a First World War deserter.
18	Five Red Herrings	Robert Tronson	Anthony Steven	23 July 1975
19	Five Red Herrings	Robert Tronson	Anthony Steven	30 July 1975
20	Five Red Herrings	Robert Tronson	Anthony Steven	6 August 1975
21	Five Red Herrings	Robert Tronson	Anthony Steven	13 August 1975
Lord Peter's fishing holiday in Galloway is disrupted when a talented but quarrelsome painter is found dead. Any one of six fellow artists may have committed the crime.

== Production ==
The adaptations star Ian Carmichael as aristocratic sleuth Lord Peter Wimsey, the second son of the Duke of Denver. Not wanting for money, charm or intelligence, Wimsey takes up detective work as an amateur pursuit, using his connections and social status to assist the police in their investigations.

Carmichael played the role concurrently in a series of BBC Radio 4 adaptations from 1973, which eventually completed the whole sequence of Sayers's novels. In The Radio Detectives (1999), Carmichael recalled that he had hoped to continue with further television adaptations, but acknowledged that by 1975 he was too old to play the part onscreen for the sequence of more romantic novels featuring crime writer Harriet Vane. He felt that as a result of a technician strike, production of the fifth adaptation under a new producer, Bill Sellars, was not as successful, after which the series was not renewed. Three later television adaptations of the Harriet Vane stories were produced as A Dorothy L. Sayers Mystery with Edward Petherbridge as Wimsey in 1987.

Glyn Houston played Wimsey's loyal valet and assistant Mervyn Bunter in three adaptations and Derek Newark in The Unpleasantness at the Bellona Club (the character does not appear in Murder Must Advertise). Mark Eden played Inspector Charles Parker, Lord Peter's friend and contact at Scotland Yard in four adaptations.

The series was recorded in the then-standard format of videotape for studio sequences (recorded at Television Centre, London and Pebble Mill Birmingham from the second serial) and 16mm film for exterior location scenes.

=== Locations ===
Locations included St Peter's Church, Walpole St Peter and Terrington St John, Norfolk for The Nine Tailors and Kirkcudbright, Galloway in Scotland for Five Red Herrings, the latter almost entirely shot on film due to a technician strike, with only a few studio sequences taped in studios in Glasgow.

=== Music ===
The 1930s-style theme tune was written by Herbert Chappell. The BBC record of Herbert Chappell's theme tune featured a second track, "Size Ten Shuffle", which in rearranged form was used as the theme for FilmFair's Paddington (1976–1980).

== Reception ==
The New York Times's John J. O'Connor reviewed the serial Murder Must Advertise, which aired on PBS from 6 to 27 October 1974. O'Connor believed that, despite being an interesting novel, the serial did not transfer itself to television successfully, and was critical of the double role that Carmichael was required to play, believing that "that is where suspension of disbelief, however willing, collapses". However, O'Connor believed that the serial had "more than enough shrewd mischievousness to satisfy the devoted" and felt that it had an "ample quota of delightful moments".
