= Mark Eden =

English actor (1928–2021)

- Eden as Alan Bradley in Coronation Street 1989
- Born: Douglas John Malin; 14 February 1928; London, England
- Died: 1 January 2021 (aged 92); London, England
- Occupation: Actor
- Years active: 1958–2013
- Known for: Coronation Street
- Spouses: Joan Long (m. 1953; div. 1959); Diana W. Smith (m. 1973, c.1984 div); Sue Nicholls (m. 1993)
- Children: 3
- Relatives: Emma Griffiths Malin (granddaughter)

Douglas John Malin (14 February 1928 – 1 January 2021), known professionally as Mark Eden, was an English actor. He was best known for his portrayal of the villainous Alan Bradley in Coronation Street from 1986 to 1989.

== Early life ==
Mark Eden was born Douglas John Malin in St Pancras, London, England on 14 February 1928. He spent two years in hospital after contracting tuberculosis and then spent his earlier working life employed on the fairgrounds.

== Career ==
He did not start acting until he was nearly 30 years old when he joined repertory theatre at Margate. As Mark Eden, he appeared at the Royal Court Theatre and in repertory theatre in England and Wales. His television and film roles include the Doctor Who serial Marco Polo (1964) in which he played Marco Polo, a reporter in Quatermass and the Pit in 1958, Number 100 in The Prisoner in 1967, and Inspector Parker in the TV adaptations of several Lord Peter Wimsey stories in the 1970s. Having briefly played a short lived character named Wally Randle in 1981, he returned for a long-running role in Coronation Street, in which he played Alan Bradley.

Eden's time in Coronation Street came to an end in December 1989 after Bradley was killed by a Blackpool tram. In 2009, Eden unveiled a plaque at the tram stop where the scene was filmed.

After leaving Coronation Street, Eden said he received many casting offers for "psycho" roles. Before the show, Eden had often been cast in the role of an upper-class gentleman. Eden worked on the stage and in radio plays. He also worked with the Beach Boys and wrote a musical about them. His television appearances included playing Boucher in an episode of Poirot. His autobiography, Who's Going to Look at You?, was published in 2010.

== Personal life ==
Eden was married three times. His first wife was Joan Long, whom he married in 1953. Their son, David (1957–2017), also became an actor; and David's daughter (Eden's granddaughter) Emma Griffiths Malin (born 1980) is also an actress. Eden and Joan divorced in 1959, and Joan later married the actor John Le Mesurier.

In 1971, he married Diana W. Smith, whom he had met that year; she later acted under the name Diana Eden. She was eighteen years his junior. They had a daughter named Polly. In 1993, Eden married Sue Nicholls, his co-star in Coronation Street and the daughter of Lord Harmar-Nicholls. They remained married until Eden's death.

Eden suffered from Alzheimer's disease in later life, and was admitted to hospital with the disease in November 2020. He died on 1 January 2021, aged 92.

== Filmography ==
=== Film ===
Year	Title	Role	Notes
1959	Captured	Unknown	
1961	Out of the Shadow	Police constable	
1962	Operation Snatch	Mosquito pilot	
1962	The L-Shaped Room	Terry	
1962	The Password Is Courage	2nd Prisoner of War	
1963	Heavens Above!	Sir Geoffrey Despard	
1963	Blind Corner	Mr. Clayton	
1963	Edgar Wallace Mysteries: "The Partner"	Richard Webb	Second feature; US TV: The Edgar Wallace Mystery Theatre 5:1
1964	Séance on a Wet Afternoon	Charles Clayton	
1965	Game for Three Losers	Mike Williams	
1965	The Pleasure Girls	Prinny	
1965	Doctor Zhivago	Engineer at dam	
1965	Edgar Wallace Mysteries: "Game for Three Losers"	Oliver Marchant	Second feature; US TV: The Edgar Wallace Mystery Theatre 6:1
1967	I'll Never Forget What's'isname	Kellaway	
1968	Attack on the Iron Coast	Lieutenant Commander Donald Kimberly	
1968	Curse of the Crimson Altar	Robert Manning	
1969	Arthur? Arthur!	Jack Parker	
1972	Nobody Ordered Love	Charles	
1976	Fern, the Red Deer	Mr. Pollard	
1980	Richard's Things	Richard Morris	
1985	Claudia	Larry	

=== Television ===
Year	Title	Role	Notes
1958	Quatermass and the Pit	Second Journalist	Episode 1: "The Halfmen"
1960	ITV Television Playhouse	Jeep driver	Series 5, Episode 22: "The English Captain"
1961	ITV Television Playhouse	Corporal Hull	Series 6, Episode 34: "Marking Time"
1961	ITV Television Playhouse	Giovanni Spada	Series 7, Episode 8: "Children of the Sun
1961	Knight Errant Limited	Lord Cambroke	Season 3, Episode 24: "King Charles' Head"
1961	Alcoa Presents: One Step Beyond	Johnny Watson	Series 3, Episode 26: "Signal Received"
1961	Armchair Theatre	UnknownErskine Craig	Series 4: (2 episodes)
1961	The Avengers	Jacques Beronne	Series 1, Episode 9: "Ashes of Roses"
1962	The Avengers	Nicholson	Series 2, Episode 5: "Mission to Montreal"
1962	Sir Francis Drake	Agila	Series 1, Episode 12: "The Slaves of Spain"
1963	Dimensions of Fear	Dr Leosser	Series 1: (2 episodes)
1963	The Saint	Bertrand Tamblin	Series 2, Episode 22: "The Invisible Millionaire"
1963	The Verdict Is Yours	Unknown	Series 3, Episode 26: "Henley v Bone"
1963	Jezebel ex UK	Mark Rawlinson	Series 1, Episode 2: "Send a Telegram"
1963	24-Hour Call	Eddy	Series 1, Episode 10: "Better Live Than Die"
1963	Love Story	Carl Wilson	Series 1, Episode 6: "Make It a Habit"
1963	BBC Sunday-Night Play	Victor	Series 4, Episode 42: "The Shadow of Mart"
1963	Z-Cars	Tiger Evans	Series 2, Episode 36: "A Try by Weir"
1964	Espionage	Wicket	Series 1, Episode 12: "Never Turn Your Back on a Friend"
1964	Doctor Who	Marco Polo	Season 1: “Marco Polo” (7 episodes)
1964	Detective	Bombardier Peter Bradfield	Series 1, Episode 10: "Subject: Murder"
1964	Catch Hand	Johnny Rich	Series 1: (6 episodes)
1965	Armchair Mystery Theatre	Tom Braddock	Series 3, Episode 6: "The Welcome"
1966	Emergency-Ward 10	Tim Courtney	Series 1: (3 episodes)
1966	Thirty-Minute Theatre	Ted Winters	Series 2, Episode 6: "Play to Win"
1966	Out of the Unknown	Stephen Kershaw	Series 2, Episode 6: "The World in Silence"
1967	Till Death Us Do Part	Surgeon	Series 2, Episode 8: "In Sickness and in Health"
1967	St Ives	Alain	Series 1: (3 episodes)
1967	Trapped	Dr Frazer	Series 1, Episode 1: "Journey into Nowhere"
1967	Man in a Suitcase	Jackson	Series 1, Episode 2: "The Sitting Pigeon"
1967	The Prisoner	Number One Hundred	Series 1, Episode 10: "It's Your Funeral"
1968	ITV Playhouse	David Hope	Series 1, Episode 30: "Murder: A Professional Job"
1968	Crime Buster	Ray Saxon	Series 1: (13 episodes)
1969	Z-Cars	Bill Mercer	Series 6: (2 episodes)
1970	Beyond Belief	Unknown	Unknown
1970	The Troubleshooters	Tommy Eastwind	Series 6, Episode 4: "Who Did You Say Inherits the Earth?"
1970	ITV Sunday Night Theatre	Lewis	Series 2, Episode 42: "Hands with the Magic Touch"
1970	If It Moves, File It	Trubshawe	Series 1, Episode 3: "Man Eating Plant"
1971	Suspicion	Detective Sergeant Barron	Series 1, Episode 7: "Plain Jane"
1972	Spyder's Web	Dr Dolek	Series 1, Episode 8: "Lies and Dolls"
1972	Clouds of Witness	Detective Inspector Parker	Series 1: (5 episodes), Lord Peter Wimsey (TV series)
1972	Crown Court	Lawrence Webb	
1973	Crown Court	Douglas Blandford	Series 2, Episode 117: "A Stab in the Front: Part 3"
1973	The Pathfinders	Wing Commander Purvis	Series 1, Episode 11: "Operation Pickpocket"
1973	Arthur of the Britons	Morcant	Series 1, Episode 9: "Enemies and Lovers"
1973	The Unpleasantness at the Bellona Club	Detective Inspector Parker	Series 1: (3 episodes), Lord Peter Wimsey (TV series)
1973	The Adventures of Black Beauty	Major Watkins	Series 1, Episode 22: "Foul Play"
1973	The Rivals of Sherlock Holmes	Roderick Varley	Series 2, Episode 7: "The Superfluous Finger"
1973	Special Branch	Journalist	Series 3, Episode 12: "Hostage"
1973	New Scotland Yard	Peter Royal	Series 3, Episode 7: "Exchange Is No Robbery"
1973	Murder Must Advertise	Chief Inspector Parker	Series 1: (4 episodes), Lord Peter Wimsey (TV series)
1974	The Nine Tailors	Chief Inspector Parker	Series 1, Episode 4, Lord Peter Wimsey (TV series)
1974	A Little Bit of Wisdom	Doctor	Series 1, Episode 6: "And I Mean That Most Sincerely"
1974	The Top Secret Life of Edgar Briggs	Spencer	Series 1: (7 episodes)
1975	General Hospital	Dick Butler	Unknown
1975	Sam	Tony Parker	Series 3: (3 episodes)
1976	Warship	Wing Commander Blazey	Series 3, Episode 11: "Divert with Despatch"
1976	Murder	Detective Inspector John Wrath	Series 1, Episode 2: "Nobody's Conscience"
1977	Jesus of Nazareth	Quartus	TV Mini-series
1977	London Belongs to Me	Jack Rufus	Season 1: (6 episodes)
1977	Poldark	St John Peter	Series 2, Episode 11
1978	Wilde Alliance	Mike Stewart	Series 1, Episode 13: "Some Trust in Chariots"
1978	The Law Centre	Bradley	Series 1, Episode 1: "The Galahad Bit"
1978	ITV Sunday Night Drama	Ken	Series 3, Episode 7: "End of Season"
1980	Cribb	Edmund Vibart	Series 1, Episode 4: "The Detective Wore Silk Drawers"
1980	The Sandbaggers	Bernard Tindale	TV Mini-series
1980	The Square Leopard	John Purvis	Series 1, Episode 5
1980	The Professionals	Ross	Series 4, Episode 11: "Hijack"
1981	Coronation Street	Wally Randle	(10 episodes)
1983	Crown Court	Andrew Corry	Series 12, Episode 28: "Mother's Boy: Part 1"
1983	Gun Fight at the Joe Kaye Corral	Joe Kaye	TV movie
1984	Sorrel and Son	Oscar Wilde	Series 1, Episode 5
1985	The Practice	Keith Goddard	Series 1: (4 episodes)
1985	The Detective	Wilf Penfield	Series 1: (5 episodes)
1986	The Collectors	George Haycock	Series 1, Episode 7: "The Dog It Was..."
1986–1989	Coronation Street	Alan Bradley	(221 episodes)
1991	Cluedo	George Biddle	Series 2, Episode 2: "The Best Insurance"
1993	Agatha Christie: Poirot	Boucher	Series 5, Episode 6: "The Chocolate Box"
2002	Doctors	Arthur Lisser (2002)	Series 4, Episode 33: "The Trouble with Arthur"
2006	Doctors	Glen Hodgkins (2006)	Series 7, Episode 131: "Loyalty"
2008	Casualty	Bill	Series 23, Episode 13: "A Slip in Time"
2013	An Adventure in Space and Time	Donald Baverstock	TV movie
