= Gaudy =

Jargon term in UK student life

Gaudy or gaudie (from the Latin, "gaudium", meaning "enjoyment" or "merry-making") is a term used to reflect student life in a number of the ancient universities in the United Kingdom as well as other institutions such as Durham University and Reading University. It is generally believed to relate to the traditional student song, "De Brevitate Vitae" (On the Shortness of Life), which is commonly known as the Gaudeamus (Let's make merry) by its first word.

== Universities in England ==
=== Durham University ===
At St Chad's College the College feast day begins with a proclamation of the feast and includes an early rise, college invasions, green breakfast, as well as a host of competitions that see students spread out into the City vying to win various awards. More serious highlights include a service in the Cathedral and musical performances in the Quad. Alumni have a parallel set of events on or around the same day in Durham and (usually) in London. Previous events that were termed 'gaudies' are now more often called 'feasts' (by the college) or 'mega-formals' (by the JCR): these are all black-tie and gowned affairs that occur several times a term to mark major feasts and special events.

=== University of Oxford ===
At the University of Oxford a gaudy ('gaude' at New College, Oxford, pronounced the same) is a college feast. It is often a reunion for its alumni. The origin of the term may be connected to the traditional student anthem, Gaudeamus.

Gaudies generally involve a celebratory formal dinner, generally in black tie and academic gowns (scarlet festal robes for doctors), and may include events such as chapel services, lectures, or concerts beforehand. For reunions, the invitees are generally graduate alumni from a number of (usually two or three) consecutive matriculation years, e.g. 1999–2001. Typically, gaudies are held for each year-group on around a ten-year cycle.

=== University of Reading ===
Wantage Hall, one of the university's halls of residence, holds an annual Freshers Gaudie, which is a legacy from when the University of Reading was an extension college of Christ Church, Oxford University.

== Universities in Scotland ==
=== University of Aberdeen ===
At the University of Aberdeen, The Gaudie is the name of the student newspaper produced under the auspices of the Aberdeen University Students' Association. It is recognised as the oldest student newspaper in Scotland.

=== Universities of Dundee and St Andrews ===
At the University of Dundee, gaudie nights are traditional student celebrations involving the issue of junior students (male "bejants" and female "bejantines") with senior 'academic parents' (typically one male, one female – a "senior man" and a "senior woman") in order to introduce them to higher education and to provide socialisation. These events are usually held a short time after the institution's Freshers' Week. The Night itself involves the academic parents taking their younger charges out for an evening's entertainment at the parent's expense.

These evenings are followed by Raisin Monday which is used by the junior students to thank the academic parents (usually in a ritualised fashion) for gaudie night. The junior student provides a gift for the senior student, and in turn receives a "receipt" from the senior – this receipt can be an item of clothing such as a hat or costume, or something challenging to carry, such as a car tyre or a lavatory seat, and the receipt is worn or carried by the bejant or bejantine until midday. Raisin Monday typically happens at some point in the early winter of the first semester.

Similar traditions remain at Dundee University's erstwhile parent institution, the University of St Andrews, but are however incorporated into a Raisin Weekend and the term gaudie night is not used for the first night. Many traditions surround this event including Raisin receipts in Latin, a foam fight, and Raisin strings given by the academic mother to be hung on the Bejant/Bejantine's academic gown.

St Andrews has a separate ceremony known as the gaudie which involves a gowned torchlight procession and singing of the Gaudeamus in memory of a student, John Honey who risked his life in 1800 to save survivors of a shipping accident offshore.

== Schools ==
- At St Edward's School, Oxford, and Radley College in Oxfordshire, gaudy is the name given to the end-of-year celebrations; occasionally taking the form of an evening event.

== Cultural references ==
The Lord Peter Wimsey mystery Gaudy Night, by Dorothy Sayers, is partly set at such a reunion at a fictional women's college at Oxford. Sayers also uses "Gaudy" as the name of one of the bells in The Nine Tailors.

The Gaudy (1974), set in an unnamed Oxford college, is the first novel in the A Staircase in Surrey quintet by J. I. M. Stewart.
