= Unnatural Death (novel) =

1927 mystery novel by Dorothy L. Sayers

- First edition
- Author: Dorothy L. Sayers
- Language: English
- Series: Lord Peter Wimsey
- Genre: Mystery novel
- Publisher: Ernest Benn
- Publication date: 1927
- Publication place: United Kingdom
- Media type: Print
- Pages: 285
- Preceded by: Clouds of Witness
- Followed by: The Unpleasantness at the Bellona Club

Unnatural Death is a 1927 mystery novel by Dorothy L. Sayers, her third featuring Lord Peter Wimsey. It was published under the title The Dawson Pedigree in the United States in 1928.

== Plot ==
Lord Peter Wimsey and his friend Chief Inspector Parker hear about the death, in late 1925, of an elderly cancer sufferer named Agatha Dawson who was being cared for by her great-niece Mary Whittaker. Miss Dawson had an aversion to making a will and believed that, if she died without one, Miss Whittaker, her only known relative, would automatically inherit everything.

Wimsey is intrigued despite there being no evidence of any crime. He sends his private investigator, Miss Katharine Climpson, to investigate. She discovers that shortly before Miss Dawson's death her maids, the sisters Bertha and Evelyn Gotobed, had been dismissed. Wimsey asks his solicitor friend John Murbles to place advertisements in the press asking them to get in touch. A few days later, Bertha is found dead in Epping Forest. On the body is a £5 banknote, originally issued to a Mrs Forrest who lives in an elegant flat in London's South Audley Street.

Wimsey and Parker visit her. She claims not to remember the banknote, but thinks she may have used it to bet on a horse. Wimsey tricks her into providing her fingerprints on a wineglass. In a drawer he finds a hypodermic syringe with a doctor's prescription: "to be injected when the pain is very severe".

Evelyn Gotobed tells Wimsey of an episode shortly before the sisters were dismissed in which Miss Whittaker had tried, unsuccessfully, to get them to witness Miss Dawson signing her will.

Wimsey visits a West Indian clergyman named Hallelujah Dawson, now in London. It seems that he may be a cousin of Miss Dawson, and a closer relative than Miss Whittaker. He has a large family and is in need of funds.

Wimsey learns of a motive for Miss Dawson to be killed before the end of 1925: a new 'Property Act', due to come into force on 1 January 1926, that changed the law of intestacy. Until 1925, the estate of a person dying without a will always passed to the closest relative, no matter how remote. From 1926, in the absence of near relatives the estate is forfeit to the Crown; the interpretation of the new law is unsettled, but lawyers consulted by Wimsey suspect that a grand-niece might be considered too distant a relative to inherit. One lawyer tells Wimsey that a woman matching Miss Whittaker's description had asked him the same question.

Wimsey visits Mrs Forrest at her flat, where she unsuccessfully tries to drug him. She makes rather clumsy advances, and Wimsey suspects blackmail. He kisses her, realises that she is physically revolted, and slips away.

Miss Climpson reports that Mary Whittaker "is not of the marrying sort". Whittaker disappears along with her besotted young female admirer, Vera Findlater. Several days later, Miss Findlater's body is found on the downs, brutally disfigured by a blow to the head. There is no sign of Mary Whittaker. A distinctive cap and male footprints nearby suggest a link with Hallelujah Dawson. However, the post mortem finds that Vera Findlater was already dead when she was struck. Close inspection reveals that the footprints were faked, and that the scene has been set up in order to frame the innocent clergyman. Tyre tracks from Mrs Forrest's car cause Wimsey to suspect her and Mary Whittaker of acting in collusion.

Wimsey's manservant, Bunter, realises that fingerprints on Mrs Forrest's wineglass are identical to those on a cheque written by Miss Whittaker. Wimsey at last understands that Muriel Forrest and Mary Whittaker are one and the same person. She carried out the murders by injecting air into her victims' bloodstream with her hypodermic syringe, causing blockage and immediate death through heart failure.

Miss Climpson heads to South Audley Street where she finds Mary Whittaker in her guise as Mrs Forrest. She attacks Miss Climpson, who is saved from becoming another fatality by the timely arrival of Wimsey and Parker.

Whittaker is committed to prison to await trial. There, she commits suicide. Wimsey is sickened by the killer's evil and greed. Coming out of the prison on a sunny day with Parker, he finds a darkened world: they have emerged just at the time of the total solar eclipse.

== Characters ==
- Lord Peter Wimsey – protagonist, aristocratic amateur detective
- Detective-Inspector Charles Parker – Wimsey's friend
- Mervyn Bunter – Wimsey's manservant
- Miss Alexandra Katherine Climpson – enquiry agent employed by Wimsey
- Miss Agatha Dawson (deceased) – wealthy woman who had died suddenly some time before the book opens
- Miss Mary Whittaker – Miss Dawson's great-niece, the granddaughter of her sister
- Dr Edward Carr – Miss Dawson's physician
- Miss Vera Findlater – friend and besotted admirer of Miss Whittaker
- Miss Philliter – former nurse of Miss Dawson, engaged to Dr Carr
- Bertha and Evelyn Gotobed – former servants of Miss Dawson
- Rev Hallelujah Dawson – impoverished West Indian clergyman and cousin of Miss Dawson
- Mr John Murbles – solicitor and friend of Wimsey
- Mrs Forrest – fashionable lady living in London

== Literary significance and criticism ==
According to James Brabazon in his biography of Sayers, she drew her ingenious and medically doubtful murder method from her familiarity with motor engines, gained from her affair with a car mechanic and motor-bike enthusiast.

In their review of crime novels, the US writers Barzun and Taylor stated that "The tale is perhaps a little forced in conception and remote in tone. That is the trouble with all the great masters – they accustom us to such dazzling performances that when they give us what would seem wonderful coming from other hands, we sniff and act choosy. The mode of compassing death has been carped at, but no one could do anything but rejoice at Miss Climpson and her subterfuges."

HRF Keating, writing in 1989, noted that Sayers had "invented a murder method that is appropriately dramatic and cunningly ingenious, the injection of an air-bubble with a hypodermic". However, "not only would it require the use of an instrument so large as to be farcical, but Miss Sayers has her bubble put into an artery not a vein. No wonder afterwards she pledged herself 'strictly in future to seeing I never write a book which I know to be careless'."

== Themes and treatment ==
In Murder in the Closet: Essays on Queer Clues in Crime Fiction before Stonewall (2017), Noah Stewart described Mary Whittaker as being "to my knowledge the most clearly delineated homosexual character in Golden Age detective fiction, despite the word 'lesbian' never being used, and she's depicted as enticing a young girl into a life of homosexuality". The episode in which Mary Whittaker is kissed by Wimsey is "the closest that a writer in 1927 would be able to come to saying that a character was a lesbian and that kissing a man made her want to vomit." Laura Vorachek argued that, in the novel, "Sayers attempts to challenge the prevalent cultural associations of blackness and criminality."

== Legal background ==
On 1 January 1926, the date specified by Sayers, two important property statutes came into force in England: the Law of Property Act 1925 and the Administration of Estates Act 1925. The latter, corresponding most closely with the ‘Property Act’ of the novel, swept away the old rules on intestacy and specified by way of a list in section 46(1)(v) the persons who would inherit if the intestate left no spouse, issue or parents. If the deceased had no surviving relatives of the classes mentioned (which did not include great-nieces, according to the novel), the estate would go to the Crown. However, the correct legal position is that great-nieces were included by virtue of section 47(3).

== Adaptations ==
In May 1975, an adaptation was made for BBC Radio 4, produced by Simon Brett and starring Ian Carmichael as Lord Peter Wimsey.
