= John Cournos =

American writer (1881–1966)

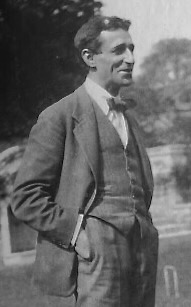
Image of John Cournos

John Cournos, born Ivan Grigorievich Korshun (Иван Григорьевич Коршун; 6 March 1881 – 27 August 1966), was an American writer and translator.

== Biography ==
Cournos was born into a Russian Jewish family in Zhytomyr, Russian Empire (now in Ukraine). His first language was Yiddish; he studied Russian, German, and Hebrew with a tutor at home. When he was 10 years old his family emigrated to Philadelphia, where he learned English.

Later in life he married Helen Kestner Satterthwaite (1893–1960), who was also an author and published under the pseudonyms Sybil Norton and John Hawk. His affair with Dorothy L. Sayers was fictionalised by Sayers in the detective book Strong Poison (1930) and by Cournos himself in The Devil Is an English Gentleman (1932).

=== Literary career ===
In June 1912, Cournos moved to London, where he freelanced as an interviewer and critic for both UK and US publications and began his literary career as a poet and, later, novelist. He later emigrated to the US, where he spent the rest of his life.

He was one of the Imagist poets, but is better known for his novels, short stories, essays, and criticism, as well as for his translations of Russian literature. He used the pseudonym John Courtney. He also wrote for The Philadelphia Record under the pseudonym "Gorky." From 1937 to 1947, his work was published in The Atlantic.

Cournos and Satterthwaite, under her pseudonym Sybil Norton, collaborated on several books, including Famous Modern American Novelists, Famous British Novelists, Best World Short Stories of 1947, and John Adams a biography.

=== Anti-communism ===
In the aftermath of the October Revolution Cournos was involved with a London-based anti-Communist organisation, the Russian Liberation Committee. On its behalf, he wrote in 1919 a propaganda pamphlet, London under the Bolsheviks: A Londoner's Dream on Returning from Petrograd, based largely on what he saw during his 1917–1918 visit to Aleksey Remizov, whose Chasy he was then translating as The Clock. It closely parallels the early events of the Bolshevik seizure of power in Russia, but with a British setting.

=== Death ===
Cournos died in New York City at the age of 85 in the New York Infirmary, survived by two stepchildren via Satterthwaite.

== Bibliography ==
- Gordon Craig and the Theatre of the Future (1914)
- The Mask (1919)
- London Under the Bolsheviks (1919)
- The Wall (1921?)
- Babel (1922)
- The Best British Short Stories of 1922 (as Editor, 1922?)
- In Exile (1923)
- The New Candide (1924)
- Sport of Gods (1925)
- Miranda Masters (1926)
- O'Flaherty the Great (1928)
- A Modern Plutarch (1928)
- Short Stories out of Soviet Russia (1929)
- Grandmother Martin Is Murdered (1930)
- Wandering Women/The Samovar (1930)
- The Devil Is an English Gentleman (1932)
- Autobiography (1935)
- An Epistle to the Hebrews (1938)
- An Open Letter to Jews and Christians (1938)
- Hear, O Israel (1938)
- Book of Prophecy from Egyptians to Hitler (1938)
- A Boy Named John (1941)
- A Treasury of Russian Life and Humor (1943)
- Famous Modern American Novelists (1952)
- Pilgrimage to Freedom (1953; written jointly with Sybil Norton, illustrated by Rus Anderson)
- American Short Stories of the Nineteenth Century (1955: Everyman's Library)
- A Teasury of Classic Russian literature (1961)
- With Hey, Ho... and The Man with the Spats (1963)
- The Created Legend – translation of a book by Fyodor Sologub [pseud.] (unknown date of publication)
