= Harriet Vane =

Fictional character by Dorothy L. Sayers

Harriet Deborah Vane
- Lord Peter Wimsey character
- First appearance: Strong Poison (1930)
- Last appearance: The Late Scholar (2013)
- Created by: Dorothy L. Sayers
- Portrayed by: Constance Cummings (1940); Sarah Badel (1983); Harriet Walter (1987); Emily Richard (1988)
- Voiced by: Anne Bell (1976); Maria Aitken (1981); Joanna David (2005); Clare Corbett (2026)

In-universe information
- Gender: Female
- Occupation: Author of detective stories
- Spouse: Lord Peter Wimsey
- Children: Bredon Wimsey (son); Roger Wimsey (son); Paul Wimsey (son) (possibly two more)
- Nationality: British

Harriet Deborah Vane, later Lady Peter Wimsey, is a fictional character in the works of British writer Dorothy L. Sayers (1893–1957) and the sequels by Jill Paton Walsh.

Vane, a mystery writer, initially meets Lord Peter Wimsey while she is on trial for poisoning her lover (Strong Poison). The detective falls in love with her and proposes marriage, but she refuses to begin a relationship with him, traumatised as she is by her dead lover's treatment of her and her recent ordeal. In Have His Carcase, she collaborates with Wimsey to solve a murder but refuses his repeated offers of marriage. She eventually returns his love (Gaudy Night) and marries him (Busman's Honeymoon).

== Character biography ==
Harriet Vane was born in 1903, the only daughter of a country doctor. She was an undergraduate at Shrewsbury College, Oxford (based on Sayers' own Somerville College, the location of which is given as the Balliol College Sports Grounds, now partly occupied by a residential annexe, on Holywell Street) and took a First in English. Her parents both died while she was quite young and she was left to make her own fortune at the age of 23. She has had some success as a writer of detective stories, living and socialising with other artists in Bloomsbury. She begins a relationship with Philip Boyes, a more literary but far less successful writer who professes not to believe in marriage, and she agrees to live with him without marrying. After a year of this arrangement, Boyes believes that she truly loves him and proposes marriage. Angered by his hypocrisy and aghast at being offered marriage as "a good-conduct prize", Harriet breaks off the relationship.

Boyes dies soon afterwards of arsenic poisoning – the method Harriet had researched for her new book. She is arrested and tried for murdering Boyes. Wimsey comes to her rescue by proving who really poisoned Boyes.

The murder trial and acquittal make Harriet notorious. Sales of her books skyrocket. Wimsey continues to pursue her romantically, but Harriet repeatedly declines marriage on the principle that gratitude is not a good basis for it. To relax, she takes a walking tour, during which she finds a corpse on a beach, adding to her notoriety. The press is naturally interested; Wimsey hastens to the scene, after receiving a tip from a journalist friend, to help shield Harriet from suspicion and negative press coverage. The two investigate the death and unmask the murderer. The novel makes it clear that they are intellectually and socially compatible, but that Harriet is too emotionally scarred to entertain Wimsey's offer of marriage.

A few years later, in 1935, Harriet returns to her old Oxford college for a reunion (or Gaudy) and is later asked to investigate some strange occurrences there. She protests that she is not a sleuth, and recommends that the college hire professional detectives. However, failing to reach either Miss Climpson, at the female detective agency set up by Wimsey, or Wimsey himself, she agrees to assist the college. Her cover is research into Sheridan Le Fanu (in the books spelled Lefanu), an Anglo-Irish writer of Gothic tales and mystery novels of the 19th century. (In Thrones, Dominations, the Authors' Note – plural, since the novel was finished posthumously by another author – states that Vane published a monograph on Le Fanu in 1946.) After months of unpleasant incidents at the college and with no solution in sight, Harriet turns once again to Wimsey for help. By the end of the book the villain has been discovered and Harriet has finally accepted Wimsey's proposal.

The press is delighted to have a woman once accused of murder engaged to a duke's son, and chases them relentlessly about the wedding. To escape the press, Wimsey and Vane have a quiet wedding in Oxford with no notice to the press, and leave for a quite honeymoon at Talboys, a Tudor farmhouse in North Hertfordshire which Harriet had admired as a child and which Peter has given her as a wedding present. The body of the former owner is discovered in the cellar, leading them to have a "Busman's Honeymoon," described by Sayers as a love story with detective interruptions.

Thrones, Dominations, a novel abandoned by Sayers and finished by Jill Paton Walsh, is set in and around London, shortly after Wimsey and Vane return from their honeymoon.

The first of their children is born in the story "The Haunted Policeman".

By the time of the short story "Talboys", they have three sons: Bredon Delagardie Peter Wimsey (born in October 1936), Paul Wimsey (born 1938), and Roger Wimsey (born 1940 or 1941). Chronologically between the two are The Wimsey Papers, a series of epistolary articles Sayers wrote for The Spectator at the beginning of World War II. Jill Paton Walsh referenced The Wimsey Papers in writing A Presumption of Death, set at the beginning of the Second World War, in which Harriet takes a leading role. Sayers told friends orally that Harriet and Peter Wimsey were to have five children in all, though she did not disclose the names and sexes of the two youngest children. However, Paton Walsh did not follow this part of the Sayers heritage, and in her Wimsey books no further children come after the original three.

== Fictional works by Harriet Vane ==
The following is a list of works mentioned by Dorothy Sayers and/or Jill Paton Walsh in their novels. The protagonist in most of the books is private sleuth Robert Templeton.

- Blades of Hatred in Chapter 8 of The Late Scholar.
- Curiosity Killed the Cat in chapter 13 of Busman’s Honeymoon. Possibly as a joke.
- Death ‘Twixt Wind and Water in Chapter 11 of Gaudy Night; Chapter 10 of Thrones, Dominations, and Chapter 10 of The Late Scholar.
- Death in the Pot in Chapter 4 of A Presumption of Death.
- The Fountain Pen Mystery in Chapter 1 of Have His Carcase; Chapter 17 of The Attenbury Emeralds; chapter 4 of A Presumption of Death.
- Murder by Degrees in Chapter 1 of Have His Carcase; Chapter 4 of Presumption of Death; Chapter 9 of The Late Scholar.
- The Sands of Crime in chapter 1 of Gaudy Night.
- Sheridan Le Fanu Monograph in Thrones, Dominations, Author’s Note. In Gaudy Night, its tentative title is given as Study of Le Fanu.
- Three short stories are mentioned in chapter 14 of Busman’s Honeymoon.
- A novel set in Carcassonne and one set in Madrid in the first chapter of Have His Carcase.
- Series of short stories set in Berlin in the first chapter of Have His Carcase.

== Influences ==
Sayers consciously modelled Vane on herself, although perhaps not as closely as her fans (and even friends) sometimes thought. Some view Vane as a stand-in for the author, although Vane has many more faults than most such characters.

Sayers was among the first generation of women to receive an Oxford education, graduating BA with first-class honours in 1915 and as an MA in 1920. She gave Harriet Vane, too, an Oxford education. Vane's relationship with Boyes has many similarities with Sayers' love affair (1921–1922) with the author John Cournos (1881–1966), a Russian-born American Jew.

Biographers note that Sayers' later relationship with Bill White and her marriage to the fellow writer Oswald Atherton "Mac" Fleming provide grist for Vane's struggle to balance love (and perhaps marriage to Wimsey) and her work. After Sayers' affairs with Cournos and White were revealed, the comparisons between Sayers and Vane became more emphatic. (Neither of these affairs was publicly known during Sayers' lifetime.)

McGregor and Lewis suggest that some of Vane's and Wimsey's observations about mystery in story versus real life – though in the context of a mystery story – reflect Sayers' sense of fun and ability to laugh with her characters.

== Bibliography ==
=== Books by Dorothy L. Sayers ===
- Strong Poison (1930)
- Have His Carcase (1932)
- Gaudy Night (1936)
- Busman's Honeymoon (1937) (As Lady Peter Wimsey)
- In the Teeth of the Evidence (1939) (editions published after 1942 usually add Talboys, the last story Sayers wrote to feature Lord and Lady Peter Wimsey)

=== Books by Jill Paton Walsh ===
- Thrones, Dominations (1998) by Dorothy L. Sayers and Jill Paton Walsh (as Lady Peter Wimsey)
- A Presumption of Death (2002) by Jill Paton Walsh (as Lady Peter Wimsey)
- The Attenbury Emeralds (2010) by Jill Paton Walsh (as Lady Peter Wimsey)
- The Late Scholar (2013) by Jill Paton Walsh (as Duchess of Denver)

== Portrayal in film, TV or theatre ==
Harriet Vane was portrayed by Constance Cummings in a 1940 film adaptation of Busman's Honeymoon (US: The Haunted Honeymoon), with Robert Montgomery as Peter Wimsey. However, the film bore little resemblance to Sayers' writing, and she refused to see it. Vane was voiced by Sarah Badel in a BBC Radio 4 serialization of 'Busman's Honeymoon' in 1983 and was played by Harriet Walter in the 1987 BBC television adaptations of Strong Poison, Have his Carcase and Gaudy Night and by Emily Richard in the 1988 stage adaptation of Busman's Honeymoon at The Lyric Theatre, Hammersmith. In a 2005 BBC audio production of Gaudy Night, Harriet Vane was played by Joanna David.
