= John Honey =

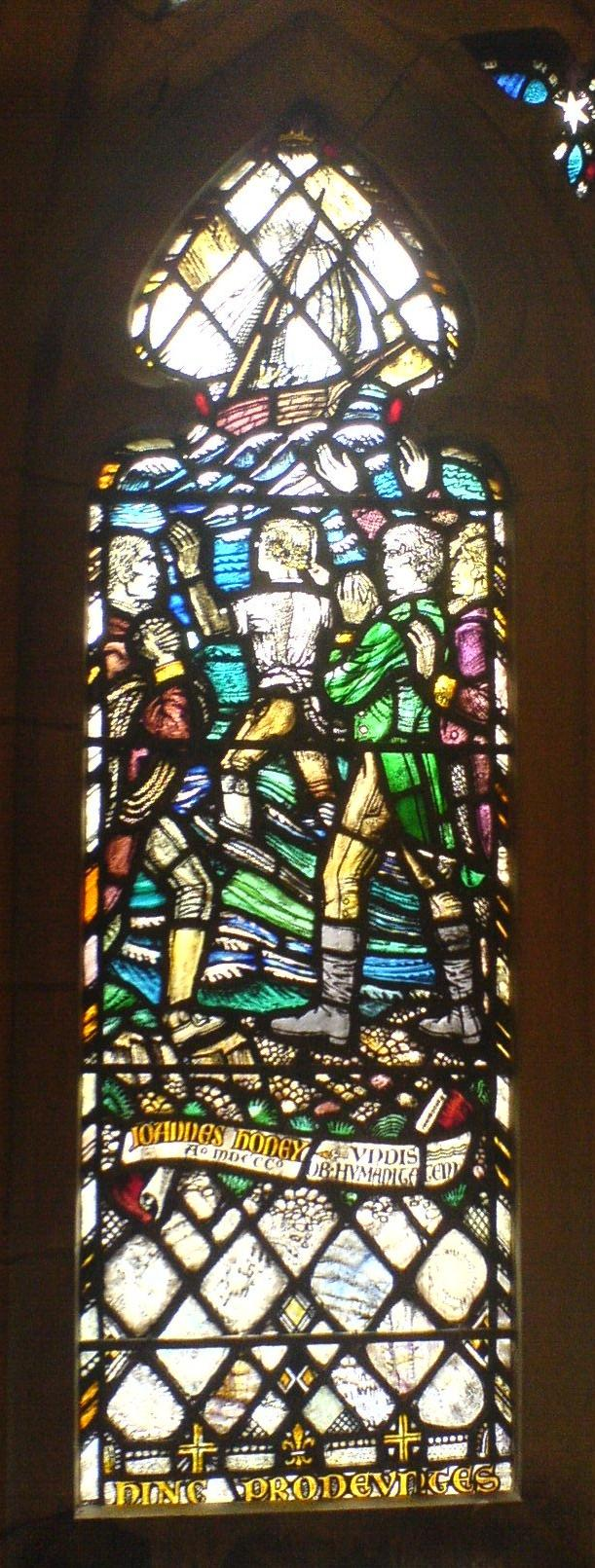
The John Honey window located in St Salvator's Chapel, the University of St Andrews.

John Honey (1781–1813) became famous as a nineteen-year-old student of the University of St Andrews. On 5 January 1800 he was attending a service at St Salvator's Chapel when the congregation received news that a small ship, the Janet of Macduff, had run aground east of the town harbour. Five men were stranded in the sea and, at the time, there was no lifeboat stationed in the town. A crowd had gathered, but the sea was stormy and rescue attempts failed.

However, Honey, apparently determined not to let the men drown without attempting a rescue, stripped off his clothes, had fellow students tie a rope around him, took a knife, and entered the water. After a false start when his friends thought he would be unable to reach the men and pulled him back ashore, Honey struck out once more, reached and boarded the sinking boat and brought from it a rope back to the shore, to serve as a lifeline to allow the men to escape. However, the crew were too weary to make the journey to shore alone, so Honey made five more trips to and from the boat, taking each man to safety in turn, before collapsing of exhaustion on the shore.

Honey is commonly misunderstood to have died during the rescue attempt. In fact he survived to receive the Freedom of the Cities of St Andrews, Perth, Forfar and Auchtermuchty. His commendation from the magistrates of St Andrews reads: "[This] is the only gift that this corporation can bestow upon you, for your wonderful and unexampled exertions in rescuing from the jaws of death the master and four seamen of the sloop the Janet of Macduff, wrecked in these sands of St Andrews, and who, but for your humane and unparalleled exertions, at the imminent hazard of your own life, must have inevitably perished." He went on to become a Perthshire minister, but died at the age of 32 following a prolonged period of ill-health thought to have been linked to injuries he sustained on his final trip, when struck across the chest by a falling mast.

== Legacy ==
Honey is venerated as a hero of St Andrews and specifically the student body, including the following:

- The Pier Walk, a trip traditionally made by students most commonly after Chapel on Sundays down to the end of the pier and back, is commonly said to exist in commemoration of Honey's act of bravery.
- At sundown every 30 April, the evening before the famous "May Morning Dip", there is a candle-lit procession known as "The Gaudie", where students, adorned in their red university gowns, are led by pipers from the university to the East Sands pier where a wreath is cast into the sea to commemorate John Honey.
- A window in St Salvator's Chapel, visible only from the organ loft, depicts Honey's rescue attempt along with two other sets of St Andrews 'martyrs', Patrick Hamilton and the Fallen of World War I.
- The Students' Association maintains an annual John Honey Award, the highest honour that it bestows upon a student, given on grounds of extraordinary service to the student body only in years when such a contribution can be identified.
- The first dedicated computer science building at the University of St Andrews takes his name.
