= Three Birds Alighting on a Field =

1992 play by Timberlake Wertenbaker

Three Birds Alighting on a Field is a 1991 play by Timberlake Wertenbaker. Set in the 1980s, it tells the story of various characters associated with a failing art gallery and an opera house, and their attempts to improve their prestige.
