= Harriet Walter =

English actress (born 1950)

Dame Harriet Walter DBE
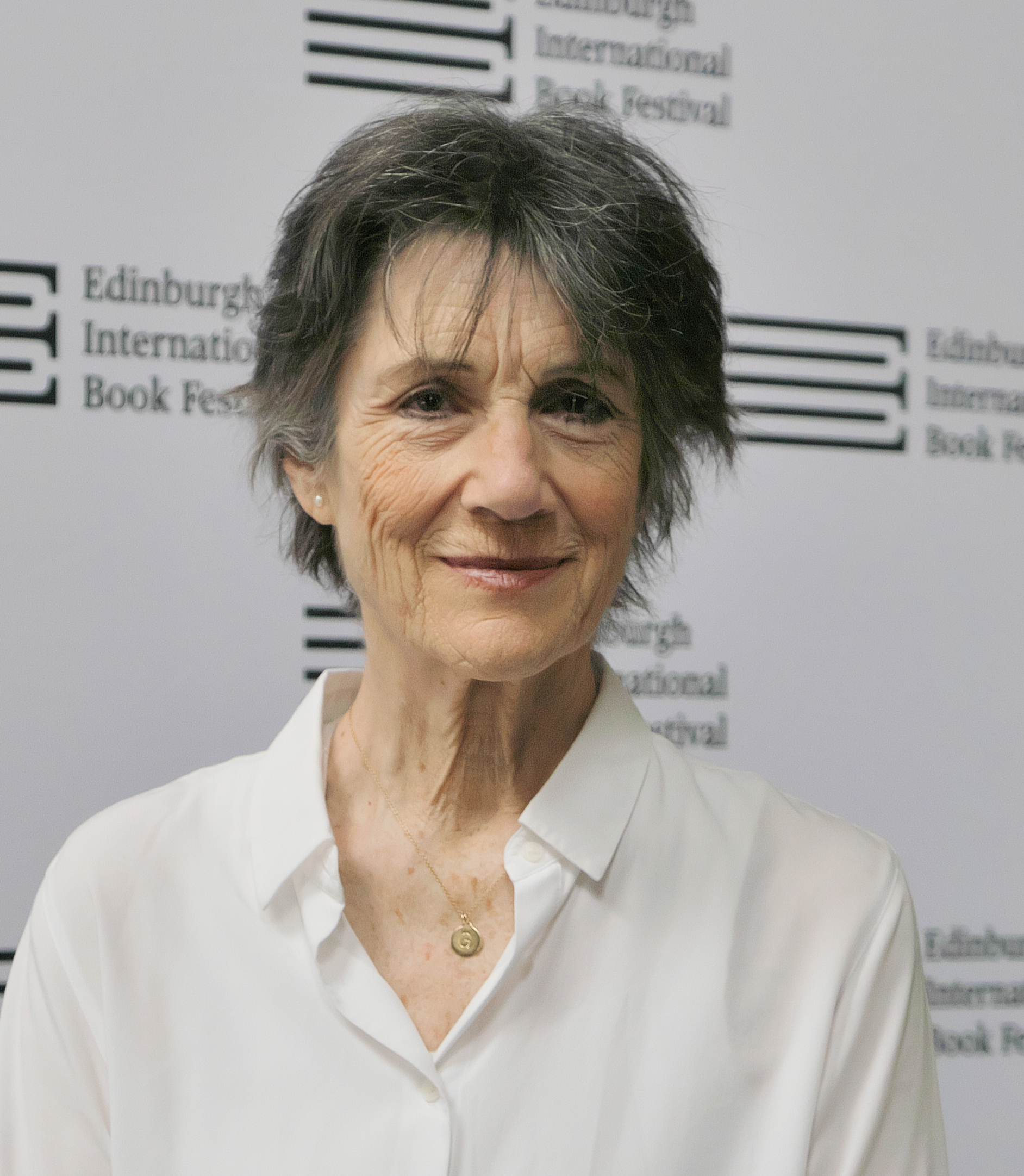
- Walter in 2025
- Born: Harriet Mary Walter; 24 September 1950 (age 76); London, England
- Education: London Academy of Music and Dramatic Art (BA)
- Occupation: Actress
- Years active: 1974–present
- Spouse: Guy Paul (m. 2011)
- Partner: Peter Blythe (1996–2004; his death)
- Relatives: Christopher Lee (maternal uncle); Marie Carandini (great-great-grandmother)

Dame Harriet Mary Walter (born 24 September 1950) is an English actor of stage and screen. She is known for her role as Natalie Chandler in the ITV drama series Law & Order: UK from 2009 to 2014, and in the Hollywood blockbuster Star Wars: The Force Awakens (2015), among other film and television roles.

Walter began her career performing on stage with the Royal Shakespeare Company in productions of Twelfth Night (1987–88) and Three Sisters (1988), for which she received the Olivier Award for Best Actress. She received Olivier Award nominations for Life x 3 (2001), and Mary Stuart (2006). Her other notable work for the RSC includes leading roles in Macbeth (1999) and Antony and Cleopatra (2006). She made her Broadway debut in the 1983 revival of the William Shakespeare play All's Well That Ends Well (1983), returning to Broadway in Mary Stuart. She reprised her roles of Brutus in Julius Caesar (2012) and the title role in Henry IV (2014), as well as playing Prospero in The Tempest, as part of an all-female Shakespeare trilogy in 2016.

Walter has acted in the films Sense and Sensibility (1995), The Governess (1998), Atonement (2007), The Young Victoria (2009), A Royal Affair (2012), Denial (2016), The Sense of an Ending (2017), Rocketman (2019), and The Last Duel (2021). On television she starred as Harriet Vane in the 1987 BBC Wimsey dramatisations and also appeared in Downton Abbey (2013–15), London Spy (2015), The Crown (2016), Patrick Melrose (2018), Killing Eve (2020), and Silo (2023–present).

She has received an Olivier Award and nominations for a Tony Award, five Emmy Awards, and a Screen Actors Guild Award. She also earned BAFTA TV Awards nominations for her roles in Succession (2018–2023) and Ted Lasso (2020–2023). In 2011, Walter was appointed Dame Commander of the Order of the British Empire (DBE) for services to drama.

== Early life and education ==
Harriet Walter was born in London, England on 24 September 1950. Her father was Roderick Walter and her mother Xandra Carandini Lee. Xandra was the elder sister of British actor Sir Christopher Lee, making Harriet his niece. This part of the family has Italian origins. On her father's side, Harriet is a great-great-great-great-granddaughter of John Walter, founder of The Times.

In 2026, Walter participated in an episode of the BBC family history television series Who Do You Think You Are?, focusing on her maternal family line, as the Walter family is already documented. During the episode, she learned of her mother's work during World War II for the Naval Intelligence Division, managing the intelligence team responsible for naval intelligence ahead of the D-Day Normandy landings. Walter also explored her direct descent from the English-born Australian opera singer Marie Carandini and an Italian marquis.

Walter was educated at Cranborne Chase School. After turning down a university education, she was rejected by five drama schools before being admitted to the London Academy of Music and Dramatic Art. Following her training, she gained early experience with the Joint Stock Theatre Company, Paines Plough touring, and the Duke's Playhouse, Lancaster.

== Career ==
Walter appeared in the Royal Shakespeare Company (RSC) productions Nicholas Nickleby (1980), A Midsummer Night's Dream (1981), All's Well That Ends Well (1981), The Castle (1985), A Question of Geography (1988), Twelfth Night (1988), Three Sisters (1988), The Duchess of Malfi (1989), Macbeth (1999), Much Ado about Nothing (2002), and Death of a Salesman (2015).

In 1987, Walter was made an associate artist of the RSC. Additional theatre work includes Three Birds Alighting on a Field (1991, 1993), Arcadia (1993), Hedda Gabler (1996), Ivanov (1997), and Mary Stuart (2005).

Walter made her Broadway debut in 1983, when the RSC production of All's Well That Ends Well transferred there. In 1993, she starred as Biddy in the off-Broadway production of Three Birds Alighting on a Field, for which she received a Drama Desk Award nomination. She returned to the Broadway stage in 2009, when she reprised her role in Mary Stuart. In 2014, Walter starred as Brutus in an all-female off-Broadway production of Julius Caesar and received her second nomination for Drama Desk Award for Outstanding Actress in a Play.

Walter's films include Sense and Sensibility (1995), Bedrooms and Hallways (1998), The Governess (1998), Onegin (1999), Villa des Roses (2002), and Bright Young Things (2003). In 1987, she portrayed Harriet Vane in three instalments of the BBC's A Dorothy L. Sayers Mystery, and played Detective Inspector Natalie Chandler from 2009 to 2012 in the ITV drama series Law & Order: UK. Other television roles include Waking the Dead (2001), Little Dorrit (2008), A Short Stay in Switzerland (2009), and Lady Shackleton in the series Downton Abbey (2013–15).

Walter played Brutus in Julius Caesar in 2012, and the title role in Henry IV in 2014, in all-female productions at the Donmar Warehouse. Both productions transferred to Brooklyn's St. Ann's Warehouse in New York. She was set to reprise both roles, as well as playing Prospero in an all-female production of The Tempest, as part of director Phyllida Lloyd's Shakespeare trilogy at the Donmar's temporary, in-the-round, 420-seat theatre next to King's Cross station in 2016.

In 2016, Walter played Clementine Churchill on the Netflix series The Crown, appeared in two episodes in 2017 in Call the Midwife, and had a recurring role on the HBO series Succession (2018–23). She portrayed the Tudor matriarch Margaret Beaufort in the series The Spanish Princess. In 2020, Walter joined the series Killing Eve.

In 2022, Walter played a recurring role as Veronique in British medical comedy-drama miniseries This Is Going to Hurt (2022). She starred as Martha Walker in the Apple TV American science fiction dystopian drama television series Silo (2023-2026).

On 14 January 2025 Walter announced that filming had begun for Paramount+ series Playing Gracie Darling, in which she plays the role of Pattie. She played Margaret Thatcher in two episodes of Brian and Maggie (2025).

== Personal life ==
Walter was in a relationship with actor Peter Blythe from 1996 until his death in 2004. She married actor Guy Paul in 2011.

At the age of 20, Walter became a feminist and went "into political theatre; to try and put as much feminism into the interpretation of parts I was playing". She was conflicted on her damehood and nearly turned it down, but eventually decided to accept because "there are many fewer women [than men] who can sustain a career to the point where they can be named a Dame, and that's not through lack of talent. It was a slightly political gesture".

She supported the UK remaining in the European Union in the run-up to the 2016 EU referendum.

Walter, who speaks Russian, gave a reading at the 2022 Poets for Ukraine event alongside Juliet Stevenson, Meera Syal, and others. Shortly after the beginning of the 2023 Gaza war, Walter was one of over 2,000 to sign an Artists for Palestine letter calling for a ceasefire and accusing western governments of "not only tolerating war crimes but aiding and abetting them". She condemned the decision to rescind Caryl Churchill's 2022 European Drama Lifetime Achievement Award over Churchill's support of Palestine and alleged anti-semitism.

Walter is a patron of the Shakespeare Schools Festival, a charity that enables school children across the UK to perform Shakespeare in professional theatres; Prisoners Abroad, a charity that supports Britons imprisoned overseas and their families; and Clean Break, a charity and theatre company dedicated to sharing the stories of imprisoned women and transforming the lives of female offenders through theatre education.

== Acting credits ==
=== Film ===
Year	Title	Role	Notes
1984	Reflections	Ottilie Garinger	
1985	The Good Father	Emmy Hooper	
1985	Turtle Diary	Harriet Simms	
1990	May Fools	Lily	
1993	The Hour of the Pig	Jeannie Martin	
1995	Sense and Sensibility	Fanny Dashwood	
1996	The Leading Man	Liz Flett	
1997	Keep the Aspidistra Flying	Julia Comstock	
1998	Bedrooms and Hallways	Sybil	
1998	The Governess	Mrs. Cavendish	
1999	Onegin	Madame Larina	
2002	Villa des Roses	Olive Burrell	bifa best actress (nom)
2003	Bright Young Things	Lady Maitland	
2005	Chromophobia	Penelope Aylesbury	
2006	Babel	Lilly	
2007	Atonement	Emily Tallis	
2008	Broken Lines	Leah	
2009	Chéri	La Loupiote	
2009	The Young Victoria	Queen Adelaide	
2009	Morris: A Life with Bells On	Professor Compton Chamberlayne	
2009	From Time to Time	Lady Dresham	
2012	A Royal Affair	Augusta of Saxe-Gotha	
2012	The Wedding Video	Alex	
2014	Suite Française	Viscountess de Montmort	
2015	Man Up	Fran	
2015	Star Wars: The Force Awakens	Kalonia	
2016	Denial	Vera Reich	
2016	Mindhorn	Agent	
2017	The Sense of an Ending	Margaret	
2019	Rocketman	Helena Piena	
2020	Herself	Peggy	
2021	The Last Duel	Nicole de Buchard	
2022	Your Christmas or Mine?	Iris	
2022	Burial	Anna Marshall	
2024	And Mrs	Amanda	
2024	The Life and Deaths of Christopher Lee	Herself	Documentary film
2026	Shelter	Prime Minister Fordham	

=== Television ===
Year	Title	Role	Notes
1979	Rebecca	Clarice	Episode #1.3
1980	The Imitation Game	Cathy Raine	Television film
1981	The Cherry Orchard	Varya	Television film
1984	Amy	Amy Johnson	Television film
1985	The Price	Frances Carr	6 episodes
1986	Girls on Top	R.S.C. Actress 3	Episode: "Mr. Yummy Brownie"
1987	A Dorothy L. Sayers Mystery	Harriet Vane	Main cast, 10 episodes
1989	Theatre Night	Sheila	Episode: "Benefactors"
1991	Screen Two	Amelia Cleverly	Episode: "They Never Slept"
1991	The Men's Room	Charity Walton	Miniseries, 5 episodes
1991	Ashenden	Giulia Lazzari	Episode: "The Dark Woman"
1993	Inspector Morse	Dr. Esther Martin	Episode: "The Day of the Devil"
1993	Performance	Mrs. Dorothy Maitland	Episode: "The Maitlands"
1994	Hard Times	Rachel	4 episodes
1997	A Dance to the Music of Time	Mildred	Episode: "The Thirties"
1998–1999	Unfinished Business	Amy	Main cast, 12 episodes
1999	Dalziel and Pascoe	Mary Waddell	Episode: "Time to Go"
1999	The Magical Legend of the Leprechauns	Queen Morag	Television film
2001	Waking the Dead	Annie Keel	Episode: "A Simple Sacrifice"
2003	My Uncle Silas	Pamela Farrell	Episode: "Shandy Lil"
2004	London	Virginia Woolf	2 episodes
2004	Imagine	Mother	Episode: "The Smoking Diaries"
2004	Spooks	Deep Throat	Episode: "Who Guards the Guards?"
2005	New Tricks	Madeline	Episode: "Trust Me"
2005	Messiah	Professor Robb	3 episodes
2005	Midsomer Murders	Margaret Winstanley	Episode: "Orchis Fatalis"
2006	Agatha Christie's Marple	Duchess of Malfi	Episode: "Sleeping Murder"
2006	Doctors	Annie Fenton	4 episodes
2007	Trial & Retribution	The Judge	Episode: "Paradise Lost: Part 1"
2007	Five Days	ACC Jennie Griffin	3 episodes
2007	Ballet Shoes	Dr. Smith	Television film
2008	The Palace	Joanna Woodward	Episode #1.1
2008	Fairy Tales	Charlotte Brooks	Episode: "Cinderella"
2008	10 Days to War	Anne Campbell	Episode: "Failure Is Not an Option"
2008	Agatha Christie's Poirot	Miss Bulstrode	Episode: "Cat Among the Pigeons"
2008	Little Dorrit	Mrs. Gowan	Miniseries, 4 episodes
2009	Hunter	ACC Jenny Griffin	Miniseries, 2 episodes
2009	A Short Stay in Switzerland	Clare	Television film
2009–2014	Law & Order: UK	Natalie Chandler	Main cast, 40 episodes
2013	Midsomer Murders	Diana Davenport	Episode: "Death and the Divas"
2013	Heading Out	Angela	2 episodes
2013	By Any Means	Sally Walker	Episode #1.4
2013–2015	Downton Abbey	Lady Shackleton	Recurring role, 4 episodes
2014	The Assets	Jeanne Vertefeuille	Miniseries, 8 episodes
2015	London Spy	Claire	Miniseries, 3 episodes
2016	The Crown	Clementine Churchill	Recurring role, 6 episodes
2017	Call the Midwife	Sister Ursula	3 episodes
2017	Black Sails	Marion Guthrie	3 episodes
2018	Patrick Melrose	Princess Margaret	Episode: "Some Hope"
2018	Flowers	Hylda	Main cast, 5 episodes
2018	Black Earth Rising	Eve Ashby	2 episodes
2018	My Dinner with Hervé	Baskin	Television film
2018–2023	Succession	Lady Caroline Collingwood	7 episodes
2019	Curfew	Helen Newman	4 episodes
2019	The Spanish Princess	Lady Margaret Beaufort	Miniseries, 8 episodes
2020	The End	Edie	10 episodes
2020	Belgravia	Caroline, Countess of Brockenhurst	6 episodes
2020	Killing Eve	Dasha	7 episodes
2020	Talking Heads	Muriel	Episode: "Soldiering On"
2021	Doctor Who	Prime Minister Jo Patterson	Episode: "Revolution of the Daleks"
2021–present	Ted Lasso	Deborah Welton	5 episodes
2022	Documentary Now!	Edwina	Episode: "Two Hairdressers in Bagglyport"
2022	This Is Going to Hurt	Veronique	Recurring character
2023	The Cleaner	Lisa	Episode: "The Transaction"
2023	Archie	Elsie Leach	3 episodes
2023–present	Silo	Martha Walker	Main cast
2024	Wolf Hall: The Mirror and the Light	Lady Margaret Pole	Episode: "Wreckage"
2025	Brian and Maggie	Margaret Thatcher	2 episodes
2025	Black Mirror	Judith Keyworth	Episode: "Hotel Reverie"
2025	Playing Gracie Darling	Pattie	
2026	Ponies	Manya Caplan	Recurring character
2026	Maya	Nancy	Filming
	Youth	Livonia	Recurring character

=== Theatre ===
- 1979, Royal Shakespeare Company, A Midsummer Night's Dream
- 1981/82, Royal Shakespeare Company, Helena in All's Well That Ends Well
- 1981/82, Royal Shakespeare Company, Winnifrede in The Witch of Edmonton
- 1983, Martin Beck Theatre (Broadway transfer), Helena in All's Well That Ends Well
- 1985, Royal Shakespeare Company, Skinner in The Castle
- 1987/88, Royal Shakespeare Company, Imogen in Cymbeline
- 1987/88, Royal Shakespeare Company, Viola in Twelfth Night
- 1987/88, Royal Shakespeare Company, Dacha in A Question of Geography
- 1988, Royal Shakespeare Company, Masha in Chekhov's Three Sisters
- 1989/90, Royal Shakespeare Company, Duchess in John Webster's The Duchess of Malfi
- 1991, Royal Court Theatre (and off-Broadway transfer 1993), Biddy in Timberlake Wertenbaker's Three Birds Alighting on a Field
- 1993, Royal National Theatre, Lady Croom in the premiere run of Arcadia by Tom Stoppard
- 1993, Queen Elizabeth Hall, title role in Benda's Medea, with the Orchestra of the Age of Enlightenment conducted by Iván Fischer
- 1999, Royal Shakespeare Company, Lady Macbeth in Macbeth
- 2000, Royal National Theatre and The Old Vic, Sonia in UK premiere of Life x 3
- 2002, Royal National Theatre, Paige in the premiere production of Dinner by Moira Buffini
- 2005, Donmar Warehouse and Apollo Theatre (West End), Elizabeth I in Mary Stuart by Schiller
- 2006, Royal Shakespeare Company, Antony and Cleopatra
- 2009, Broadhurst Theatre (Broadway transfer), Elizabeth I in Mary Stuart
- 2010, Royal National Theatre, Women Beware Women
- 2012/13, Donmar Warehouse (and off-Broadway transfer), Brutus in Julius Caesar
- 2014, Donmar Warehouse (and off-Broadway transfer), King Henry IV in Henry IV
- 2015, Royal Shakespeare Company and the Noël Coward Theatre, Linda Loman in Death of a Salesman
- 2016, Donmar Warehouse, Prospero in The Tempest

=== Audio ===
- Jeremy Hardy Speaks to the Nation
- The Vortex by Noël Coward as Florence Lancaster, BBC Radio 3, 2 January 2000
- Scenes of Seduction as Catherine, radio play written by Timberlake Wertenbaker and directed by Ned Chaillet, broadcast on BBC Radio 4 7 March 2005
- Desmond Olivier Dingle as herself, broadcast on BBC7 on 28 February 2007, episode 2 of 6, duration 30 minutes
- The Arts and How they was done as herself, broadcast on BBC Radio 4 between 4 April and 9 May 2007, episodes 1 and 6 out of 6, duration 30 minutes
- I, Claudius as Livia, wife of Augustus, broadcast on BBC Radio 4 December 2010
- Desert Island Discs as herself on BBC Radio 4, guested on 26 June 2011
- Time and the Conways as Mrs. Conway in BBC Radio 3's adaptation of J.B. Priestley's play, broadcast on 14 September 2014
- The Mysterious Affair at Styles as Emily Inglethorp, a 2024 Audible original

== Honours ==
She was appointed Commander of the Order of the British Empire (CBE) in the 2000 New Year Honours and promoted to Dame Commander of the Order of the British Empire (DBE) in the 2011 New Year Honours for services to drama.

In 2001 she and Kenneth Branagh were both given honorary doctorates and honorary fellowships at the Shakespeare Institute in Stratford.

Year	Award	Category	Work	Result	Ref.
1985	Laurence Olivier	Actress of the Year	The Castle	Nominated	
1988	Laurence Olivier	Best Actress in a Revival	A Question of Geography / Twelfth Night / Three Sisters	Won	
2002	British Independent Film Awards	BIFA Best Actress	Villa des Roses	Nominated	
1994	Drama Desk Award	Outstanding Actress in a Play	Three Birds Alighting on a Field	Nominated	
2001	Laurence Olivier Award	Best Actress	Life x 3	Nominated	
2005	Evening Standard Award	Best Actress	Mary Stuart	Won	
2006	Laurence Olivier Award	Best Actress	Mary Stuart	Nominated	
2009	Tony Award	Best Actress in a Play	Mary Stuart	Nominated	
2014	Drama Desk Award	Outstanding Actress in a Play	Julius Caesar	Nominated	
2020	Primetime Emmy Award	Outstanding Guest Actress in a Drama Series	Succession	Nominated	
2022	Primetime Emmy Award	Outstanding Guest Actress in a Drama Series	Succession	Nominated	
2022	Primetime Emmy Award	Outstanding Guest Actress in a Comedy Series	Ted Lasso	Nominated	
2023	Primetime Emmy Award	Outstanding Guest Actress in a Comedy Series	Ted Lasso	Nominated	
2023	Primetime Emmy Award	Outstanding Guest Actress in a Drama Series	Succession	Nominated	
2024	BAFTA TV Awards	BAFTA Best Supporting Actress TV	Succession	Nominated	

== Bibliography ==
- Clamorous Voices: Shakespeare's Women Today (1988). Women's Press, ISBN 0-7043-4145-X.
- Players of Shakespeare 3 (1994). Cambridge University Press, ISBN 978-0-521-47734-5.
- Macbeth (Actors on Shakespeare) (2002). Faber and Faber, London. ISBN 0-571-21407-X
- Other People's Shoes (2003). Nick Hern Books, London. ISBN 1-85459-751-5. Autobiography.
- Facing It, Reflections on Images of Older Women (2010). Self Published, London. ISBN 978-0-9566497-1-3
- Brutus and Other Heroines: Playing Shakespeare's Roles for Women (2016). Nick Hern Books, London. ISBN 978-1-84842-293-3
- She Speaks!: What Shakespeare's Women Might Have Said (2025). Virago, London. ISBN 978-0349020433
