= Busman's Honeymoon =

1937 mystery novel by Dorothy L. Sayers

- First edition
- Author: Dorothy L. Sayers
- Language: English
- Series: Lord Peter Wimsey
- Genre: Mystery, Detective novel
- Publisher: Gollancz
- Publication date: 1937
- Publication place: United Kingdom
- Media type: Print
- Preceded by: Gaudy Night

Busman's Honeymoon is a 1937 novel by Dorothy L. Sayers, her eleventh and last featuring Lord Peter Wimsey, and her fourth and last to feature Harriet Vane.

== Plot introduction ==
Lord Peter Wimsey and Harriet Vane marry and go to spend their honeymoon at Talboys, an old farmhouse in Hertfordshire which he has bought her as a present. The honeymoon is intended as a break from his usual routine of solving crimes, and hers of writing about them, but it turns into a murder investigation when the seller of the house is found dead at the bottom of the cellar steps with severe head injuries.

== Plot ==
After an engagement of some months following the events at the end of Gaudy Night, Lord Peter Wimsey and Harriet Vane marry. They plan to spend their honeymoon at Talboys, an old farmhouse in Harriet's native Hertfordshire which Wimsey has bought for her, and they abscond from the wedding reception, evading the assembled reporters.

Arriving late at night, they are surprised to find the house locked up and not prepared for them. They gain access and spend their wedding night there, but next morning the former owner, Noakes, is found dead in the cellar with head injuries. The quiet honeymoon is ruined as a murder investigation begins and the house fills with policemen, reporters, and brokers' men distraining Noakes' hideous furniture. The investigation is complicated by the fact that the body was not discovered until after the house had begun to be cleaned, potentially destroying evidence.

Noakes was an unpopular man, a miser and (it turns out) a blackmailer. He was assumed to be well off, but it transpires that he was bankrupt, owed large amounts of money, and was planning to flee his creditors with the cash he had received for Talboys. The house had been locked and bolted when the newly-weds arrived, and medical evidence seems to rule out an accident, so it seems he was attacked in the house and died later, having somehow locked up after his attacker. The suspects include Noakes' niece Aggie Twitterton; Mrs Ruddle, his neighbour and cleaning lady; Frank Crutchley, a local garage mechanic who also tended Noakes' garden; and the local police constable, Joe Sellon, who was his blackmail victim. Suspicion centers on Sellon after he claims to have seen Noakes' clock from outside the house, while in fact a large potted cactus blocks view of the clock from the window.

Peter and Harriet's relationship is resolved during the process of catching the murderer and bringing him to justice. In a final scene, in which almost the entire cast of characters is gathered in the front room of Talboys, the killer turns out to be Crutchley. He had planned to marry Miss Twitterton to get his hands on the money Noakes had supposedly left her in his will. He had set a booby trap by suspending the cactus pot near the ceiling; when the victim opened the radio cabinet after locking up for the night, he triggered the trap, causing the heavy pot to swing down and strike his head.

The final chapters of the book are dominated by Wimsey's reaction to the case – his arrangement for Crutchley to be represented by top defence counsel; his guilt at condemning a man to be hanged; and the return of his shell-shock; the book ends with him coming to Harriet for comfort as the hour of Crutchley's execution approaches.

== Later writings ==
Sayers completed no further Wimsey novels after Busman's Honeymoon, though she did begin work on a story titled Thrones, Dominations, which would be completed years after her death by Jill Paton Walsh.

The 1942 short story Talboys, the very last Wimsey fiction published by Sayers, is both a sequel to the present book, in having the same location and some of the same village characters, and an antithesis in being lighthearted and having no crime worse than the theft of some peaches from a neighbour's garden.

== Principal characters ==
- Lord Peter Wimsey – protagonist, an aristocratic amateur detective
- Harriet Vane, Lady Peter Wimsey – protagonist, a mystery writer, wife of Lord Peter
- Mervyn Bunter – Lord Peter's manservant
- Honoria Lucasta, Dowager Duchess of Denver – Lord Peter's mother
- William Noakes – previous owner of Talboys and the murder victim
- Miss Agnes Twitterton – spinster niece of the murdered man
- Frank Crutchley – motor mechanic and gardener
- Mrs Martha Ruddle – neighbour of Noakes and his cleaning lady
- Bert Ruddle – her son, farm labourer
- Chief Superintendent Kirk – Hertfordshire CID
- Joseph Sellon – local police constable
- The Reverend Simon Goodacre – Vicar of Paggleham

== Title ==
A "busman's holiday" is a holiday spent by a bus driver travelling on a bus: it is no break from the usual routine. By analogy, anyone who spends a holiday doing their normal job is taking a "busman's holiday".

== Literary significance and criticism ==
In their review of Crime novels (revised edn 1989), the US writers Barzun and Taylor comment that the novel is "Not near the top of her form, but remarkable as a treatment of the newly wedded and bedded pair of eccentrics ... with Bunter in the offing and three local characters, chiefly comic. Peter's mother – Dowager Duchess of Denver – Peter's sister, John Donne, a case of vintage port, and the handling of "corroded sut" provide plenty of garnishing for an indifferent murder, even if we weren't also given an idea of Lord Peter's sexual tastes and powers under trying circumstances."

Raymond Chandler, in his essay "The Simple Art of Murder," satirized a number of classic detective stories, and he chose this one among Sayers's novels to mock for the complicated murder method: "a murderer who needs that much help from Providence must be in the wrong business"

== Adaptations ==
Busman's Honeymoon first saw the light of day as a stage play by Sayers and Muriel St. Clare Byrne. Subtitled A Detective Comedy in Three Acts, it opened at London's Comedy Theatre, in December 1936, with Dennis Arundell as Peter and Veronica Turleigh as Harriet Vane. The play was a success, and ran for 413 performances.

A 1940 film version, based as much on the play as on the novel, stars Robert Montgomery as Peter and Constance Cummings as Harriet. The movie was released in the United States as Haunted Honeymoon.

It was twice adapted for BBC television broadcast. The 1947 adaptation, 90 minutes in length, was directed by John Glyn-Jones and starred Harold Warrender as Lord Peter, Ruth Lodge as Harriet, and Ronald Adam as Bunter; Joan Hickson, later to be better known for playing Agatha Christie's amateur sleuth Miss Marple, played Miss Twitterton. The 1957 adaptation, again 90 minutes in length, was directed by Brandon Acton-Bond, and starred Peter Gray as Lord Peter, Sarah Lawson as Harriet, and Charles Lloyd-Pack as Bunter.

There have been three BBC radio adaptations. The first, in 1949, was adapted for radio by Peggy Wells, and starred Hugh Latimer as Lord Peter, Rita Vale as Harriet, and Stanley Groome as Bunter. The second, again adapted for radio by Wells, was broadcast in 1965, and featured Angus MacKay as Lord Peter, Dorothy Reynolds as Harriet, and David Monico as Bunter. The third adaptation, as part of a Lord Peter Wimsey radio series, broadcast in 1983 on BBC Radio 4, was in six parts. This starred Ian Carmichael as Lord Peter Wimsey, Sarah Badel as Harriet, Peter Jones as Bunter, Rosemary Leach as Miss Twitterton, Pearl Hackney as Mrs Ruddle, Peter Vaughan as Superintendent Kirk and John Westbrook as the Narrator.

A stage production of Busman's Honeymoon took place at the Lyric theatre, Hammersmith from 12 July - 27 August 1988 and starred Edward Petherbridge as Lord Peter Wimsey and Emily Richard as Harriet (Lady Peter) Wimsey. The two actors are married to each other in real life. (Petherbridge starred as Lord Peter in A Dorothy L. Sayers Mystery, a 1987 televised adaptation of all the Harriet Vane novels except Busman's Honeymoon for which the BBC could not obtain the rights).

Lifeline Theatre (Chicago, Illinois) presented an original adaptation of Busman's Honeymoon in the spring and summer of 2009. Frances Limoncelli adapted the script from Dorothy Sayers' novel. The show was directed by Paul Holmquist. Busman's Honeymoon was preceded by adaptations of Whose Body?, Strong Poison, and Gaudy Night (all adapted by Frances Limoncelli and produced at Lifeline Theatre).
