= Strong Poison =

1930 mystery novel by Dorothy L. Sayers

- First edition
- Author: Dorothy L. Sayers
- Language: English
- Series: Lord Peter Wimsey
- Genre: Mystery novel
- Publisher: Gollancz
- Publication date: 1930
- Publication place: United Kingdom
- Media type: Print
- Pages: 288
- Preceded by: The Unpleasantness at the Bellona Club
- Followed by: The Five Red Herrings

Strong Poison is a 1930 mystery novel by Dorothy L. Sayers, her fifth featuring Lord Peter Wimsey and the first in which Harriet Vane appears.

== Plot ==
The novel opens with mystery author Harriet Vane on trial in London for the murder of her former lover, Philip Boyes, a writer with strong views on atheism, anarchy, and free love. Publicly professing to disapprove of marriage, he had persuaded a reluctant Harriet to live with him, only to renounce his principles a year later and to propose. Harriet, outraged at being deceived, had broken off the relationship.

Following the separation, the former couple had met occasionally, and the evidence at trial pointed to Boyes suffering from repeated bouts of gastric illness at around the time that Harriet was buying poisons under assumed names, ostensibly as part of her research for a novel in progress.

Returning from a holiday in North Wales in better health, Boyes had dined with his cousin, the solicitor Norman Urquhart, before going to Harriet's flat to discuss reconciliation, where he had accepted a cup of coffee. That night he was taken fatally ill, apparently with gastritis. Foul play was eventually suspected, and a post-mortem revealed that Boyes had died from acute arsenic poisoning. Apart from Harriet's coffee and the evening meal with his cousin in which every item had been shared by two or more people, the victim appeared to have consumed nothing else that evening.

The trial results in a hung jury. As a unanimous verdict is required, the judge orders a re-trial. Lord Peter Wimsey visits Harriet in prison, declares his conviction of her innocence and promises to catch the real murderer. Wimsey also announces that he wishes to marry her, a suggestion that Harriet politely but firmly declines.

Working against time before the new trial, Wimsey first explores the possibility that Boyes killed himself. Evidence in favour of that theory emerges when a witness reports seeing Boyes ingest a white powder shortly before he was taken ill; but Wimsey's friend, Detective Inspector Charles Parker, discovers that the powder was merely bicarbonate of soda.

The rich great-aunt of the cousins Urquhart and Boyes, Rosanna Wrayburn, is now very old and close to death. Urquhart is acting as her family solicitor. He shows Wimsey a draft of Wrayburn’s will, which bequeaths most of her fortune to Urquhart himself, and nothing at all to Boyes. Wimsey suspects that the document is a forgery, and sends his enquiry agent Miss Climpson to get hold of Wrayburn's original will. She does so by passing herself off as a medium and holding a seance in which she convinces Wrayburn’s nurse that the will must be found. The actual will names Boyes as principal beneficiary.

A spy planted by Wimsey in Urquhart’s office, Miss Joan Murchison, finds evidence that Urquhart abused his position as Wrayburn's solicitor, embezzled her investments, then lost the money on the stock market; she also finds within the office a packet of arsenic hidden in a safe. Wimsey infers Urquhart’s motive for killing Boyes: he knew that his embezzlement would be exposed should Wrayburn die and Boyes claim his inheritance. However, if Boyes were to die first, nobody could challenge Urquhart as sole remaining beneficiary, and his fraud would not be revealed.

After perusing A. E. Housman's A Shropshire Lad, in which the poet likens the reading of serious poetry to King Mithridates' self-immunization against poisons, Wimsey suddenly understands what happened. Urquhart had administered the arsenic in an omelette which Boyes himself had cooked. Although Boyes and Urquhart had shared the dish, the latter was unaffected as he had carefully built up his own immunity beforehand by taking small doses of the poison over a long period. Wimsey tricks Urquhart into a confession by convincing him that he has ingested arsenic and noting that he does not behave like someone who believes he has been poisoned.

At Harriet's retrial, the prosecution presents no case and she is freed. Exhausted by her ordeal, she again rejects Wimsey's proposal of marriage, and he asks her friends to inform her that he will wait until she feels comfortable approaching him. Meanwhile, Wimsey persuades Parker to propose to his sister, Lady Mary, whom he has long admired. Freddy Arbuthnot, Wimsey's friend and stock market contact, announces his marriage to Rachel Levy, the daughter of the murder victim in Whose Body?.

== Principal characters ==
- Lord Peter Wimsey – protagonist, aristocrat and amateur detective
- Harriet Vane – author of detective fiction, accused of murdering Philip Boyes
- Philip Boyes – Harriet's former lover, now deceased
- Norman Urquhart – Solicitor and Boyes' cousin
- Rosanna Wrayburn, or "Cremorna Garden" – great-aunt of Boyes and Urquhart, formerly a stage performer of scandalous reputation, now senile and bedridden
- Caroline Booth, nurse to Mrs Wrayburn, believer in spiritualism
- Charles Parker – police detective, friend of Wimsey
- Miss Katharine Climpson – enquiry agent employed by Wimsey
- Miss Joan Murchison – enquiry agent, colleague of Miss Climpson
- Lady Mary Wimsey – Wimsey's younger sister, engaged to Parker
- The Hon. Freddy Arbuthnot – Wimsey's friend and stock market contact
- Marjorie Phelps – artist friend of Wimsey

== Title ==
The novel's title appears in some variants of the Anglo-Scottish border ballad Lord Rendal whose title character was poisoned by his lover:

"What did you have for your breakfast, my own pretty boy?
What did you have for your breakfast, my comfort and joy?"
"A cup of strong poison; mother, make my bed soon,
There's a pain in my heart, and I mean to lie down."

== Literary significance and criticism ==
In their review of crime novels (1989 edition), the US writers Barzun and Taylor called the novel "highest among the masterpieces. It has the strongest possible element of suspense – curiosity and the feeling one shares with Wimsey for Harriet Vane. The clues, the enigma, the free-love question, and the order of telling could not be improved upon. As for the somber opening, with the judge's comments on how to make an omelet, it is sheer genius." In 1990, Strong Poison was placed 67th in The Top 100 Crime Novels of All Time, a ranking by the members (all crime writers) of the Crime Writers' Association in Britain. A similar ranking was made in 1995 by the Mystery Writers of America, putting this novel in 36th place.

The effect of arsenic as described in the novel was accepted by the science of the time, but it is now believed that long-term consumption would in fact have caused many health problems. This is reflected in the 2013 Wimsey novel The Late Scholar.

== Adaptations ==
The novel was adapted for a BBC television series in 1987 starring Edward Petherbridge as Lord Peter and Harriet Walter as Harriet Vane.

It has been adapted for radio four times:

| Broadcast | Lord Peter | Harriet Vane | Charles Parker | Adaption |
|---|---|---|---|---|
| 25 Sep 1963 | Frank Duncan | Mary Wimbush | Timothy West | Felix Felton |
| 17 May 1976 | Ian Carmichael | Ann Bell | Gabriel Woolf | Chris Miller |
| 2 Oct 1999 | Simon Russell Beale | Emma Fielding | Nicholas Farrell | Michael Bakewell |
| 8 November 2026 | Harry Lloyd | Clare Corbett | Nicholas Boulton | Stephen Sheridan |

== Background ==
While Sayers was working on her first novel, Whose Body?, she began a relationship with John Cournos, a writer of Russian-Jewish background. Cournos was an advocate of free love: he did not believe in marriage and did not want children. Cournos pressed Sayers to have sex with contraception, but she, a High Anglican, resisted to avoid what she called "the taint of the rubber shop". Their relationship foundered on the mismatch of expectations, and within two years Cournos – apparently not believing in the ideas he had professed – had married somebody else. Both Sayers and Cournos later wrote fictionalised versions of their relationship: Sayers in Strong Poison (1930) and Cournos in The Devil Is an English Gentleman (1932).
