= The Nine Tailors =

1934 mystery novel by Dorothy L Sayers

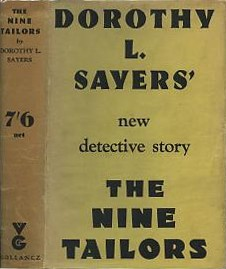
- First edition
- Author: Dorothy L. Sayers
- Language: English
- Series: Lord Peter Wimsey
- Genre: Mystery novel
- Publisher: Gollancz
- Publication date: 1934
- Publication place: United Kingdom
- Media type: Print
- Pages: 350
- Preceded by: Murder Must Advertise
- Followed by: Gaudy Night

The Nine Tailors is a 1934 mystery novel by the British writer Dorothy L. Sayers, her ninth featuring Lord Peter Wimsey. The story is set in the Lincolnshire Fens, and revolves around a group of bell-ringers at the local parish church. The book has been described as Sayers' finest literary achievement, although not all critics were convinced by the mode of death, nor by the amount of technical campanology detail included.

== Plot ==
Twenty years before the events of the novel, the family of Sir Henry Thorpe, squire of the Fenland village of Fenchurch St Paul, suffered the theft of a guest's valuable emerald necklace. The family's butler, Geoffrey Deacon, and his accomplice, Nobby Cranton, were convicted and imprisoned, but the emeralds were never recovered. In 1918, Deacon escaped from prison and disappeared, leaving his wife, Mary, none the wiser. After a man's body in prison clothes was found two years later in a nearby dene-hole, Mary was declared a widow, and married one of the village bell-ringers, William Thoday.

The novel opens with Lord Peter Wimsey running his car into a ditch near Fenchurch on a snowy New Year's Eve. Stranded for a few days while repairs are carried out, Wimsey helps ring an all-night peal on the church bells, filling in for William Thoday, who is ill with influenza. Lady Thorpe, Sir Henry's wife, dies the next day.

When Sir Henry dies the following Easter, a man's mutilated body is found in his wife's grave, believed to be that of a labourer calling himself 'Stephen Driver'. Oddly, the dead man was wearing French-made underclothes. The rector writes to Wimsey asking him to return to investigate.

At the Post Office, Bunter, Wimsey's manservant, finds an uncollected letter posted from France. The writer is the French wife of a British soldier, Arthur Cobbleigh, who had deserted in 1918. Cobbleigh evidently knew where the emeralds were hidden and plotted to recover them with 'Driver' – who is revealed to be not the mutilated man, but Cranton.

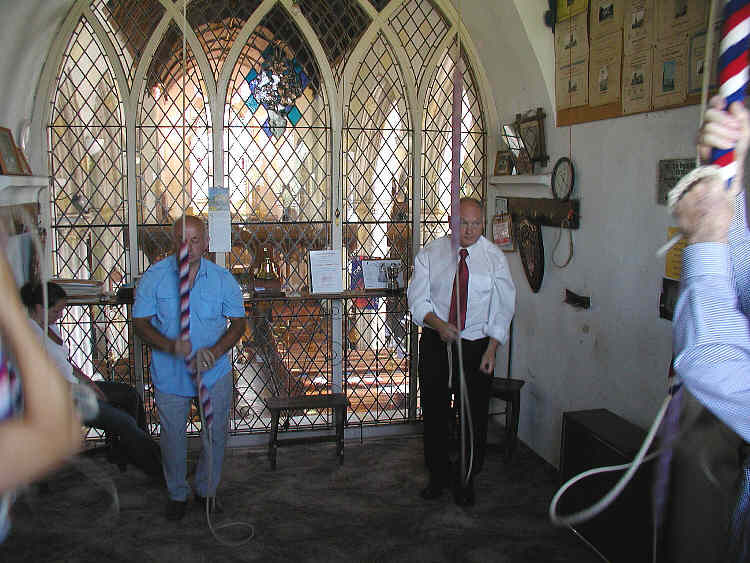
Bell-ringing in Stoke Gabriel parish church, Devon – similar to the change ringing described in the book

A document found in the bell chamber is a cipher, written on the same paper as the letter from France. Wimsey's knowledge of change ringing enables him to decipher it, leading him to the emeralds, still in their hiding place in the church. He shows the document to Mary Thoday, and she and William promptly abscond to London. Wimsey deduces that Mary recognised the handwriting as that of Deacon, her first husband, who apparently was still alive at the time of the cipher's composition. Realising their marriage was unintentionally bigamous, the Thodays have gone to get remarried.

Wimsey further deduces that the mutilated man was Deacon. After his escape, Deacon had killed Cobbleigh and swapped clothes and identities with him, leaving him in the dene-hole. After marrying bigamously in France, Deacon had waited several years to return for the emeralds that he had hidden before his arrest. He had asked Cranton for help, sending him the cipher as a token of good faith. Cranton had broken into the church, discovered Deacon's body in the bell chamber, and fled in horror.

William Thoday and his brother Jim, a merchant seaman, are interviewed. William confesses that on 30 December he had encountered Deacon, whom he had long believed to be dead, prowling around the church. Desperate to protect his wife and children from the scandal of an illegitimate marriage, he had tied Deacon up and locked him in the bell chamber, planning to bribe him to leave the country the next day. Unfortunately, his bout of influenza prevented him from returning, and Jim discovered Deacon's dead body still tied up two days later. Still loyal to his brother, Jim had made the body unrecognisable, hidden it in Lady Thorpe's grave, and returned to his ship. When the body was rediscovered at Easter, each of the brothers thought that the other had killed Deacon.

When Wimsey returns to Fenchurch the following Christmas, floods are threatening the countryside, and Wimsey climbs the tower as the bells are sounding the alarm. The appalling noise in the bell chamber convinces him that Deacon, tied there for hours during the all-night New Year peal, could not have survived: Deacon had been killed by the bells themselves. Wimsey explains, "We needn't look for a murderer now. Because the murderers of Geoffrey Deacon are hanging already, and a good deal higher than Haman". William Thoday is drowned in the flood trying to save another man. Wimsey speculates that "I think perhaps he guessed at last how Geoffrey Deacon died and felt himself responsible".

== Principal characters ==
- Lord Peter Wimsey
- Bunter, his manservant
- Superintendent Blundell
- Inspector Charles Parker at Scotland Yard
- The Reverend Theodore Venables, rector of Fenchurch St Paul
- Agnes Venables, the rector's wife
- Sir Henry Thorpe, the local squire
- Hilary Thorpe, Sir Henry's 15-year-old daughter
- Lady Thorpe, Sir Henry's deceased wife
- Mrs Wilbraham, cousin to Sir Henry Thorpe, original owner of the emerald necklace
- Geoffrey Deacon, once the Thorpes' butler, convicted of the theft of a necklace 20 years previously
- Nobby Cranton, London jewel-thief and Deacon's accomplice
- William Thoday, absent bell ringer, struck down with influenza
- Mary Russell Thoday, William Thoday's wife, previously married to Deacon
- James "Jim" Thoday, William's older brother, merchant seaman
- Orris "Potty" Peake, village idiot
- The bell ringers:
  - Hezekiah Lavender, leader, rings Bell No. 8, "Tailor Paul"
  - Jack Godfrey, churchwarden, rings Bell No. 7, "Batty Thomas"
  - Alfred "Alf" Donnington, landlord of the Red Cow inn, rings Bell No. 6, "Dimity"
  - Joe Hinkins, gardener, rings Bell No. 5, "Jubilee"
  - Harry Gotobed, sexton, rings Bell No. 4, "Jericho"
  - Walter "Wally" Pratt, trainee ringer, rings Bell No. 3, "John"
  - William "Will" Thoday, farm worker, and Lord Peter Wimsey, ring Bell No. 2, "Sabaoth"
  - Ezra Wilderspin, blacksmith, rings Bell No. 1, "Gaude"

== Title ==
The Nine Tailors of the book's title are taken from the old saying "Nine Tailors Make a Man", which Sayers quotes at the end of the novel. As explained by John Shand in his 1936 Spectator article The Bellringers' Art, "'Nine Tailors' means the nine strokes which at the beginning of the toll for the dead announce to the villagers that a man is dead. A woman's death is announced with 'Six Tailors'. Hence the old saying ... which might otherwise be construed as a slander on a worthy profession".

== Awards and nominations ==
In 1996 the British Crime Writers' Association awarded the story a Rusty Dagger award for the best crime novel of the 1930s, an award devised and organised for the Association by the noir writer, Russell James.

== Literary significance and criticism ==
Writing in The New York Times on the book's first publication, Isaac Anderson said, "It may be that you, like this reviewer, do not know the difference between a kent treble bob major and a grandsire triple, but even so, you will probably enjoy what Dorothy Sayers has to say about them and about other things concerned with the ancient art of change-ringing, since her dissertation is all woven into a most fascinating mystery tale.... This is, most emphatically, Dorothy Sayers at her very best."

John Shand, writing in The Spectator in 1936, said "Those who would appreciate an artist's picture of a group of village bellringers – of the kind who can pull a rope with any Londoner – may find one in [this novel], [which] contains the best description known to me of the bells, the ringers and the art. It is probably, indeed, the only novel based on a study of campanology. Its very title and chapter-headings pay tribute to the peculiar vocabulary of the art." Shand considered the means of death to be "Novelist's licence, I am afraid. But a trifle like that cannot spoil a good story."

In his 1941 book Murder for Pleasure: The Life and Times of the Detective Story, Howard Haycraft noted that Sayers has been called by some critics the greatest of living mystery writers. He went on, "Whether or not the reader agrees with this verdict, he can not, unless he is both obtuse and ungrateful, dispute her preëminence as one of the most brilliant and prescient artists the genre has yet produced... [This book is] in the writer's estimation her finest achievement and one of the truly great detective stories of all time."

Taking the opposite view, the American critic Edmund Wilson, in his excoriating 1945 essay attacking the entire genre of detective fiction, Who Cares Who Killed Roger Ackroyd?, criticised The Nine Tailors in particular for being dull, overlong and far too detailed. He considered the bell-ringing prose to be "a lot of information of the kind that you might expect to find in an encyclopaedia article on campanology". In his view, Sayers does not, really, write very well: "it is simply that she is more consciously literary than most of the other detective story-writers and that she thus attracts attention in a field which is mostly on a sub-literary level."

Sayers' obituarist, writing in The New York Times in 1957, noted that many critics regarded The Nine Tailors as her finest literary achievement.

In their review of crime novels (revised edn 1989), the American writers Barzun and Taylor called this novel "For many reasons, no great favourite... despite Dorothy's swotting up of bell-ringing and the two good maps. The cause of death, however, is original, and the rescue scene in the church amid the flood shows the hand of the master. It should be added that this work is a favourite with many readers. Sinclair Lewis judged it the best of his four 'indispensables'. "

Also writing in 1989, H. R. F. Keating said that the author "incautiously entered the closed world of bell-ringing in The Nine Tailors on the strength of a sixpenny pamphlet picked up by chance – and invented a method of killing which would not produce death, as well as breaking a fundamental rule of that esoteric art by allowing a relief ringer to take part in her famous nine-hour champion peal." In 1990, The Nine Tailors was placed eighteenth in The Top 100 Crime Novels of All Time, a ranking by the members (all crime writers) of the Crime Writers' Association in Britain. A similar ranking was made in 1995 by the Mystery Writers of America, putting this novel in twenty-eighth place.

== Background ==
As a child and young teenager, Sayers lived on the southern edge of the Fens at Bluntisham-cum-Earith, where her father was rector. She also was inspired by her father's restoration of the Bluntisham church bells in 1910.

Much of the technical detail of the novel was taken from Charles Troyte's Change Ringing, quotations from which are placed at the start of many of the chapters. In a letter discussing the book, Sayers said "I wrote [the novel] without ever having seen bells rung, by brooding over Troyte on Change-Ringing and trying to translate its technical descriptions into visual effects. That ... 'came out' beyond expectation".

== Adaptations ==
The Nine Tailors has been adapted several times for BBC Radio: as a four-part serialisation by Giles Cooper for the BBC Light Programme in 1954, with Alan Wheatley as Lord Peter Wimsey; as an eight-part adaptation by Alistair Beaton for Radio 4 in 1980, with Ian Carmichael as Wimsey; and as a single two-hour Murder for Christmas programme by Michelene Wandor in 1987, with Gary Bond as Wimsey.

In 1974 the novel was adapted for BBC television by Anthony Steven as a series of four hour-long episodes, starring Ian Carmichael as Wimsey.
