= Chairman of Ways and Means =

Senior member of the UK House of Commons

Chairman of Ways and Means and Deputy Speaker of the House of Commons
- Logo used to represent the House of Commons

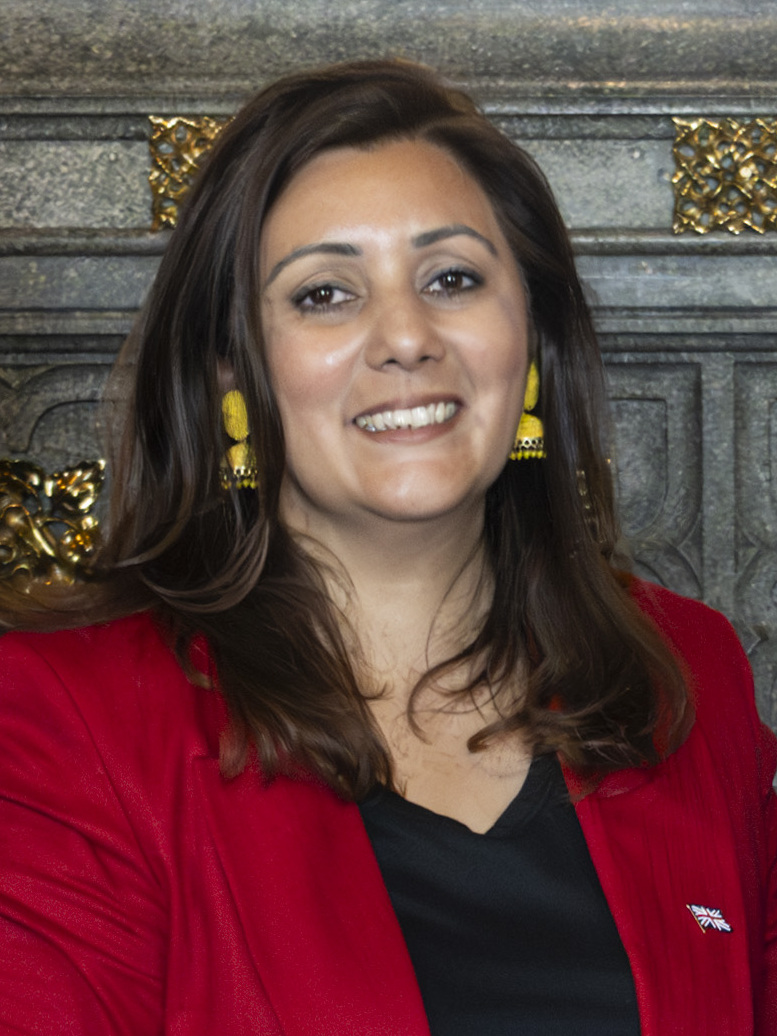
- Incumbent; Nus Ghani since 23 July 2024
- Style: Madam/Mr. Deputy Speaker (whilst presiding)
- Appointer: Elected by the House of Commons
- Inaugural holder: Sir Alexander Grant
- Formation: 1826
- Deputy: Judith Cummins (First Deputy Chairman); Caroline Nokes (Second Deputy Chairman)

In the United Kingdom, the Chairman of Ways and Means is a senior member of the House of Commons who acts as one of the Speaker's three deputies. The current holder is Nusrat Ghani, following her election to the position on 23 July 2024.

== History and functions ==
The Chairman of Ways and Means is the principal Deputy Speaker of the House of Commons, presiding over the House in the Speaker's absence. The chairman also takes the chair of the Committee of the Whole House. The chairman's title is derived from their role in the former Committee of Ways and Means, which was abolished in 1967.

The chairman's connection with the financial responsibilities of this committee gave rise to the tradition that the chairman presides over the annual budget debate, although there is no reason why the Speaker cannot do so if he or she chooses. The chairman is always a senior Member of the House, often with experience of chairing standing committees, and sometimes also of being a government minister.

The deputy chairmen also deputise for the Speaker in the chair or by chairing committees of the Whole House, although the chairman has certain additional and distinct responsibilities (for instance, in relation to private bills and overseeing the Panel of Committee Chairs).

The chairman is also chair of the Court of Referees, established in 1865.

Once elected, both the Chairman of Ways and Means and the deputy chairmen follow the same tradition of neither speaking nor voting on any matter before the House (unless a casting vote is required). Unlike the Speaker, though, they remain members of their political party and campaign in general elections as party politicians.

== Election ==
Before 2010, the chairman was appointed by the Leader of the House or another government minister, with the first and second deputy chairmen being appointed by the House of Commons from 1902 and 1971 respectively, but in November 2009, a report was published by the Procedure Committee which made the chairman, first deputy and second deputy chairmen all elected which was approved in January 2010, with the election process further detailed in a report published by the Procedure Committee in February 2010 and approved the following month.

This election takes place after the election of the Speaker, and uses the Single Transferable Vote voting system, with the first candidate reaching the quota being elected as the chairman, the second candidate reaching the quota being elected as first deputy chairman and the third candidate reaching the quota being elected as second deputy chairman, but there are some rules on who can be elected.

The chairman and second deputy chairman are elected from the opposite side of the House to the (former) party of the Speaker, while the first deputy chairman comes from the same side, which can lead to some situations where only the chairman and second deputy chairman are actually elected and the first deputy chairman is effectively appointed to the role if there was only one candidate in the election from the (former) party of the Speaker. This is because, in this situation, the candidate from the (former) party of the Speaker would automatically be elected to be the first deputy chairman without appearing on the ballot paper.

There is usually a gap between the election of the Speaker and the election of the chairman and deputy chairmen of anywhere from a few weeks to a few months, which has led to the House of Commons nominating members to temporarily serve in these roles until elections could be held. A report from the Procedure Committee published in October 2011 recommended that a new standing order be created to give the Speaker the power to appoint a temporary chairman and temporary deputy chairmen to serve between the start of a Parliament and the election of these positions, but as of the present day, this standing order has not been created, which has led to the House agreeing to appoint temporary chairman and deputy chairmen in various different ways.

For example, after the 2010 general election, the House agreed on 25 May that the Speaker could nominate people to serve as temporary chairman and deputy chairmen, while after the 2015 general election, the process was broadly the same, with the only difference being that the House agreed to the appointment of temporary chairman and deputy chairmen on 26 March, which is before the general election had taken place. After the 2017 and 2019 general elections, the Leader of the House put forward a motion on the day of the Queen's Speech which provided for the appointment of temporary chairman and deputy chairmen. The major difference between these is that, after the 2017 election, the motion put forward then was for the Speaker to nominate temporary chairman and deputy chairmen (like what had happened in 2010 and 2015), but after the 2019 election, the motion put forward was to itself appoint the temporary chairman and deputy chairmen.

The Speaker (or the Leader of the House in 2019) didn't necessarily have to appoint people to fill all the roles. In fact, after every election where the chairmen and deputy chairmen were elected except 2019, the Speaker only appointed two people as Deputy Speakers, not as chairmen and deputy chairmen. Only in 2019 were there people appointed to all three roles and as chairmen and deputy chairmen.

Because the Speaker, chairman and deputy chairmen do not vote (except to break a tie), this effectively pairs the occupants of the chair (their presumed support for their side cancelling each other out), which means no party loses a voting advantage on account of having one of the four drawn from its ranks.

== List of Chairmen of Ways and Means since 1826 ==
Bold type and light grey colour indicate a chairman who was later elected as the Speaker of the House of Commons.

Light green colour indicates a former deputy chairman.

From	Until	Name	Party	Constituency	Retirement honour
1826	1831	Sir Alexander Grant, Bt	Conservative	Aldborough, Westbury	None
1831	1841	Ralph Bernal	Whig	Rochester	None
1841	1847	Thomas Greene	Conservative	Lancaster	None
1847	1852	Ralph Bernal	Whig	Rochester	None
1852	1853	John Wilson-Patten	Conservative	North Lancashire	Baron Winmarleigh (1874)
1853	1855	Hon. Edward Pleydell-Bouverie	Whig	Kilmarnock Burghs	None
1855	1859	Henry FitzRoy	Conservative	Lewes	None
1859	1864	William Nathaniel Massey	Liberal	Salford	None
1865	1872	John George Dodson	Liberal	East Sussex	Baron Monk Bretton (1884)
1872	1874	John Bonham Carter	Liberal	Winchester	None
1874	1880	Henry Cecil Raikes	Conservative	Chester	None
1880	1883	Lyon Playfair	Liberal	Edinburgh and St Andrews Universities	Baron Playfair (1892)
1883	1885	Sir Arthur Otway, Bt	Liberal	Rochester	None
1886	1893	Leonard Courtney	Liberal	Bodmin	Baron Courtney of Penwith (1906)
1893	1895	John William Mellor	Liberal	Sowerby	None
1895	1905	James Lowther	Conservative	Penrith	Viscount Ullswater (1921)
1905	1906	Sir John Lawson, Bt	Conservative	Thirsk and Malton	Baronetcy (1905)
1906	1911	Alfred Emmott	Liberal	Oldham	Baron Emmott (1911)
1911	1921	John Henry Whitley	Liberal	Halifax	None
1921	1924	James Hope	Conservative	Sheffield Central	Baron Rankeillour (1932)
Feb 1924	Oct 1924	Robert Young	Labour	Newton	Knighthood (1931)
1924	1929	James Hope	Conservative	Sheffield Central	Baron Rankeillour (1932)
1929	1931	Robert Young	Labour	Newton	Knighthood (1931)
1931	1943	Dennis Herbert	Conservative	Watford	Baron Hemingford (1943)
Jan 1943	Mar 1943	Douglas Clifton Brown	Conservative	Hexham	Viscount Ruffside (1951)
1943	May 1945	James Milner	Labour	Leeds South East	Baron Milner of Leeds (1951)
May 1945	Aug 1945	Charles Williams	Conservative	Torquay	None
Aug 1945	1951	James Milner	Labour	Leeds South East	Baron Milner of Leeds (1951)
1951	1959	Sir Charles MacAndrew	Unionist	Bute and Northern Ayrshire	Baron MacAndrew (1959)
1959	1962	Gordon Touche	Conservative	Dorking	Baronetcy (1962)
1962	1964	Sir William Anstruther-Gray	Unionist	Berwick and East Lothian	Baron Kilmany (1966) for Life
1964	1965	Horace King	Labour	Southampton Itchen	Baron Maybray-King (1971) for Life
1965	1966	Sir Samuel Storey, Bt	Conservative	Stretford	Baron Buckton (1966) for Life
1966	1968	Sir Eric Fletcher	Labour	Islington East	Baron Fletcher (1970) for Life
1968	1970	Sydney Irving	Labour	Dartford	Baron Irving of Dartford (1979) for Life
1970	1974	Sir Robert Grant-Ferris	Conservative	Nantwich	Baron Harvington (1974) for Life
1974	1976	George Thomas	Labour	Cardiff West	Viscount Tonypandy (1983)
1976	1979	Oscar Murton	Conservative	Poole	Baron Murton of Lindisfarne (1979) for Life
1979	1983	Bernard Weatherill	Conservative	Croydon North East	Baron Weatherill (1992) for Life
1983	1992	Harold Walker	Labour	Doncaster Central	Baron Walker of Doncaster (1997) for Life
1992	1997	Michael Morris	Conservative	Northampton South	Baron Naseby (1997) for Life
1997	2010	Sir Alan Haselhurst	Conservative	Saffron Walden	Baron Haselhurst (2018) for Life
2010	2019	Sir Lindsay Hoyle	Labour	Chorley	Elected as Speaker
2020	2024	Dame Eleanor Laing	Conservative	Epping Forest	Baroness Laing of Elderslie (2024) for Life
2024	Incumbent	Nus Ghani	Conservative	Sussex Weald	Incumbent

== List of Deputy Chairmen of Ways and Means (1902–1971) ==
Bold type and light grey colour indicate a deputy chairman who was later elected as the Speaker of the House of Commons.

Light blue colour indicates a deputy chairman who was promoted to chairman.

From	Until	Name	Party	Constituency	Retirement honour
1902	1905	Arthur Frederick Jeffreys	Conservative	Basingstoke	None
1905	1906	Laurence Hardy	Conservative	Ashford	None
1906	1910	James Caldwell	Liberal	Mid Lanarkshire	None
1910	1911	John Henry Whitley	Liberal	Halifax	None
1911	1918	Sir Donald Maclean	Liberal	Peebles and Selkirk	Knighthood (1917)
1919	1923	Sir Edwin Cornwall, Bt	Liberal	Bethnal Green North-East	Baronetcy (1918)
Feb 1924	Oct 1924	Cyril Entwistle	Liberal	Kingston upon Hull South West	None
Dec 1924	1928	Edward FitzRoy	Conservative	Daventry	None
1928	1929	Dennis Herbert	Conservative	Watford	Baron Hemingford (1943)
1929	1931	Herbert Dunnico	Labour	Consett	Knighthood (1938)
1931	1938	Robert Bourne	Conservative	Oxford	None
1938	1943	Douglas Clifton Brown	Conservative	Hexham	Viscount Ruffside (1951)
Jan 1943	Mar 1943	James Milner	Labour	Leeds South East	Baron Milner of Leeds (1951)
1943	May 1945	Charles Williams	Conservative	Torquay	None
May 1945	Aug 1945	Sir Charles MacAndrew	Unionist	Bute and Northern Ayrshire	Baron MacAndrew (1959)
Aug 1945	1948	Hubert Beaumont	Labour	Batley and Morley	None
1948	1950	Frank Bowles	Labour	Nuneaton	Baron Bowles (1964) for Life
1950	1951	Sir Charles MacAndrew	Unionist	Bute and Northern Ayrshire	Baron MacAndrew (1959)
1951	1956	Rhys Hopkin Morris	Liberal	Carmarthen	Knighthood (1956)
1956	1959	Gordon Touche	Conservative	Dorking	Baronetcy (1962)
1959	1962	Sir William Anstruther-Gray	Unionist	Berwick and East Lothian	Baron Kilmany (1966) for Life
1962	1964	Sir Robert Grimston, Bt	Conservative	Westbury	Baron Grimston of Westbury (1964)
1964	1965	Sir Samuel Storey, Bt	Conservative	Stretford	Baron Buckton (1966) for Life
1965	1966	Roderic Bowen	Liberal	Ceredigion	None
1966	1968	Sydney Irving	Labour	Dartford	Baron Irving of Dartford (1979) for Life
1968	1970	Harry Gourlay	Labour	Kirkcaldy	None

== List of First Deputy Chairmen of Ways and Means (since 1971) ==
Bold type and light grey colour indicate a first deputy chairman who was later elected as the Speaker of the House of Commons.

Light blue colour indicates where a first deputy chairman was promoted to chairman.

Light green colour indicates where a second deputy chairman was promoted to first deputy chairman.

From	Until	Name	Party	Constituency	Retirement honour
1970	1973	Betty Harvie Anderson	Conservative	East Renfrewshire	Baroness Skrimshire of Quarter (1979) for Life
1973	1974	Lance Mallalieu	Labour	Brigg	Knighthood (1979)
1974	1976	Oscar Murton	Conservative	Poole	Baron Murton of Lindisfarne (1979) for Life
1976	1979	Sir Myer Galpern	Labour	Glasgow Shettleston	Baron Galpern (1979) for Life
1979	1982	Sir Bryant Godman Irvine	Conservative	Rye	Knighthood (1986)
1982	1987	Ernest Armstrong	Labour	North West Durham	None
1987	1992	Sir Paul Dean	Conservative	Woodspring	Baron Dean of Harptree (1993) for Life
1992	1997	Geoffrey Lofthouse	Labour	Pontefract and Castleford	Baron Lofthouse of Pontefract (1997) for Life
1997	2000	Michael Martin	Labour	Glasgow Springburn	Baron Martin of Springburn (2009) for Life
2000	2010	Sylvia Heal	Labour	Halesowen and Rowley Regis	Dame Commander of the Order of the British Empire (2022))
2010	2013	Nigel Evans	Conservative	Ribble Valley	None
2013	2019	Dame Eleanor Laing	Conservative	Epping Forest	Baroness Laing of Elderslie (2024) for Life
2020	2024	Dame Rosie Winterton	Labour	Doncaster Central	Baroness Winterton of Doncaster (2024) for Life
2024	Incumbent	Judith Cummins	Labour	Bradford South	Incumbent

== List of Second Deputy Chairmen of Ways and Means since 1971 ==
Bold type and light grey colour indicate a second deputy chairman who was later elected as the Speaker of the House of Commons.

Light blue colour indicates where a second deputy chairman was promoted to chairman.

From	Until	Name	Party	Constituency	Retirement honour
1971	1973	Lance Mallalieu	Labour	Brigg	None
1973	1974	Oscar Murton	Conservative	Poole	Baron Murton of Lindisfarne (1979) for Life
1974	1976	Sir Myer Galpern	Labour	Glasgow Shettleston	Baron Galpern (1979) for Life
1976	1979	Sir Bryant Godman Irvine	Conservative	Rye	None
1979	1981	Dick Crawshaw	Labour	Liverpool Toxteth	Baron Crawshaw of Aintree (1985) for Life
1981	1982	Ernest Armstrong	Labour	North West Durham	None
1982	1987	Sir Paul Dean	Conservative	Woodspring	Baron Dean of Harptree (1993) for Life
1987	1992	Betty Boothroyd	Labour	West Bromwich West	Baroness Boothroyd (2001) for Life
1992	1997	Dame Janet Fookes	Conservative	Plymouth Drake	Baroness Fookes (1997) for Life
1997	2010	Sir Michael Lord	Conservative	Central Suffolk and North Ipswich	Baron Framlingham (2011) for Life
2010	2015	Dame Dawn Primarolo	Labour	Bristol South	Baroness Primarolo (2015) for Life
2015	2017	Natascha Engel	Labour	North East Derbyshire	None
2017	2019	Dame Rosie Winterton	Labour	Doncaster Central	Baroness Winterton of Doncaster (2024) for Life
2020	2024	Nigel Evans	Conservative	Ribble Valley	None
2024	Incumbent	Caroline Nokes	Conservative	Romsey and Southampton North	Incumbent

== See also ==
- Committee of Ways and Means
- Speaker of the House of Commons
