= Baron Grantchester =

Title in the Peerage of the United Kingdom

Baron Grantchester, of Knightsbridge in the City of Westminster, is a title in the Peerage of the United Kingdom. It was created on 30 June 1953 for the banker and Liberal politician Alfred Suenson-Taylor. As of 2019, the title is held by his grandson, the third Baron, who succeeded his father in 1995. In 2003, he replaced the deceased Lord Milner of Leeds as one of the ninety elected hereditary peers that are allowed to remain in the House of Lords after the passing of the House of Lords Act 1999. Lord Grantchester sits on the Labour benches.

The family seat is Lower House Farm, near Audlem, Cheshire.

== Barons Grantchester (1953) ==
- Alfred Jesse Suenson-Taylor, 1st Baron Grantchester (1893–1976)
- Kenneth Bent Suenson-Taylor, 2nd Baron Grantchester (1921–1995)
- Christopher John Suenson-Taylor, 3rd Baron Grantchester (born 1951)

The heir apparent is the present holder's son, the Hon. Jesse David Suenson-Taylor (born 1977)

=== Line of succession ===
- Alfred Jesse Taylor, 1st Baron Grantchester (1893—1976)
  - Kenneth Bent Suenson-Taylor, 2nd Baron Grantchester (1921—1995)
    - Christopher John Suenson-Taylor, 3rd Baron Grantchester (born 1951)
      - (1) Hon. Jesse David Jaffe Suenson-Taylor (born 1977)
      - (2) Hon. Adam Joel Suenson-Taylor (born 1987)
    - (3) Hon. Jeremy Kenneth Suenson-Taylor (born 1951)
      - (4) Rowan Suenson-Taylor (born 1974)
      - (5) Laurel Suenson-Taylor (born 1979)
      - (6) Daniel Suenson-Taylor (born 1983)
    - (7) Hon. James Gunnar Suenson-Taylor (born 1955)
      - (8) Andrew James Suenson-Taylor (born 1985)
      - (9) Jonathan Gunnar Suenson-Taylor (born 1991)

== Arms ==
Coat of arms of Baron Grantchester
Crest 1st Issuant from a crown palisada Or a unicorn's head Sable armed and charged on the neck with an annulet Gold and holding in the mouth an acorn leaved and slipped Proper; 2nd issuant from a coronet composed of light roses Gules seeded Argent and set upon a rim Or a swan rousant Proper crowned with an antique crown Gold. Escutcheon Quarterly 1st & 4th: Sable on a fess engrailed between in chief a fleur-de-lys between two annulets Or and in base as many like annulets a lion passant of the field; 2nd & 3rd Gules: in chief two swans rousant Proper each crowned with an antique crown Or and in base barry wavy of six Argent and Azure. Supporters Dexter, an unicorn sable armed, and crined or, gorged with a collar argent, thereon a fesse wavy azure; Sinister, a lion or, gorged with a collar of four hearts gules. Motto Peace And Holy Quiet Badge A pellet edged Or charged with an owl standing towards the sinister Gold.
