= Dennis Herbert, 2nd Baron Hemingford =

British peer

Dennis George Ruddock Herbert, 2nd Baron Hemingford, JP (25 March 1904 − 19 June 1982) was the second and last Lord Lieutenant of Huntingdon and Peterborough between 1968 and 1974.

Herbert was born on 25 March 1904 in Kensington, London, to Dennis Herbert and Mary Graeme Bell, daughter of Valentine Graeme Bell, as their first son. He had three younger brothers.

Herbert was educated at Oundle School and graduated from Brasenose College with a Master of Arts. He was a master between 1926 and 1939 and the Rector between 1948 and 1951 at Achimota College, and the headmaster between 1939 and 1947 at King's College Budo.

His father was created Baron Hemingford in 1943 and Herbert inherited the title four years later. Lord Hemingford was chairman of the Africa Bureau between 1952 and 1963, and held the offices of Justice of the Peace for Huntingdonshire in 1960, Member of the Huntingdonshire County Council between 1961 and 1965, and Lord Lieutenant of Huntingdon and Peterborough between 1968 and 1974.

Herbert married Elizabeth McClare Clark on 25 June 1932, and they had three children: Nicholas, Celia (born 25 July 1939; The Lord Goodhart's widow), and Catherine (born September 1942; Hal Moggridge's wife). Lady Hemingford died in 1979, and Lord Hemingford in 1982.

Honorary titles
Preceded by The Lord de Ramsey	Lord Lieutenant of Huntingdon and Peterborough; 30 July 1968 − 31 March 1974	Office abolished
Peerage of the United Kingdom
Preceded by Dennis Herbert	Baron Hemingford; 1947–1982	Succeeded by Nicholas Herbert
