= Nicholas Herbert, 3rd Baron Hemingford =

British peer and journalist (1934–2022)

The Right Honourable The Lord Hemingford FRSA

Member of the House of Lords
- Lord Temporal
- as a hereditary peer 24 November 1982 – 11 November 1999
- Preceded by: The 2nd Baron Hemingford
- Succeeded by: Seat abolished (Note: Pursuant to the House of Lords Act 1999.)

Personal details
- Born: Dennis Nicholas Herbert Herbert; 25 July 1934 Watford, Hertfordshire, England
- Died: 17 December 2022 (aged 88)
- Spouse(s): Jennifer Bailey (m. 1958; died 2018) Jill Paton Walsh (m. 2020; died 2020)
- Children: 4
- Parent: Dennis Herbert, 2nd Baron Hemingford (father)
- Relatives: Valentine Graeme Bell (great-grandfather); Dennis Herbert, 1st Baron Hemingford (grandfather); William Goodhart, Baron Goodhart (brother-in-law); Hal Moggridge (brother-in-law)
- Education: Clare College, Cambridge University (M.A.)

Dennis Nicholas Herbert Herbert, 3rd Baron Hemingford (25 July 1934 – 17 December 2022), known professionally as Nick Herbert, was a British peer and journalist who collaborated with publications such as The Times and the Cambridge Evening News.

Lord Hemingford was entitled to a seat in the House of Lords between 1982 and 1999, and spoke 29 times during this period. His maiden speech was in February 1983 and his last speech in July 1992, during the discussion of the Press Complaints Commission.

== Early life and career ==
Nicholas Herbert was born on 25 July 1934 to Dennis Herbert (1904–1982) and Elizabeth McClare Clark (died 1979) as their first child. He has two younger sisters, Celia (born 25 July 1939; widow of The Lord Goodhart) and Catherine (born 1942; spouse of Hal Moggridge). His paternal grandfather was the Member of Parliament Sir Dennis Herbert, who was created Baron Hemingford in 1943.

Herbert was educated at Oundle School. He graduated from Clare College, Cambridge, in 1957 with a Bachelor of Arts and in 1960 with a Master of Arts.

Herbert was Assistant Washington correspondent for The Times between 1961 and 1965, Middle East correspondent between 1966 and 1968, deputy features editor between 1968 and 1970, editor of the Cambridge Evening News between 1970 and 1974, and editor director of Westminster Press between 1974 and 1992. Herbert also was deputy chief executive of Westminster Press between 1992 and 1995.

== Personal life and death ==
Herbert married Jennifer Mary Toresen Bailey (30 March 1933 – 8 January 2018) on 8 November 1958. The Lady Hemingford held the office of Deputy Lieutenant of Cambridgeshire in 1996 and was appointed OBE in 1997 for services to the community in Hemingford Abbots and to the British Red Cross Society. She died after a long illness on 8 January 2018. They had 4 children:

- Hon. Elizabeth Frances Toresen Herbert (born 21 February 1963)
- Hon. Caroline Mary Louis Herbert (born 4 October 1964)
- Hon. Alice Christine Emma Herbert (born 1968)
- Christopher Dennis Charles Herbert, 4th Baron Hemingford (born 4 July 1973)

In February 2020, Herbert met the writer Jill Paton Walsh, whom he married in September of that year. She died three weeks later of kidney and heart failure.

Herbert died on 17 December 2022, at the age of 88. His funeral took place on 3 February in St Margaret's Church, Hemingford Abbotson.

== Honours ==
The Lord Hemingford was elected a Fellow of the Royal Society of Arts in 1989.

== Selected bibliography ==
Some of Herbert's most widely held works are:

- Jews and Arabs in conflict (1970)
- [Hon. Nicholas Herbert correspondence] (2008)
- Successive journeys: a family in four continents (2008)
- Road travel and transport in Georgian Gloucestershire: illustrated by extracts from the Gloucester Journal newspaper, 1722-1830 (2009)

== Notes ==
Peerage of the United Kingdom
Preceded by Dennis Herbert	Baron Hemingford; 1982–2022; Member of the House of Lords (1982–1999)	Succeeded by Christopher Herbert
