= Local and personal acts of Parliament (United Kingdom) =

Act passed via the private bill procedure

Local and personal acts are laws in the United Kingdom which apply to a particular individual or group of individuals, or corporate entity. This contrasts with a public general act of Parliament (statute) which applies to the nation-state. Acts of Parliament can afford relief from another law; grant a unique benefit or, grant powers not available under the general law; or, relieve someone from legal responsibility for some allegedly wrongful act.

Acts for the benefit of individuals were before 1948 known as private acts, and are now called personal acts.

Acts of local or limited application are known as local acts or public local acts. This distinction from the more normal public general acts was introduced in 1797; before that time there were simply 'public acts'.

The bills for both personal and local acts are known as private bills. These should not be confused with private member's bills—which, in the Westminster system, are bills for a public general act of Parliament proposed by individual parliamentarians rather than the government.

About 11,000 private or personal acts have been passed since 1539, and 26,500 local acts have become law since 1797 (when local acts were separated from public general acts).

== Personal acts ==
Personal acts (known as private acts until 1948) evolved from the right to petition Parliament for redress from a specific wrong, or to obtain a benefit that was not otherwise available through statute or the common law. The granting of divorces, the naturalisation of (granting of citizenship to) foreigners, legal name changes, and changing the terms of a will, were often given effect through this means. In more recent years (since the introduction of general divorce and nationality laws, and the widespread adoption of the practice of using a deed poll to change name) the use of personal acts has greatly decreased. From 1980 they were only used to authorise six marriages between individuals who would not otherwise be able to marry due to being within the prohibited degrees of relationship, and no personal acts have been passed since 1987. The most recent personal act, passed in 1987, provided for 59-year-old George Evans to marry his 28-year-old former daughter-in-law Deborah Evans.

Private acts were also used for acts affecting estates. These included inclosure acts, particularly prior to 1801 (after which public acts were passed to reduce the need for private acts), and acts enabling landowners to sell parts of their estate prior to the Settled Land Act 1882.

Until 1815, private and personal acts were not officially printed (although it was common for a private bill to include a clause to deem the act to be a public act and this would lead to it being printed). Divorce acts enacted between 1815 and 1922 were not printed whilst some other personal acts were.

== Local acts ==
Local acts are public acts sought by and for the benefit of organisations or used to authorise major projects such as railways or canals or to grant extra powers.

The latter are often sought by local authorities who may seek additional powers to enable them to manage or control issues occurring in their locality. One such example is the Ministry of Housing and Local Government Provisional Order Confirmation (Greater London Parks and Open Spaces) Act 1967.

=== Corporations and major projects ===
In the nineteenth century, local acts were used to create corporations, grant monopolies and, most frequently, for the construction of railways, canals and other infrastructure projects.

Their use has become more limited in the twentieth and twenty-first centuries as statute law (principally the Transport and Works Act 1992) and statutory instruments have enabled many situations to be dealt with through other, delegated, legislative mechanisms. Major public transport projects which do require the passing of a specific Act of Parliament now tend to be dealt with as hybrid bills which become public general Acts of Parliament.

However, local acts are still used for some purposes, particularly for modifying arrangements made in the past by private act when the practice was more common. One such example is in the restructuring of corporations originally incorporated by private act, where major changes require a new act. Recent examples include the HSBC Investment Banking Act 2002, which facilitated the transfer of one HSBC subsidiary's businesses to two other subsidiaries, and the HBOS Group Reorganisation Act 2006, which facilitated conversion of the Bank of Scotland (originally organised by a 1695 private act of the Parliament of Scotland) into a public limited company.

Similarly, major changes to the organisation of universities or charities may be facilitated through local acts, particularly when this involves the transfer of assets. For example, the University of Manchester Act 2004 effected the merger of two Manchester-based universities by dissolving two existing universities (both incorporated by royal charter) and transferring their rights, properties, assets and obligations to a single new institution (also incorporated by royal charter). For a few universities that are statutory corporations, some revisions to their constitutional documents are also effected by local acts, e.g. the University of London Act 2018.

=== Local authorities ===
The majority of local acts now passed are promoted by local authorities. Such acts are often for the purpose of giving the local authority additional powers to deal with such matters as street trading, or sui generis powers to deal with unique local issues, such as the Isle of Wight Festival.

== Parliamentary process ==
Bills for local and personal acts do not follow exactly the same parliamentary process as bills for public general acts.

Private bills are introduced into Parliament by the person promoting them by means of a petition. Because they may grant powers in excess of the normal law, a person, organisation or local community which could be affected by the proposed law can object to it, either through presenting a petition of their own or securing the support of a Member of Parliament to block the bill.

The Court of Referees exists to consider the rights of a petitioner to argue against a private bill, in cases where the promoters of the bill have challenged that right.

When the bill is sent to a committee of each House, the committee hears arguments for and against the bill in a way quite similar to a civil court hearing: the promoter (often represented by a barrister) has to prove their case and satisfy the committee that the bill is necessary, whilst any opposers will seek to demonstrate that it is not. If the committee agrees that the purposes of the bill are proper and desirable then the bill continues on to the next stage, and ultimately to the other House where a similar process is followed.

Local and personal acts of Parliament have two distinctive features. Firstly, they are preceded by a preamble setting out the reasons why the act needs to be made (and the preamble must be proved for the act to be made). Secondly, they are published in separate series from public acts: whilst public acts are numbered 1, 2, 3, etc. in the year they are passed, local acts are numbered using roman numerals (i, ii, iii etc.) and personal acts are numbered using italic numerals (1, 2, 3, etc.).

The procedure set out in the Parliament Acts 1911 and 1949, which the House of Commons can use to enact laws without the consent of the House of Lords, only applies to public acts; as such, the Lords maintain an absolute veto power over private acts.

== Scotland ==
Private Legislation Procedure (Scotland) Act 1899 (Note: Section 19.)
- Act of Parliament
- Parliament of the United Kingdom
- Long title: An Act to provide for improving and extending the Procedure for obtaining Parliamentary Powers by way of Provisional Orders in matters relating to Scotland.
- Citation: 62 & 63 Vict. c. 47
- Territorial extent: Scotland

Dates
- Royal assent: 9 August 1899
- Commencement: 8 August 1900
- Repealed: 31 July 1936
Other legislation
Amended by	Private Legislation Procedure (Scotland) Act 1933
Repealed by	Private Legislation Procedure (Scotland) Act 1936
Relates to	Parliamentary Costs Act 1865

Status: Repealed

Text of statute as originally enacted

Private Legislation Procedure (Scotland) Act 1933 (Note: Section 7.)
- Act of Parliament
- Parliament of the United Kingdom
- Long title: An Act to improve and extend the procedure under the Private Legislation Procedure (Scotland) Act, 1899.
- Citation: 23 & 24 Geo. 5. c. 37
- Territorial extent: Scotland

Dates
- Royal assent: 28 July 1933
- Commencement: 28 July 1933 (Note: The Acts of Parliament (Commencement) Act 1793.)
- Repealed: 31 July 1936
Other legislation
Amends	Private Legislation Procedure (Scotland) Act 1899
Repealed by	Private Legislation Procedure (Scotland) Act 1936

Status: Repealed

Text of statute as originally enacted

Private legislation that mainly relates to Scotland is dealt with under a different procedure: that put in place by the Private Legislation Procedure (Scotland) Act 1936 (26 Geo. 5 & 1 Edw. 8. c. 52).

The 1936 act, which replaced similar previous acts, the Private Legislation Procedure (Scotland) Act 1899 (62 & 63 Vict. c. 47) and the Private Legislation Procedure (Scotland) Act 1933 (23 & 24 Geo. 5. c. 37), provides for petitions for private legislation which are opposed to be considered by an inquiry panel made up of two members of the House of Commons and two members of the House of Lords. The inquiry sits in Scotland, rather than at Westminster, and hears arguments for and against the proposal, before making a recommendation to the Secretary of State for Scotland. If the proposal is not opposed then an inquiry is not held, but the petition is still scrutinised by counsel to the Secretary of State.

If the inquiry's, or counsel's, recommendation is positive then the Secretary of State makes a provisional order. This order has no effect, however, until confirmed by an order confirmation act passed by Parliament. The bill for such an act normally skips the second reading and committee stages of the parliamentary process (as this has been replaced by the inquiry) and so takes up less time.

Since devolution, many matters which were previously dealt with by provisional orders now fall within the responsibility of the Scottish Parliament. The Scottish Parliament has its own private legislation procedures which provide for the consideration of the bill and any objections by a specially convened private bill committee of the parliament.

In contrast to personal and local acts passed by the Westminster Parliament, private bills in the Scottish Parliament do not begin with a preamble and, when they have been passed, become part of the same series (system of numbering) as, and so are indistinguishable from, public acts of the Scottish Parliament.

== See also ==
- Public and private bills
