= Nicholas Herbert =

Nicholas Herbert may refer to:

- Nicholas Herbert (politician, died 1775) (c. 1706–1775), British politician, member of parliament for Newport, and for Wilton
- Nicholas Herbert, 3rd Baron Hemingford, British peer and journalist
- Nick Herbert (born 1963), English politician, member of parliament for Arundel and South Downs
- Nick Herbert (physicist) (born 1936), American physicist
- Nicholas Lea (Nicholas Christopher Herbert, born 1962), Canadian actor.
