= Hal Moggridge =

British architect

Harry Traherne Moggridge CBE (born 1936) is a British architect and landscape architect, co-founder of Colvin & Moggridge with Brenda Colvin, and former Professor of Landscape Architecture at Sheffield University; a past president of the Landscape Institute and a commissioner of the Royal Fine Art Commission.

== Career ==
Moggridge trained as an architect, but over time, became primarily a landscape architect. In 1965 Moggridge first met Brenda Colvin, and in 1969, she took him on as a business partner, and her practice became Colvin & Moggridge.

Moggridge designed Youlbury House, built from 1969 to 1971 as a weekend home for the barrister William Goodhart (now Lord Goodhart) and his wife Celia Goodhart, who was Moggridge's sister-in-law. It has been Grade II listed since 2009.

Moggridge received a CBE for services to landscape architecture.

== Personal life ==
In 1962, he married Hon. Catherine Grevile Herbert (born September 1942), the younger daughter of Dennis Herbert, 2nd Baron Hemingford and the younger sister of The 3rd Baron Hemingford. They have a daughter and two sons.
