= Baron Milner =

Baron Milner may refer to:

- Baron Milner of Leeds, a barony in the peerage of the United Kingdom
- A subsidiary title of Alfred Milner, 1st Viscount Milner (1854–1925)

== See also ==
- Milner baronets, a title in the Baronetage of Great Britain
