= Richard Milner, 3rd Baron Milner of Leeds =

British hereditary peer (born 1959)

Richard James Milner, 3rd Baron Milner of Leeds (born 16 May 1959), is a British hereditary peer.

== Biography ==
Milner is the only son of Michael Milner, 2nd Baron Milner of Leeds, he was educated at Charterhouse School and the University of Surrey (BSc). He succeeded to the peerage upon the death of his father in 2003.

== Marriage and children ==
Milner married Margaret Christine Voisin on 25 June 1988. They have two daughters:

- Hon. Charlotte Emma Milner (born 8 May 1990)
- Hon. Nicola Louise Christine Milner (born 3 February 1992)

Lord Milner has no sons and there are no other heirs to the barony.

== Arms ==
Coat of arms of Richard Milner, 3rd Baron Milner of Leeds

Crest
Perched on a sword with point to the dexter Proper and hilt and pommel Or an owl also Proper gorged with a collar Sable thereon three mullets Argent pendent therefrom a pair of scales and resting on the dexter claw a portcullis chained Or.
Escutcheon
Gules on a chevron Ermine between in chief two bits Or and in base a rose Argent barbed and seeded Proper a teazel Sable.
Supporters
On either side an owl Proper gorged with a collar Sable thereon three mullets Argent pendent therefrom a portcullis chained Or.
Motto
Do Right And Fear Nothing

Peerage of the United Kingdom
Preceded by Michael Milner	Baron Milner of Leeds; 2003–present	Incumbent
