= Baron Hemingford =

Barony in the Peerage of the United Kingdom

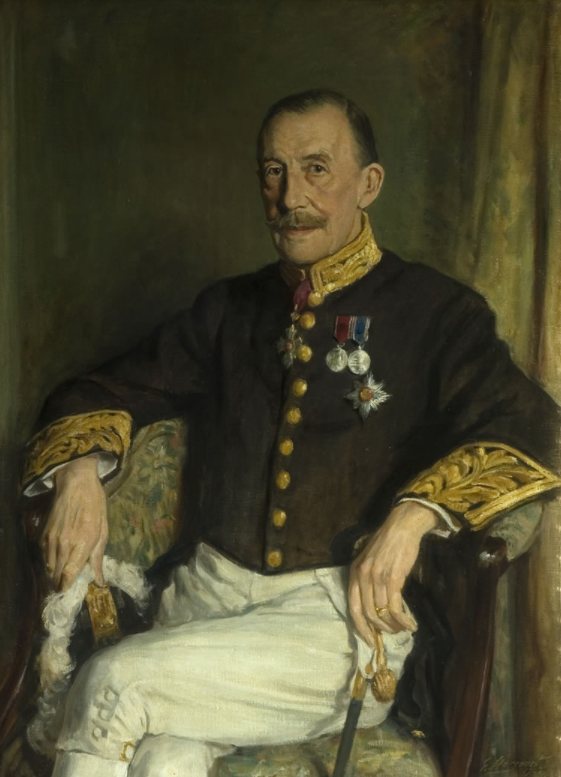
A 1944 portrait of the 1st Baron Hemingford by George Harcourt

Baron Hemingford, of Watford in the County of Hertford, is a title in the Peerage of the United Kingdom. It was created 1 February 1943 for the Conservative politician Sir Dennis Herbert. He was a Deputy Speaker of the House of Commons from 1931 to 1943. His son, the second Baron, notably served as Lord Lieutenant of Huntingdon and Peterborough from 1968 to 1974. The title is currently held by Christopher Herbert, who succeeded in 2022.

== Barons Hemingford (1943) ==
- Dennis Henry Herbert, 1st Baron Hemingford (1869–1947)
- Dennis George Ruddock Herbert, 2nd Baron Hemingford (1904–1982)
- (Dennis) Nicholas Herbert Herbert, 3rd Baron Hemingford (1934–2022)
- Christopher Dennis Charles Herbert, 4th Baron Hemingford (b. 1973)

The heir apparent is the present holder's son, Hon. Frederick Russell Dennis Herbert (b. 2011).

=== Line of succession ===
- Dennis Henry Herbert, 1st Baron Hemingford (1869–1947)
  - Dennis George Ruddock Herbert, 2nd Baron Hemingford (1904–1982)
    - Dennis Nicholas Herbert Herbert, 3rd Baron Hemingford (1934–2022)
      - Christopher Dennis Charles Herbert, 4th Baron Hemingford (b. 1973)
        - (1) Hon. Frederick Russell Dennis Herbert (b. 2011)
  - Hon. Valentine Henry Okes Herbert (1905–1983)
    - (2) Timothy William Okes Herbert (b. 1936)
