= John Suenson-Taylor, 3rd Baron Grantchester =

British peer and Labour politician

The Right Honourable The Lord Grantchester
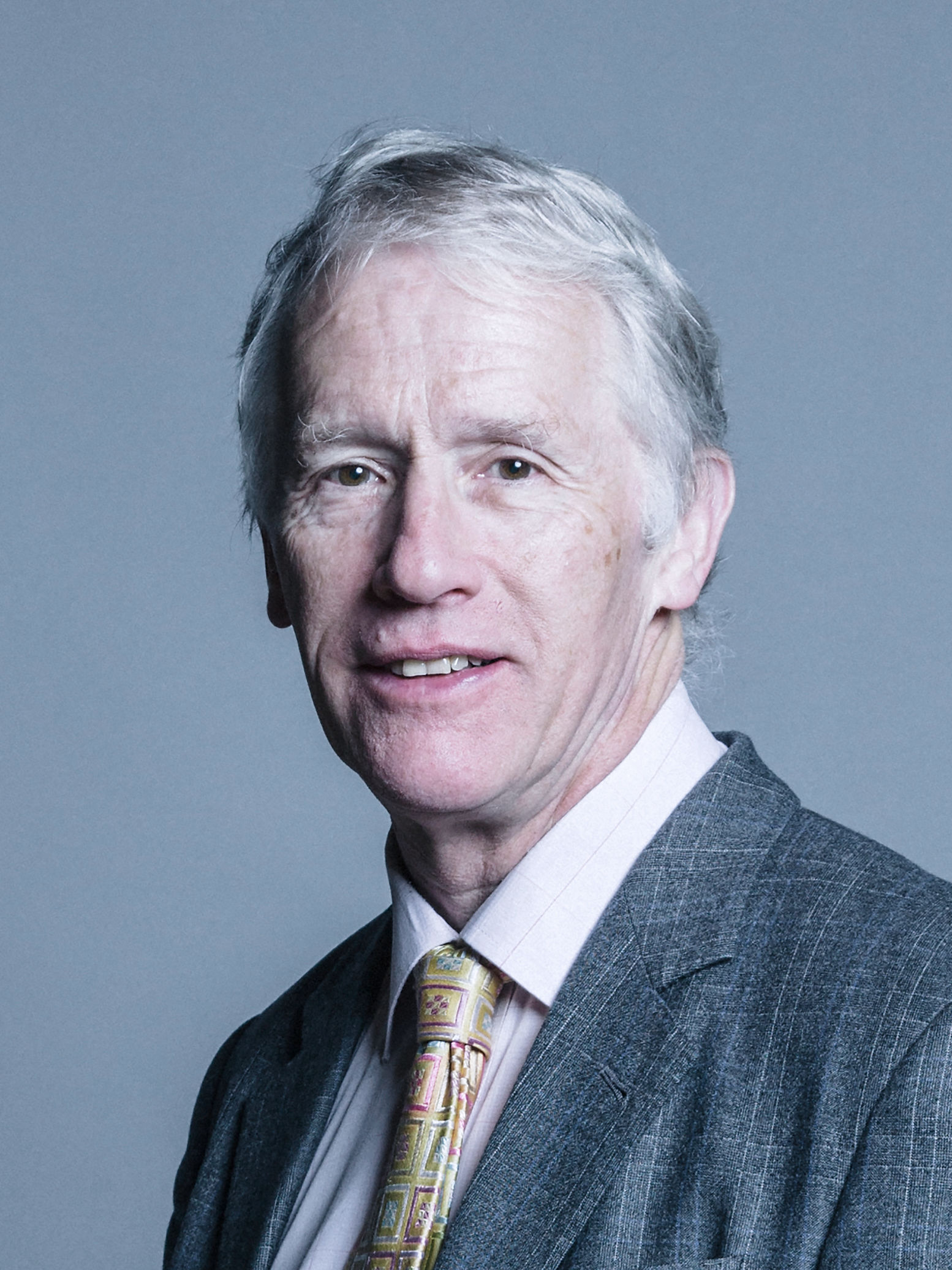

Member of the House of Lords
- Lord Temporal
- Life peerage 15 June 2026
- Elected Hereditary Peer; 31 October 2003 – 29 April 2026
- By-election: 2003
- Preceded by: The 2nd Baron Milner of Leeds
- Succeeded by: Seat abolished
- Hereditary peerage 27 November 1995 – 11 November 1999
- Preceded by: The 2nd Baron Grantchester
- Succeeded by: Seat abolished

Personal details
- Born: 8 April 1951 (age 75)
- Party: Labour
- Occupation: Dairy farmer, politician
- Known for: Former Everton F.C. director

Christopher John Suenson-Taylor, 3rd Baron Grantchester, Baron Grantchester of Audlem (known as John Grantchester; born 8 April 1951), is a British peer and Labour politician.

In May 2026, it was announced that he was to be given one of 26 new life peerages, returning him to the House of Lords after the coming into force of the House of Lords (Hereditary Peers) Act 2026.

== Early life ==
He is the son of the 2nd Baron Grantchester and Lady Grantchester (née Betty Moores) and was educated at Winchester College, where he was in the school football team, and at the London School of Economics, where he graduated Bachelor of Science in economics.

== Business and charitable interests ==
=== Littlewoods ===
Grantchester is a grandson of John Moores, and his mother was nominally head of the Moores family, founders of the Liverpool-based Littlewoods football pools and retailing businesses, until her death in 2019. Grantchester is a former director of Littlewoods and was ranked 149th in the Sunday Times Rich List of 2022 with an estimated net worth of £1.2 billion.

=== Football ===
He was a director of his favoured football team, Everton. He has frequently been listed in the FourFourTwo rich list as a result of his shareholding. As of December 2015, he owned 8.5% of the club. He left the Everton board in December 2000. He is a trustee of the Foundation for Sport and the Arts. He is also a trustee of the Everton Collection, which incorporates the David France Collection, the world's largest open-access club-specific football memorabilia collection, held in the Liverpool Record Office in Liverpool Central Library.

=== Dairy farming ===
Lord Grantchester runs a dairy farm near Crewe, Cheshire. He is chairman of the South West Cheshire Dairy Association, and a Council Member of both the Cheshire Agricultural Society and the Royal Agricultural Society.

Lord Grantchester was the chairman of one of the UK's largest milk and cheese businesses, Dairy Farmers of Britain, accounting for 10% of the UK milk market, when it entered receivership in June 2009.

== House of Lords ==
In 1995, he succeeded to his father's title. He replaced the deceased Lord Milner of Leeds as one of the 92 hereditary peers remaining in the House of Lords under the House of Lords Act 1999 after defeating Viscount Hanworth by two votes to one in a by-election for the Labour seat in October 2003. He is a member of Labour Friends of Israel.

Under the leadership of Ed Miliband, he was an Opposition Whip from 8 October 2010 to 18 September 2015.

== Arms ==
Coat of arms of John Suenson-Taylor, 3rd Baron Grantchester
Crest 1st Issuant from a crown palisada Or a unicorn's head Sable armed and charged on the neck with an annulet Gold and holding in the mouth an acorn leaved and slipped Proper; 2nd issuant from a coronet composed of light roses Gules seeded Argent and set upon a rim Or a swan rousant Proper crowned with an antique crown Gold. Escutcheon Quarterly 1st & 4th: Sable on a fess engrailed between in chief a fleur-de-lys between two annulets Or and in base as many like annulets a lion passant of the field; 2nd & 3rd Gules: in chief two swans rousant Proper each crowned with an antique crown Or and in base barry wavy of six Argent and Azure. Supporters Dexter, an unicorn sable armed, and crined or, gorged with a collar argent, thereon a fesse wavy azure; Sinister, a lion or, gorged with a collar of four hearts gules. Motto Peace And Holy Quiet Badge A pellet edged Or charged with an owl standing towards the sinister Gold.

== See also ==
- List of excepted hereditary peers

== Notes ==
Peerage of the United Kingdom
Preceded by Kenneth Suenson-Taylor	Baron Grantchester; 1995–present Member of the House of Lords (1995–1999)	Incumbent; Heir apparent: Hon. Jesse Suenson-Taylor
Parliament of the United Kingdom
Preceded by The Lord Milner of Leeds	Elected hereditary peer to the House of Lords under the House of Lords Act 1999; 2003–2026	Position abolished under the House of Lords (Hereditary Peers) Act 2026
