= John Freeman (British politician) =

British politician and army officer (1915–2014)

Major The Right Honourable John Freeman MBE PC
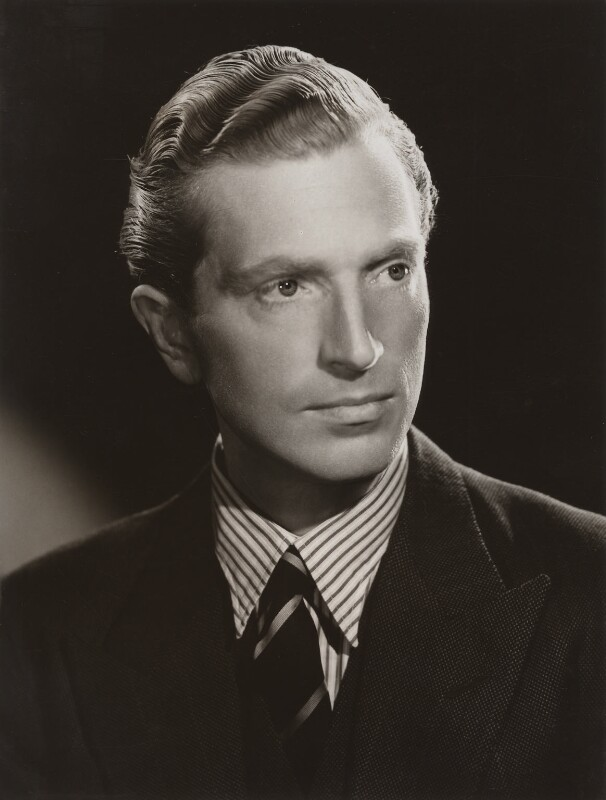

British Ambassador to the United States
- In office 1969–1971
- Monarch: Elizabeth II
- Prime Minister: Harold Wilson; Edward Heath
- Preceded by: Sir Patrick Dean
- Succeeded by: Rowland Baring

High Commissioner of the United Kingdom to India
- In office 1965–1968
- Preceded by: Sir Paul Gore-Booth
- Succeeded by: Sir Morrice James

Member of Parliament for Watford
- In office 5 July 1945 – 6 May 1955
- Preceded by: William Helmore
- Succeeded by: Frederick Farey-Jones

Personal details
- Born: 19 February 1915 London, England
- Died: 20 December 2014 (aged 99)
- Party: Labour
- Spouses: Elizabeth Allen Johnston (m. 1938; div. 1948) Margaret Ista Mabel Kerr (m. 1948; died 1957) Catherine Dove (m. 1962; div. 1976) Judith Mitchell (m. 1976)
- Children: 6
- Education: Westminster School
- Alma mater: Brasenose College, Oxford
- Occupation: Politician; Diplomat; Broadcaster

Military service
- Allegiance: United Kingdom
- Branch/service: British Army
- Rank: Major
- Unit: Coldstream Guards, Rifle Brigade, 7th Armoured Division
- Battles/wars: World War II: North African Campaign

Major John Horace Freeman (19 February 1915 – 20 December 2014) was a British politician, diplomat, broadcaster, and British Army officer. He was the Labour Member of Parliament (MP) for Watford from 1945 to 1955.

== Early life ==
Freeman was born in a house in the Regent's Park neighbourhood of London on 19 February 1915, the son of a barrister. The family later moved to Brondesbury. He joined the Labour Party whilst a student at Westminster School in the early 1930s, and later obtained his degree at Brasenose College, Oxford. He worked for a time at the advertising firm Ashley Courtenay.

== Career ==
=== Military service ===
During World War II, Freeman saw active service in the Middle East, North Africa, Italy and North West Europe. He enlisted in the Coldstream Guards, was commissioned in the Rifle Brigade in 1940 and served in Britain's 7th Armoured Division (the "Desert Rats"). Bernard Montgomery called him "my best brigade major". He was appointed MBE in 1943.

=== Political career ===
After Freeman's return to Britain, he was selected as Labour candidate for Watford and was elected as a Member of Parliament in the 1945 election.

In September 1947, Freeman was appointed Vice-President of the Army Council, the supreme administering body of the British Army.

Freeman was originally on the Bevanite left wing of the party, although also supported by Hugh Dalton, who liked to go 'talent-spotting' among young MPs. He rose quickly through the ministerial ranks, but resigned along with Aneurin Bevan and Harold Wilson in 1951 over National Health Service charges. He stood down as an MP at the 1955 general election.

=== Journalism and public career ===
Freeman became a presenter of Panorama and was editor of the New Statesman from 1961 to 1965. He also presented the BBC Television interview programme Face to Face.

In 1962, Freeman described Richard Nixon, then bidding to become Governor of California, as “a man of no principle whatsoever except a willingness to sacrifice everything in the cause of Dick Nixon”. Later in the pages of the New Statesman he portrayed Nixon as "a discredited and outmoded purveyor of the irrational and inactive" whose 1964 defeat would be a "victory for decency." In the event Nixon did not run for President in 1964, but instead supported Barry Goldwater, who lost easily.

While Harold Wilson was Prime Minister, Freeman was appointed the High Commissioner to India (1965–1968). He was appointed to the Privy Council of the United Kingdom in 1966, and then Ambassador to the United States (1969–1971). As Henry Kissinger describes in his memoirs, this created an embarrassing situation for Wilson when Nixon won the election seven months after Freeman's appointment as ambassador; allegedly, Wilson had been predicting a Democratic victory. Wilson refused to fire Freeman or remove him from the guest list for a dinner at Downing Street during Nixon's first official visit in 1969. Kissinger wrote that the issue was resolved when Nixon, who was sat opposite Freeman, made a toast at the end of the dinner:

"Some say there's a new Nixon. And they wonder if there's a new Freeman. I would like to think that that's all behind us. After all, he's the new diplomat and I'm the new statesman, trying to do our best for peace in the world."

Following this, the two became friends and Freeman "was the only Ambassador invited to the White House for social occasions during his first term". Kissinger said he "became one of my closest friends; that friendship has survived both our terms in office."

During Freeman's time in Washington, he also became a staunch fan of the Washington Redskins.

Freeman became Chairman of London Weekend Television Ltd in 1971, serving until his retirement in 1984. During this period, he wrote an article in 1981 which criticised what he saw as the heavy-handed, interventionist broadcasting policy of the British government, expressed in the ethos of the Independent Broadcasting Authority, and expressed views that would soon come to be closely associated with Margaret Thatcher and the deregulatory, laissez-faire new school of Conservative Party politics. He was director of several other companies in this period and President of ITN (1976–1981).

From 1985 to 1990, Freeman was Visiting Professor of International Relations at the University of California, Davis. Freeman was elected an honorary fellow of Brasenose College, Oxford, in 1968.

== Later life ==
Freeman retired to Barnes, London, removing himself to a military care home in south London in 2012.

When Morgan Morgan-Giles died on 4 May 2013, Freeman became the oldest surviving former MP. He was the last survivor of those elected to Parliament in 1945. Following the death of Tony Benn on 14 March 2014, he was also the last surviving member of the 1950 parliament and the last surviving MP under King George VI.

Freeman died on 20 December 2014, aged 99.

Parliament of the United Kingdom
Preceded by William Helmore	Member of Parliament for Watford; 1945–1955	Succeeded by Frederick Farey-Jones
Political offices
Preceded by Frederick Bellenger	Financial Secretary to the War Office; 1946–1947	Succeeded by (office merged into Under-Secretary of State for War)
Preceded by The Lord Pakenham	Under-Secretary of State for War; 1947	Succeeded by Michael Stewart
Media offices
Preceded by Kingsley Martin	Editor of the New Statesman; 1961–1965	Succeeded by Paul Johnson
Diplomatic posts
Preceded by Sir Paul Gore-Booth	High Commissioner to India; 1965–1968	Succeeded by Sir Morrice James
Preceded by Sir Patrick Dean	British Ambassador to the United States; 1969–1971	Succeeded by The Earl of Cromer
