= Jill Paton Walsh =

English author (1937–2020)

The Right Honourable The Lady Hemingford CBE FRSL
- Born: Gillian Honorine Mary Bliss; 29 April 1937; London, England
- Died: 18 October 2020 (aged 83); Huntingdon, Cambridgeshire, England
- Occupation: Author
- Known for: Knowledge of Angels
- Spouses: Antony Paton Walsh (m. 1961; died 2003) John Rowe Townsend (m. 2004; died 2014) Nicholas Herbert, 3rd Baron Hemingford (m. 2020)
- Children: 3
- Relatives: Alan Bliss (uncle)

Gillian Honorine Mary Herbert, Baroness Hemingford, CBE, FRSL (née Bliss; 29 April 1937 – 18 October 2020), known professionally as Jill Paton Walsh, was an English novelist and children's writer. She may be known best for her Booker Prize-nominated novel Knowledge of Angels and for the Peter Wimsey–Harriet Vane mysteries that continued the work of Dorothy L. Sayers.

== Personal life ==
Gillian Honorine Mary Bliss was born on 29 April 1937 to John Bliss, an engineer for the BBC who at his death had 363 patents to his name, and Patricia Paula DuBern, a homemaker.

She went with her mother and siblings to live with grandparents in St Ives, Cornwall, when she was three years old, because of the World War II bombings. In 1944, after the grandmother had died, Bliss returned to London to live with her mother and her younger siblings, who had returned to London earlier. Bliss was educated at St Michael's Convent, North Finchley, London. She studied English at St Anne's College, Oxford, graduating in 1959, and lived in Cambridge.

After graduating, Bliss taught English at Enfield County Grammar School for Girls, but left her position in 1962, as she was expecting her first child. In the previous year she had married Antony Edmund Paton Walsh; they settled in Richmond, south-west London, and had one son and two daughters.

In the early 1970s, Jill met John Rowe Townsend and they began an affair. She left her first husband in 1986, when their youngest daughter turned 18.

Antony did not want a divorce because of his Roman Catholic faith. Jill and Townsend were married in 2004, after Antony's death on 30 December 2003. Townsend died in 2014.

In February 2020, she met Nicholas Herbert, 3rd Baron Hemingford (1934−2022), whom she married in September of that year. She died three weeks later, in October, of kidney and heart failure in hospital at Huntingdon, Cambridgeshire.

== Honours ==
In 1996, Paton Walsh was invested as a CBE for services to literature, and was elected a Fellow of the Royal Society of Literature. In 1998, she won the Phoenix Award from the Children's Literature Association, recognising A Chance Child as the best children's book published twenty years earlier that did not win a major award.

== On writing for children ==
In an essay on realism in children's literature, Paton Walsh stated that realism (like fantasy) is also metaphorical, and that she would like the relationship between the reader and her characters Bill and Julie in Fireweed to be as metaphorical as that between "dragons and the reader's greed or courage".

== Works ==
Knowledge of Angels (1993), a medieval philosophical novel, was shortlisted for the 1994 Booker Prize. Other adult novels include:

- Farewell, Great King (1972)
- Lapsing (1986), about Catholic university students
- A School for Lovers (1989), reworking of the plot of Mozart's Cosi fan tutte
- The Serpentine Cave (1997), based on a lifeboat disaster in St Ives
- A Desert in Bohemia (2000), which follows a group of characters in England and in an imaginary Eastern European country through the years between World War II and 1989

=== Imogen Quy ===
Paton Walsh wrote four detective stories that featured part-time college nurse Imogen Quy, and were set in the fictional St Agatha's College, University of Cambridge:

- The Wyndham Case (1993)
- A Piece of Justice (1995)
- Debts of Dishonour (2006)
- The Bad Quarto (2007)

=== Lord Peter Wimsey ===
In 1998, she completed Dorothy L. Sayers's unfinished Lord Peter Wimsey–Harriet Vane novel, Thrones, Dominations.

She followed this up with three more Lord Peter novels:

- A Presumption of Death (2002)
- The Attenbury Emeralds (2010)
- The Late Scholar (published on 5 December 2013 in the UK, and 14 January 2014 in North America)

=== Children's books ===
- Hengest's Tale (St Martin's Press, 1966), fiction, illustrated by Janet Margrie
- The Dolphin Crossing (1967), adapted for the stage by Ed Viney (2012)
- Word Hoard: Anglo-Saxon stories (1969?), by Paton Walsh and Kevin Crossley-Holland
- Fireweed (1969)
- Goldengrove (1972)
- The Dawnstone (1973), published by Hamish Hamilton
- Toolmaker (1973), picture book illus. Jeroo Roy
- The Emperor's Winding Sheet —Whitbread Prize for children's books (1974), a novel about the later years of the Byzantine Empire.
- The Butty Boy (1975), illus. Juliette Palmer
- The Huffler (1975), illus. Palmer
- The Island Sunrise: prehistoric Britain (1975); US subtitle, —nonfiction
- Unleaving (1976), sequel to Goldengrove —Boston Globe–Horn Book Award for fiction, 1976
- Crossing to Salamis (1977), picture book illus. David Smee
- The Walls of Athens (1977), picture book illus. Smee
- A Chance Child (1978)
- Children of the Fox (1978), illus. Robin Eaton
- The Green Book (1981), illus. Lloyd Bloom
- Babylon (1982)
- A Parcel of Patterns (1983)
- Lost and Found (1984), illus. Mary Rayner
- Gaffer Samson's Luck (1984) —Smarties Prize, 1985
- Birdy and the Ghosties (1989)
- Grace (1991)
- When Grandma Came (1992), picture book illus. by Sophy Williams
- Thomas and the Tinners (1995) — 1995 Carnegie Medal longlist

== Bibliography ==
- Garrett, Martin (2004). Cambridge: A Cultural and Literary History. Oxford: Signal Books. Archived from the original on 7 April 2011. With foreword by Jill Paton Walsh.
