= Raphael Tuck =

Sir Raphael Herman Tuck (5 April 1910 – 1 July 1982) was a British Labour Party politician and an academic and lawyer.

Born in Cricklewood, London in 1910, Tuck was the son of David Lionel Tuck and a great-grandson of Raphael Tuck, founder of Raphael Tuck & Sons, an art publishing company which became a leading publisher of postcards. He was educated at St Paul's School, and was awarded a BSc (Econ.) at the London School of Economics, an affiliated BA in law at Trinity Hall, Cambridge (where he was in the same year as his future parliamentary colleague Sam Silkin), and, finally, an LLM at Harvard University.

A political scientist and lawyer, he was constitutional advisor to the Premier of Manitoba and worked in special research at the Department of Labour in Ottawa, both in Canada. He became a barrister, called to the bar at Gray's Inn in 1951. He was Professor of Law at the University of Saskatchewan, Canada and Professor of Political Science at McGill University, Montreal, Canada and at Tulane University, New Orleans, United States.

Tuck was elected as the member of parliament (MP) for the English constituency of Watford in the Parliament of the United Kingdom in 1964, serving until 1979.

Parliament of the United Kingdom
Preceded by Frederick Farey-Jones	Member of Parliament for Watford; 1964–1979	Succeeded by Tristan Garel-Jones
