= 1943 Watford by-election =

UK Parliamentary by-election

The 1943 Watford by-election was held on 23 February 1943. The by-election was held due to the elevation to the peerage of the incumbent Conservative MP, Dennis Herbert. It was won by the Conservative candidate William Helmore.

1943 Watford by-election
Party	Candidate	Votes	%	±%
Conservative	William Helmore	13,839	53.9	−11.5
Common Wealth	Raymond Blackburn	11,838	46.1	N/A
Majority		2,001	7.8	−23.0
Turnout		25,677	38.0	+25.6
Conservative hold		Swing		
