= James Milner, 1st Baron Milner of Leeds =

British Labour Party politician

The Right Honourable The Lord Milner of Leeds MC PC

Deputy Speaker of the House of Commons Chairman of Ways and Means
- In office 16 August 1945 – 7 November 1951
- Speaker: Douglas Clifton Brown; William Morrison
- Preceded by: Charles Williams
- Succeeded by: Sir Charles MacAndrew
- In office 9 March 1943 – 30 May 1945
- Speaker: Douglas Clifton Brown
- Preceded by: Douglas Clifton Brown
- Succeeded by: Charles Williams

Deputy Chairman of Ways and Means
- In office 21 January 1943 – 9 March 1943
- Speaker: Edward FitzRoy
- Preceded by: Douglas Clifton Brown
- Succeeded by: Charles Williams

Member of the House of Lords Lord Temporal
- In office 20 December 1951 – 16 July 1967 as a hereditary peer
- Preceded by: Peerage created
- Succeeded by: The 2nd Baron Milner of Leeds

Member of Parliament for Leeds South East
- In office 1 August 1929 – 20 December 1951
- Preceded by: Henry Slesser
- Succeeded by: Denis Healey

Personal details
- Born: 12 August 1889
- Died: 16 July 1967 (aged 77)
- Party: Labour
- Education: University of Leeds
- Occupation: Solicitor

James Milner, 1st Baron Milner of Leeds, MC, PC (12 August 1889 – 16 July 1967), was a British Labour Party politician.

== Early life ==
Milner was educated at the University of Leeds and became a solicitor. He was a major in World War I and was wounded, awarded the Military Cross and bar for his service.

== Political career ==
He was a Leeds City Councillor and Deputy Lord Mayor of Leeds in 1928, and was also Chairman of Leeds Labour Party and President of Leeds Law Society. He later became deputy-lieutenant of the West Riding of Yorkshire.

He was elected as the Labour Member of Parliament (MP) for Leeds South East at a by-election in August 1929, and served until 1951. He became Chairman of Ways and Means and Deputy Speaker and led the British Group of the Inter-Parliamentary Union. He was made a Privy Counsellor in 1945.

In 1951, the Speaker of the House of Commons, Douglas Clifton Brown, had stepped down. As Chairman of Ways and Means, Milner wanted to be Labour's first-ever Speaker. However, the Conservatives, now the majority party, nominated William Morrison. The vote went along party lines – the first time the post had been contested in the 20th century – and Milner lost.

As some compensation, he was elevated to the House of Lords as Baron Milner of Leeds, of Roundhay in the City of Leeds, on 20 December 1951. Denis Healey replaced him in the subsequent by-election.

== Honours ==
- Military Cross and Bar (MC)
- 1914–15 Star
- British War Medal
- WWI Victory Medal
- Member of His Majesty's Most Honourable Privy Council (PC) (1945)
- Freedom of the City of Leeds (1967)

Coat of arms of James Milner, 1st Baron Milner of Leeds

Crest
Perched on a sword with point to the dexter Proper and hilt and pommel Or an owl also Proper gorged with a collar Sable thereon three mullets Argent pendent therefrom a pair of scales and resting on the dexter claw a portcullis chained Or.
Escutcheon
Gules on a chevron Ermine between in chief two bits Or and in base a rose Argent barbed and seeded Proper a teazel Sable.
Supporters
On either side an owl Proper gorged with a collar Sable thereon three mullets Argent pendent therefrom a portcullis chained Or.
Motto
Do Right And Fear Nothing

== Personal life ==
Milner married Lois Tinsdale Brown on 10 February 1917. They had three children:

- Hon. (Lois Elizabeth Florence) Zaidée Milner (born 9 January 1919, died 1980)
- (Arthur James) Michael Milner, 2nd Baron Milner of Leeds (born 12 September 1923, died 20 August 2003)
- Hon. Shelagh Mary Margaret Milner (born 8 March 1925)

Milner died in 1967 at the age of 77 and was succeeded in the barony by his only son, Michael. His remains and those of his daughter Zaidée are interred in the Garden of Remembrance at St John the Evangelist Church, Moor Allerton, Leeds.

== Sources ==
- Iain Dale, ed. (2003). The Times House of Commons 1929, 1931, 1935. Politico's (reprint). ISBN 1-84275-033-X.
- The Times House of Commons 1945. 1945.
- The Times House of Commons 1950. 1950.

Parliament of the United Kingdom
Preceded by Sir Henry Slesser	Member of Parliament for Leeds South East; 1929–1951	Succeeded by Denis Healey
Peerage of the United Kingdom
New creation	Baron Milner of Leeds; 1951–1967; Member of the House of Lords (1951–1967)	Succeeded by Michael Milner
