= Frederick Farey-Jones =

Member of Parliament for Watford
- In office 26 May 1955 – 25 September 1964
- Preceded by: John Freeman
- Succeeded by: Raphael Tuck

Personal details
- Born: Frederick William Jones; 21 May 1904 Carmarthen, Wales, United Kingdom
- Died: 18 February 1974 (aged 69)
- Party: Conservative

Frederick William Farey-Jones (originally Frederick William Jones, 21 May 1904 – 18 February 1974) was a British air industry executive and politician who served as Member of Parliament for Watford for nine years.

== Education ==
Jones was born in Carmarthen and educated at the Queen Elizabeth Grammar School in the town. His higher education was undertaken on the continent of Europe, at Paris, Liège and Geneva, out of which he obtained the degree of Doctor of Philosophy and also considerable experience in foreign languages (he spoke six languages fluently). In 1931 Jones married Lilian Ada Farey, and each of them took the hyphenated surname of Farey-Jones.

== Aviation ==
He went into the aviation business and became involved both with aircraft manufacturers and with airlines (both in the United Kingdom and in Europe). As an aviator himself he conducted important survey flights in Europe, in west and north Africa, and in the south Atlantic. His experience led to him being made a member of the council of the Air League of the British Empire. He established Farey-Jones (Insurance) Ltd, who specialised in insurance for the aviation industry.

== International co-operation ==
In December 1944, Farey-Jones was sent to the Washington Conference on air transport. He served on the drafting committee for the conclusions and was one of the principal advisers. After the Second World War, he was Chairman of Reconstruction Enterprises Association Ltd. He also led the re-establishment of the International Air Transport Association together with Col. Gorrell of the United States. He had earlier founded the Conference of International Air Traffic Operators.

== Politics ==
Farey-Jones held right-wing views and joined the Conservative Party. He was Conservative candidate for Goole at the 1950 general election; he was also chosen to fight Pembrokeshire at the 1951 general election, a seat which the Conservatives hoped to win back from the (then) left-wing Labour MP Desmond Donnelly. However, the Liberal Party decided to field their own candidate, splitting the vote.

== Parliament ==
In the 1955 general election Farey-Jones was adopted for Watford and succeeded in winning the seat from Labour, whose sitting MP John Freeman had retired at the election. In Parliament he became known as a rare speaker, but he supported the invasion of Suez and regretted that the troops were withdrawn. He often spoke about trade union issues, attacking left-wing and communist infiltration of the Electrical Trades Union among others.

Farey-Jones was also known for his international visits. He was a supporter of Spain and in 1958 was given the honour of being made a Knight Commander of the Order of Civil Merit; this was the first occasion since the Spanish Civil War that a Briton had been given this award. He had also visited Yugoslavia in the same year.

== Later life ==
After losing his seat at the 1964 general election, Farey-Jones returned to business. He was made a Master of the Worshipful Company of Horners in 1970.

Parliament of the United Kingdom
Preceded by John Freeman	Member of Parliament for Watford; 1955–1964	Succeeded by Raphael Tuck
