= Dennis Herbert, 1st Baron Hemingford =

British Conservative politician

The Right Honourable The Lord Hemingford KBE PC DL
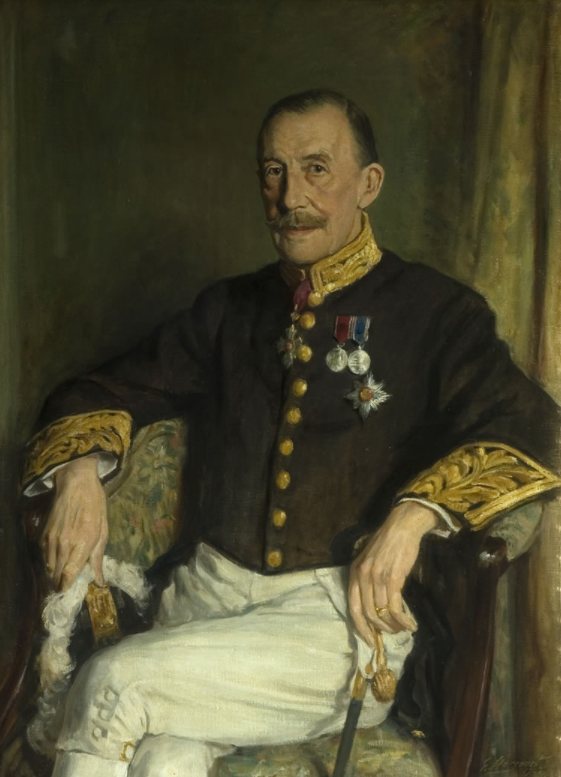
- A 1944 portrait of Herbert by George Harcourt

Deputy Speaker of the House of Commons Chairman of Ways and Means
- In office 11 November 1931 – 20 January 1943
- Monarchs: George V Edward VIII; George VI
- Speaker: Edward Fitzroy
- Preceded by: Robert Young
- Succeeded by: Douglas Clifton Brown

Deputy Chairman of Ways and Means
- In office 22 June 1928 – 3 July 1929
- Speaker: Edward Fitzroy
- Preceded by: Edward Fitzroy
- Succeeded by: Herbert Dunnico

Member of Parliament for Watford
- In office 14 December 1918 – 1 February 1943
- Preceded by: Arnold Ward
- Succeeded by: William Helmore

Personal details
- Born: Dennis Henry Herbert; 25 February 1869
- Died: 10 December 1947 (aged 78)
- Party: Conservative
- Spouse: Mary Graeme Bell (m. 1902)
- Children: 4, including Dennis

Dennis Henry Herbert, 1st Baron Hemingford, KBE, PC, DL (25 February 1869 – 10 December 1947) was a British Conservative politician.

== Early life ==
Herbert was the eldest son of Reverend Henry Herbert, Rector of Hemingford Abbots in Huntingdonshire.

== Political career ==
He was elected to the House of Commons as Member of Parliament (MP) for Watford at the 1918 general election, a seat he held until 1943.

From 1928 to 1929 he served as Deputy Chairman of Ways and Means and from 1931 to 1943 as Chairman of Ways and Means (Deputy Speaker of the House of Commons). Appointed a Knight Commander of the Order of the British Empire in 1929, Herbert was admitted to the Privy Council in 1933 and on 1 February 1943 he was raised to the peerage as Baron Hemingford, of Watford in the County of Hertford.

== Personal life ==
Lord Hemingford married Mary, daughter of Valentine Graeme Bell, on 9 June 1902.

Between 1918 and 1943, Herbert lived in a Victorian villa at 36 Clarendon Road, Watford. This locally listed building was later used as a registry office until it was demolished in 2015 by Hertfordshire County Council to make way for a block of flats and offices.

He died in December 1947, aged 78, and was succeeded in the barony by his son Dennis Herbert. Lady Hemingford died in 1966.

A 1944 portrait of Herbert by the Scottish painter George Harcourt hangs in the Watford Museum, and there are also photographic portraits of Herbert by the high-society portrait photographers Bassano & Vandyk in the collection of the National Portrait Gallery in London.

Parliament of the United Kingdom
Preceded by Arnold Ward	Member of Parliament for Watford; 1918–1943	Succeeded by William Helmore
Peerage of the United Kingdom
New creation	Baron Hemingford; 1943–1947	Succeeded by Dennis Herbert
