= Tristan Garel-Jones =

British politician (1941–2020)

The Right Honourable The Lord Garel-Jones PC
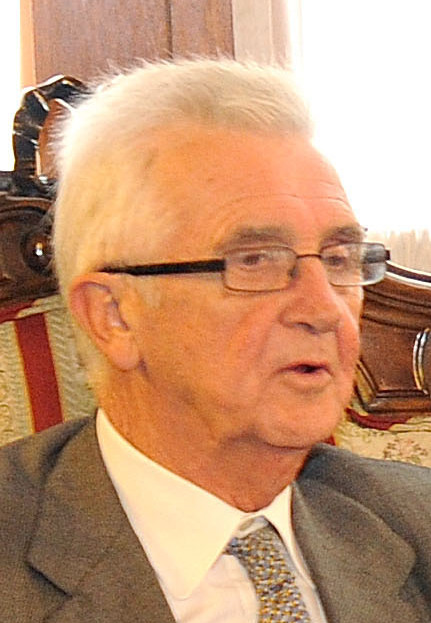

Minister of State for Europe
- In office 14 July 1990 – 27 May 1993
- Prime Minister: Margaret Thatcher; John Major
- Preceded by: Francis Maude
- Succeeded by: David Heathcoat-Amory

Deputy Chief Whip Treasurer of the Household
- In office 25 July 1989 – 14 July 1990
- Prime Minister: Margaret Thatcher
- Preceded by: David Hunt
- Succeeded by: Alastair Goodlad

Comptroller of the Household
- In office 26 July 1988 – 25 July 1989
- Prime Minister: Margaret Thatcher
- Preceded by: Robert Boscawen
- Succeeded by: Alastair Goodlad

Vice-Chamberlain of the Household
- In office 16 October 1986 – 26 July 1988
- Prime Minister: Margaret Thatcher
- Preceded by: Robert Boscawen
- Succeeded by: Michael Neubert

Member of the House of Lords
- Lord Temporal
- Life peerage 22 October 1997 – 24 March 2020

Member of Parliament for Watford
- In office 3 May 1979 – 8 April 1997
- Preceded by: Raphael Tuck
- Succeeded by: Claire Ward

Personal details
- Born: William Armand Thomas Tristan Garel-Jones; 28 February 1941 Gorseinon, Wales
- Died: 23 March 2020 (aged 79) Candeleda, Spain
- Party: Conservative
- Children: 5

William Armand Thomas "Tristan" Garel-Jones, Baron Garel-Jones, PC (28 February 1941 – 23 March 2020) was a British politician. A member of the Conservative Party, he served as the Member of Parliament (MP) for Watford from 1979 to 1997, before being made a life peer in 1997.

Following his election to Parliament, Garel-Jones served in various whip positions and also as a junior minister at the Foreign and Commonwealth Office.

== Early life ==
Born in Gorseinon, Wales, the son of Bernard Garel-Jones and Meriel (née Williams), he and his family moved to Las Palmas in the Canary Islands prior to settling in Madrid, Spain, when he was seven years old. Garel-Jones was educated at the King's School, Canterbury. His parents established successful language schools in Spain during this time. He moved back to the United Kingdom, and worked as a merchant banker prior to embarking on a career in politics.

== Parliamentary career ==
Garel-Jones first contested Caernarvon in February 1974, but was defeated by the future leader of Plaid Cymru, Dafydd Wigley. He was elected for Watford at the 1979 general election.

=== Whips Office ===
Viewed as an effective whip who successfully delivered parliamentary votes in favour of Thatcher's legislation, Garel-Jones was nonetheless seen as a mixture of Machiavelli and Ivan the Terrible by the Thatcherite right-wing. Although his loyalty to Thatcher was never questioned, nor his ability to stamp out a rebellion, his party's "dry" (right wing) flank associated him with the Conservative "wets" (centrist) faction. He was seen as being to blame for the "growing wetness" of Thatcher's government. His formidable reputation as an effective enforcer in the whips' office was said to have been the inspiration for the fictional scheming Whip Francis Urquhart in the novel House of Cards and subsequent BBC TV drama adaptation.

Others who knew him said "where Dobbs’ character was a cold, machiavellian schemer, Garel-Jones was in reality a warm and enthusiastic person who cared deeply about human rights, equality, and the advancement of humanist ideals."

=== Europe ===
Garel-Jones was a leading pro-European, and remained so, despite the Conservative party moving to a more Eurosceptic position by the end of the Thatcher era. This created suspicion among right-wing Thatcherites, who thought of him as one of the "wets". However, he voted for Margaret Thatcher in the first round of the leadership challenge by Michael Heseltine, but reserved the right to vote against her if it went to a second round. He subsequently voted for Douglas Hurd.

After he stepped down from the House of Commons in 1997, he was given a life peerage as Baron Garel-Jones, of Watford in the County of Hertfordshire.

== Other interests ==
Garel-Jones was a well-known Hispanophile. A dedicated defender of bullfighting, he worked as a bullfighting critic. He was also a supporter of Humanists UK, and a vice chairman of the All-Party Parliamentary Humanist Group. He was an honorary associate of the National Secular Society.

== Personal life ==
In 1966, Garel-Jones married Catalina Garrigues Carnicer, niece of the Spanish bullfighting critic Antonio Díaz-Cañabate. They had four sons and a daughter. He lived in Candeleda, Spain, and died there on 23 March 2020.

Garel-Jones was a firm atheist and humanist, but held strong respect for the right to freedom of religion or belief. He built a chapel for his wife Catalina on his estate so that she could practice her religion comfortably, as well as a bench outside the chapel where he could "smoke and contemplate more worldly concerns".

== In popular culture ==
Garel-Jones was portrayed by Hugh Fraser in the 2004 BBC production of The Alan Clark Diaries, and by Guy Henry in 2009's Margaret.

Parliament of the United Kingdom
Preceded by Raphael Tuck	Member of Parliament for Watford; 1979–1997	Succeeded by Claire Ward
Political offices
Preceded by Robert Boscawen	Vice-Chamberlain of the Household; 1986–1988	Succeeded by Michael Neubert
Preceded by Robert Boscawen	Comptroller of the Household; 1988–1989	Succeeded by Alastair Goodlad
Preceded by David Hunt	Treasurer of the Household; 1989–1990	Succeeded by Alastair Goodlad
Preceded by Francis Maude	Minister for Europe; 1990–1993	Succeeded by David Heathcoat-Amory
Party political offices
Preceded by David Hunt	Conservative Deputy Chief Whip in the House of Commons; 1989–1990	Succeeded by Alastair Goodlad
