= William Helmore =

British politician (1894–1964)

Air Commodore William Helmore CBE FCS FRAeS (1 March 1894 – 18 December 1964) was an engineer and Royal Air Force officer who had a varied and distinguished career in scientific research with the Air Ministry and the Ministry of Aircraft Production during the Second World War, as a broadcaster, and for two years as Member of Parliament for Watford 1943–1945.

== Early life ==
Helmore was educated at Blundell's School and the Royal Military Academy, Woolwich. He served in the First World War as a Royal Artillery officer and then transferred to the Royal Flying Corps as an observer and pilot. One result of this experience was his book Cavalry of the Air. After the war he went to Christ's College, Cambridge, and obtained a first class (honours) degree in mechanical sciences.

== Post WWI ==
In 1922, Helmore was granted a permanent commission as a flight lieutenant in the Royal Air Force and developed his interest in scientific research in aviation. He was also involved in the development of aerial refuelling, serving as co-pilot and hose handler on Sir Alan Cobham's pioneering flight from Portsmouth, England, to India on 22 September 1934, also inventing the electrolytic process of forming flame or explosion traps. In 1931 Helmore was awarded the Groves Prize for Aeronautical Research.

Helmore was promoted squadron leader on 1 October 1928 and wing commander on 1 July 1935, but retired from the RAF at his own request on 1 March 1937 to devote himself to research at Cambridge. He returned to the active list in August 1939 and was promoted honorary group captain on 21 May 1941 and later honorary air commodore.

== World War II ==
As senior scientific adviser to the Chief of Air Staff from 1939, Helmore was chiefly concerned with defeating the night bomber. Helmore with aeronautical engineer L.E. Baynes, nicknamed "The Baron", worked on the development of the Turbinlite, a 2,700 million candela (2.7 Gcd) searchlight fitted in the nose of Douglas Havoc night fighters. The light was intended to be used to illuminate attacking enemy bombers for defending fighters to then shoot down. Unfortunately certain practical difficulties brought the idea to nothing, but much of his work was subsequently incorporated in the Leigh light, an anti-submarine aircraft searchlight, which with the aid of radar was particularly deadly to German U-boats.

For the last four years of the war he was technical adviser to the Ministry of Aircraft Production, and was responsible for a number of other valuable inventions and, in 1942, he was selected as one of the eight members of the Brabazon Committee which sought to identify aircraft for Britain's post war transport needs.

Helmore's contribution, to Britain's war effort was not confined to scientific research. He had earlier broadcast such events as the Schneider Trophy air races and reviews, and during the war his accounts of the RAF's work were heard frequently. His most notable commentary was when he broadcast an eye-witness account of the D-Day landings in Normandy, the first 'live', (recorded live onto transcription disc for transmission later), broadcast from over the invasion fleet on 6 June 1944, reporting overhead from an RAF B-25 Mitchell bomber.

Helmore was Conservative Member of Parliament (MP) for Watford 1943–1945.

== Post war ==
After the war Helmore entered industry, being technical director to Castrol, a scientific consultant to ICI and director-general of the Aluminum Association.

In 1947 Helmore was invited by the Minister for Civil Aviation to become the chairman of the Brabazon Committee, to consider the certification of aircraft and approval of equipment. In addition he was the vice-chairman of a committee set up to review the licensing, recruitment and training of civil aviation personnel.

Helmore was a keen yachtsman, owning the schooner Allegro from 1929 to 1963.

Helmore married twice. His obituary in The Times records that he left two sons and three daughters of his first marriage but other reports say he had four children, Peter, Patrick, Peggy and Pamela. Peggie, his eldest daughter married Cuthbert Scott in 1942.

== Patents ==
GB patent 344806, William Helmore; Andrew Swan, "An improved trap for flame resulting from explosion of gases in a conduit", issued 2 March 1931
GB patent 351613, William Helmore, "Improved means for protecting internal-combustion engines for use on aircraft or other vehicles", issued 2 July 1931
GB patent 352550, William Helmore, "Improvements relating to the supply of fuel to internal combustion engines", issued 13 July 1931
GB patent 354398, William Helmore, "Improvements relating to fuel for internal combustion engines", issued 13 August 1931
GB patent 366947, William Helmore, "Improvements in and methods of using fuels in internal combustion engines", issued 3 February 1932
US patent 1849051, William Helmore, "Fuel oil for compression ignition systems", issued 8 March 1932, Assigned to Imperial Chemical Industries Ltd
US patent 1887305, William Helmore; Andrew Swan, "Device for use in association with gases or gas–liquid mixtures, as alpha flame or explosion trap, alpha mixer, alpha flow controller, alpha silencer, or alpha cooler", issued 8 November 1932
US patent 1887305, William Helmore and Andrew Swan, "Device for use in association with gases or gas–liquid mixtures, as a flame or explosion trap, a mixer, a flow controller, a silencer, or a cooler", issued 8 November 1932
DE patent 564899, William Helmore, "Verfahren zur Herstellung eines Brennstoffes fuer Brennkraftmaschinen mit Kompressionszuendung", issued 24 November 1932
GB patent 394736, William Helmore, "Improvements in or relating to testing combustible fluids", issued 6 July 1933
GB patent 398222, William Helmore; Ernest Walter John Mardles, "Improvements relating to lubricating oils", issued 11 September 1933
CA patent 338398, William Helmore and Ernest Walter John Mardles, "Lubricating Oil", issued 2 January 1934, assigned to CCWakefield &Co Ltd
GB patent 414410, Alan Arnold Griffith; William Helmore, "Means for preventing freezing of the induction systems of internal combustion engines", issued 3 August 1934
GB patent 417653, Ernest Walter John Mardles; William Helmore, "Improvements in the treatment of fuel spirits", issued 1 October 1934
GB patent 423510, Andrew Swan; William Helmore, "Improvements relating to preventing freezing of the induction systems of internal combustion engines", issued 4 February 1935
GB patent 423938, Ernest Walter John Mardles; William Helmore, "The inhibition of deterioration in olefinic oils and spirits", issued 11 February 1935
GB patent 427260, William Helmore; Alan Arnold Griffith, "Means for testing lubricating oils", issued 18 April 1935
US patent 2001164, Andrew Swan; William Helmore, "Induction system for internal combustion engines", issued 14 May 1935
US patent 2001164, William Helmore, "Induction system for internal combustion engines", issued 14 May 1935
GB patent 429682, Andrew Swan; Alan Arnold Griffith; William Helmore, "Improved means for regulating the supply of fuel and/or other fluids to internal combustion engines", issued 4 June 1935
CA patent 351407, Alan Arnold Griffith; William Helmore, "Lubricant Production", issued 2 July 1935, assigned to CCWakefield &Co Ltd
FR patent 784876, Andrew Swan; William Helmore, "Perfectionnements aux dispositifs d'aspiration de moteurs à combustion interne", issued 27 July 1935
US patent 2032279, Alan Arnold Griffith; William Helmore, "Treatment of lubricating oils", issued 25 February 1936, assigned to CCWakefield &Co Ltd
US patent 2032279, Alan Arnold Griffith and William Helmore, "Treatment of lubricating oils", issued 25 February 1936, Assigned to CCWakefield &Co Ltd
GB patent 446914, Alan Arnold Griffith; William Helmore, "Improvements in or relating to the exhaust systems of internal combustion engines", issued 8 May 1936
GB patent 446915, Alan Arnold Griffith; William Helmore, "Improvements in relating to the exhaust silencers of internal combustion engines", issued 8 May 1936
GB patent 446983, Andrew Swan; William Helmore, "Ice accretion indicator for aircraft and internal combustion engines", issued 11 May 1936
GB patent 449532, Andrew Swan; William Helmore, "Means for automatically preventing detrimental ice formation in aircraft", issued 22 June 1936
US patent 2045389, William Helmore; Alan Arnold Griffith, "Induction system for internal combustion engines", issued 23 June 1936, assigned to HM Hobson Aircraft & Motor
US patent 2045389, William Helmore and Alan Arnold Griffith, "Induction system for internal combustion engines", issued 23 June 1936, Assigned to H.M.Hobson (Aircraft and Motor) Components Limited
GB patent 473288, William Helmore, "An improved internal-combustion engine", issued 8 October 1937
FR patent 825380, William Helmore and Alan Arnold Griffith, "Perfectionnements apportés aux moteurs à combustion interne", issued 2 March 1938
US patent RE20775, Andrew Swan and William Helmore, "System for preventing detrimental ice formation", issued 28 June 1938, Assigned to H.M.Hobson (Aircraft and Motor) Components Limited
US patent 2137941, William Helmore and Alan Arnold Griffith, "Internal combustion engine", issued 22 November 1938
US patent 2137941, William Helmore and Alan Arnold Griffith, "Internal combustion engine", issued 22 November 1938
GB patent 510244, William Helmore, "Improved lubricating oils", issued 28 July 1939
GB patent 512689, William Helmore, "Improvements in plate heat exchangers for fluids", issued 22 September 1939
GB patent 526269, William Helmore, "Improvements in air speed indicators", issued 13 September 1940
GB patent 530824, William Helmore, "Improvements in flame or explosion traps", issued 23 December 1940
US patent 2229740, William Helmore, "Air speed indicator", issued 28 January 1941
US patent 2229740, William Helmore, "Speed Indicator", issued 28 January 1941
FR patent 865601, William Helmore, "Perfectionnements aux indicateurs de vitesse de l'air", issued 29 May 1941
GB patent 531610, William Helmore, "Improvements in flame or explosion traps", issued 8 January 1941
GB patent 542592, William Helmore, "Improvements relating to the control of the temperature of charges supplied to internal combustion engines", issued 19 January 1942
GB patent 548062, William Helmore, "Improvements in or relating to flame or explosion traps", issued 23 September 1942
CA patent 414919, William Helmore, "Engine charge temperature control device", issued 31 August 1943, assigned to Imperial Chemical Industries Ltd
US patent 2333567, William Helmore, "Electrolytic process of forming flame or explosion traps", issued 2 November 1943
US patent 2333567, William Helmore, "Electrolytic process of forming flame or explosion traps", issued 2 November 1943
CA patent 418103, William Helmore, "Flame or Explosion Trap", issued 1 February 1944
US patent 2372272, William Helmore, "Apparatus for controlling temperature of boosted charge of internal-combustion engines", issued 27 March 1945, assigned to Imperial Chemical Industries Ltd
US patent 2372272, William Helmore, "Apparatus for controlling temperature of boosted charge of internal-combustion engines", issued 27 March 1945, Assigned to Imperial Chemical Industries Ltd
US patent 2391311, William Helmore, "Lubricating composition", issued 18 December 1945, assigned to CCWakefield &Co Ltd
US patent 2391311, William Helmore, "Lubricating composition", issued 18 December 1945, Assigned to CCWakefield &Co Ltd
GB patent 574970, Frederick Sidney Cotton; William Helmore, "An improved method and means for intercepting night flying hostile aircraft", issued 29 January 1946
GB patent 575093, Frederick Sidney Cotton; William Helmore, "Improvements in or relating to searchlights for use in aircraft", issued 4 February 1946
GB patent 576118, Frederick Sidney Cotton; William Helmore, "Improvements in or relating to navigation lights for night-flying aircraft", issued 20 March 1946
GB patent 576214, William Helmore, "Improvements in or relating to the mounting of searchlights on aircraft", issued 25 March 1946
GB patent 579159, William Helmore, "Improvements in or relating to submersible watercraft driven by internal-combustion engines", issued 25 July 1946
US patent 2413350, William Helmore, "Air intake pipe for motor watercraft", issued 31 December 1946
US patent 2413350, William Helmore, "Air intake pipe for motor watercraft", issued 31 December 1946
US patent 2551124, William Helmore, "Lubricating compositions and additives therefor", issued 1 May 1951, assigned to CCWakefield &Co Ltd
US patent 2551124, William Helmore, "Lubricating compositions and additives therefor", issued 1 May 1951, Assigned to CCWakefield &Co Ltd
DE patent 832029, William Helmore, "Mineraloelschmiermittel", issued 24 March 1952
GB patent 743201, William Helmore, "Improvements in or relating to heat exchangers", issued 11 January 1956
GB patent 745914, William Helmore, "Improvements in or relating to heat exchangers", issued 7 March 1956
GB patent 745936, William Helmore, "Improvements in or relating to corrugated sheet material", issued 7 March 1956
CA patent 560166, William Helmore, "Lubricating compositions and additives therefor", issued 8 July 1958, assigned to CCWakefield &Co Ltd
GB patent 851758, William Helmore, "Improvements in or relating to means for collecting litter", issued 19 October 1960
US patent 3309795, William Helmore, "Mechanisms for simulating the movement of vehicles", issued 12 July 1961
FR patent 1301003, William Helmore, "Perfectionnements apportés aux agencements de simulation des mouvements des véhicules", issued 10 August 1962
GB patent 918705, William Helmore, "Improvements in or relating to mechanisms for simulating the movement of vehicles", issued 20 February 1963
CA patent 676942, William Helmore, "Mechanisms for simulating the movement of vehicles", issued 31 December 1963
GB patent 979495, William Helmore, "Improvements in or relating to mechanisms for simulating the movement of vehicles", issued 6 January 1965
GB patent 1004005, Air Commodore William Helmore, "Improvements in or relating to means for reducing the effect on the occupant of a vehicle of changes in the velocity of the vehicle", issued 8 September 1965

Parliament of the United Kingdom
Preceded by Sir Dennis Herbert	Member of Parliament for Watford; 1943–1945	Succeeded by John Freeman
