= Knowledge of Angels =

1994 novel by Jill Paton Walsh

- Author: Jill Paton Walsh
- Language: English
- Genre: Medieval philosophical novel
- Publisher: Houghton Mifflin (USA)/Colt Books (UK)
- Publication date: 1994
- Publication place: United Kingdom
- Media type: Print (hardback and paperback)
- ISBN: 0-552-99780-3
- OCLC: 59639821

Knowledge of Angels is a medieval philosophical novel by Jill Paton Walsh which was shortlisted for the 1994 Booker Prize. The book received mixed to positive reviews. Kirkus Reviews called it "an exquisitely mounted, immaculately designed fable." The Independent wrote "Contrived, often describing an idealised world but with luminous moments quite outside the normal run of contemporary fiction, this is a serious children's book for adult readers, and none the worse for that."

== Plot introduction ==
Jill Paton Walsh writes

At opposite ends of Grandinsula, a remote pre-reformation Christian island, shepherds find a creature with strange footprints stealing their lambs, and fishermen find a swimmer near exhaustion struggling towards the shore. The child cannot stand, eat or speak like a human being; the swimmer says he is a prince in the unheard of land of Aclar, and declares himself to be an atheist. Severo, Cardinal and Prince of the island, is confronted by a double conundrum. Could an atheist be in good faith? Not if the knowledge of God is inborn; then the atheist must once have known God, and reneged on the knowledge. If he is a renegade from the truth, he must be burned as a heretic; but Severo would dearly like to save him. How could it be found out whether everyone has inborn knowledge of God, since the teaching of the Church as best known to the greatest scholar on the island is unclear? Perhaps by teaching the wolf-child to speak, and then asking her... That will take time. Meanwhile, it is worth while trying to demonstrate the truth of God to the mysterious atheist in argument. What becomes of the argument, of the atheist, and of the wild child, and the effect of their fates on Severo, and the islanders who come in contact with either the Prince of Aclar, or the ferocious child Amara makes up the thread of the story. This is a fable about tolerance, and its conflict with moral certainty.

== Theme ==
Although set in an idyllic setting – "an island somewhat like Mallorca, but not Mallorca" – Knowledge of Angels is essentially tragic in outcome. The stranger Palinor, a modern thinker from a distant and advanced society named Aclar, is cast ashore on the beach of a medieval culture where faith is all. Eventually he suffers torture and death for his rationalist beliefs in individual choice. The thoughtful Cardinal-prince who rules Grandinsula uses the wolf-girl Amara as a blank slate in an attempt to establish whether a knowledge of God is inherent in the human condition.

Paton Walsh was careful to avoid making Severo a mere caricature; he is for his time an educated and thoughtful man whose intellectual horizons are restricted by his medieval faith. Thus he begins with humane discourse and proceeds to permit torture of his captive atheist to uncover "the truth." Much of the dialog the author uses in this section, and the details of the torture itself, were taken verbatim from the records of the Spanish Inquisition, who carefully wrote down their activities because they genuinely felt they were doing the work of their god by inflicting unimaginable agonies on their captives. Additionally, Severo's experiment is undermined by his underlings who incorrectly report the utterances of Amara as she begins to express her inner thoughts and conceptions. The real horror of the book lies in its depiction of well-intentioned people doing terrible things to those unfortunate enough to fall into their hands.

Severo's experiment ultimately leads not only to the death or disillusionment of individual characters but also to the implied destruction of their generally well-intentioned society by an avenging fleet from Aclar sighted by Amara as she flees back to the wilderness.
