= Michael Milner, 2nd Baron Milner of Leeds =

British solicitor and Labour Party politician

The Right Honourable The Lord Milner of Leeds

Member of the House of Lords
- Lord Temporal
- Hereditary peerage 20 October 1967 – 11 November 1999
- Preceded by: The 1st Baron Milner of Leeds
- Succeeded by: Seat abolished
- Elected Hereditary Peer; 11 November 1999 – 20 August 2003
- Election: 1999
- Preceded by: Seat established
- Succeeded by: The 3rd Baron Grantchester

Personal details
- Born: Arthur James Michael Milner; 12 September 1923 Leeds
- Died: 20 August 2003 (aged 79)

Arthur James Michael Milner, 2nd Baron Milner of Leeds (12 September 1923 – 20 August 2003), was a British solicitor and Labour Party politician.

== Biography ==
Milner was the only son of James Milner, 1st Baron Milner of Leeds, and was born in Leeds in 1923. He was educated in Oundle School and Trinity Hall, Cambridge, with an interruption of four years, when Milner served in the Royal Air Force as a Flight Lieutenant. He graduated with a Master of Arts in 1948, working then as solicitor in his family firm. In July 1967, he inherited his father's title.

Milner was Assistant Labour Whip from 1971 to 1974, and retired when Harold Wilson became prime minister again. After the House of Lords Act 1999, he was one of the 92 hereditary peers elected to remain in the House of Lords, a reference to his continual support for Labour and to his father. He was further a Member of the Worshipful Company of Clothworkers and Honorary Treasurer of the Society of Yorkshiremen in London between 1967 and 1970.

== Marriage and children ==
Milner married twice. Firstly, he married Sheila Margaret Hartley on 31 March 1951. They had three children:

- Hon. Geraldine Jane Milner (born 24 November 1954)
- Hon. Meredith Ann Milner (born 28 September 1956, died 31 December 1993)
- Richard James Milner, 3rd Baron Milner of Leeds (born 16 May 1959)

After his wife's death in 2000, Milner married secondly Helen Cutting Wilmerding in 2002. Milner died in 2003 at the age of 79 and was succeeded in the barony by his only son Richard.

== Arms ==
Coat of arms of Michael Milner, 2nd Baron Milner of Leeds

Crest
Perched on a sword with point to the dexter Proper and hilt and pommel Or an owl also Proper gorged with a collar Sable thereon three mullets Argent pendent therefrom a pair of scales and resting on the dexter claw a portcullis chained Or.
Escutcheon
Gules on a chevron Ermine between in chief two bits Or and in base a rose Argent barbed and seeded Proper a teazel Sable.
Supporters
On either side an owl Proper gorged with a collar Sable thereon three mullets Argent pendent therefrom a portcullis chained Or.
Motto
Do Right And Fear Nothing

== Notes ==
Peerage of the United Kingdom
| Preceded by James Milner | Baron Milner of Leeds; 1967–2003; Member of the House of Lords (1967–1999) | Succeeded by Richard Milner |
Parliament of the United Kingdom
| New office created by the House of Lords Act 1999 | Elected hereditary peer to the House of Lords under the House of Lords Act 1999; 1999–2003 | Succeeded by The Lord Grantchester |
