= Court of Referees =

The Court of Referees is a twelve-member committee of the Parliament of the United Kingdom, established in 1865. It is tasked with considering the rights of a petitioner (until 2017 known as their locus standi) to argue against a private bill, in cases where the promoters of the bill have challenged that right.

It is chaired by the Chairman of Ways and Means (the principal Deputy Speaker). The other members are the other two Deputy Speakers, the Speaker's Counsel (the Speaker's legal adviser) and eight backbench MPs.

Three of the court's members, or referees, form a quorum. The court meets rarely; Erskine May reporting in 2021 that "The court met once in 2016; prior to that meeting, it had last met in 2002".
