= Watford (constituency) =

Parliamentary constituency in the United Kingdom, 1885 onwards

Coordinates: 51°39′N 0°24′W

- Borough constituency for the House of Commons
- Interactive map of boundaries since 2024
- Location within the East of England
- County: Hertfordshire
- Electorate: 70,576 (March 2020)
- Major settlements: Garston, Watford

Current constituency
- Created: 1885
- Member of Parliament: Matt Turmaine (Labour)
- Seats: One
- Created from: Hertfordshire

Watford is a UK parliamentary constituency (Note: A borough constituency (for the purposes of election expenses and type of returning officer)) represented in the House of Commons since 2024 by Matt Turmaine, a member of the Labour Party.

== Constituency profile ==
The constituency comprises the whole of the Borough of Watford, together with the Hertsmere Borough ward of Bushey North, which is to the east of Watford town centre.

Watford has a considerable service sector economy, with several notable headquarters, and engineering, trade-craft, and distribution in its economy. However, it is also a commuter town to the City of London. British Waterways, J D Wetherspoon, Camelot Group, Iveco, manufacturers of commercial vehicles; part of Balfour Beatty; Bathstore, the largest bathroom retailer in the UK; construction firm Taylor Woodrow; and Mothercare are the largest of these. The borough is also the UK base of many multinationals including C. H. Robinson, Total Oil, TK Maxx, Costco, Vinci and Beko appliances. International golf tournaments such as the 2006 World Golf Championship have taken place at The Grove hotel.

Workless claimants who were registered jobseekers were in November 2012 lower than the national average of 3.8%, at 3.0% of the population based on a statistical compilation by The Guardian.

== History ==
Before the Redistribution of Seats Act 1885 the area was part of the three-seat constituency of Hertfordshire. Upon this act, it took up the western division of the county; however, later seats such as South West Hertfordshire, established in 1950, have reduced its reach, as settlements in those areas, and Watford itself, have grown.

Political history

The seat has been a bellwether of the national result since February 1974, and since 1945 has only voted against the winning party twice: in 1951 and 1970. Watford saw considerable Liberal Democrat opposition in 2005, achieving second place, taking many Labour votes with the Conservative candidate close behind.

Before the 2010 general election it was a three-way marginal seat in which local Tories, Labour supporters and Liberal Democrats aimed to garner support for their candidate. This election in Watford was won by Richard Harrington (Con) with 34.9% of the vote. The Liberal Democrats narrowly missed out on the seat with 32.4% of the vote and the defeat for Labour's candidate, Claire Ward, was a pronounced change with 26.7% of the vote.

In 2015, the result saw a significantly increased majority for Harrington of more than 9,000 votes over Labour, whilst the Liberal Democrats fell back to third. The 2017 election saw Labour significantly cut the Conservative majority to 2,092. Harrington retired at the 2019 election, when a new Conservative candidate, Dean Russell, increased the majority to 4,433 over Labour.

However, in the 2024 general election, Labour MP Matt Turmaine was elected with a majority of 4,723 votes, the first time the constituency was Labour since 2010.

Prominent frontbenchers

Dennis Herbert was Deputy Speaker from 1931 to 1943.

Major John Freeman was only a third-tier (junior) minister in the War Office as MP. His later unusually prominent positions in diplomacy led to his being appointed a member of the Privy Council and thereby being Rt Hon as of 1966.

Tristan Garel-Jones was Minister for Europe for three years of the Major ministry.

Both Herbert and Garel-Jones opted as peers in later life to use Watford as the territorial designation of their peerages.

== Boundaries and boundary changes ==
=== Historic ===
==== 1885–1918 ====
- Parts of the Sessional Division of Watford and Dacorum.

The constituency was established by the Redistribution of Seats Act 1885 (which followed on from the Third Reform Act) as one of four Divisions of the abolished three-member Parliamentary County of Hertfordshire, and was formally named as the Western or Watford Division of Hertfordshire. It included the towns of Watford, Rickmansworth, Hemel Hempstead, Berkhamsted and Tring.

==== 1918–1950 ====
- The Urban Districts of Bushey, Chorleywood, Rickmansworth, and Watford; and
- The Rural District of Watford parishes of Aldenham, Rickmansworth Rural and Watford Rural.

Aldenham was transferred from St Albans. Northern half of constituency, including Hemel Hempstead, Berkhamsted and Tring formed the majority of the new Hemel Hempstead Division.

==== 1950–1983 ====
Reconstituted as a Borough Constituency comprising the Municipal Borough of Watford. Remainder of the constituency formed the bulk of the new County Constituency of South West Hertfordshire.

==== 1983–1997 ====
Map of boundaries 1997–2024

- The Borough of Watford;
- The District of Three Rivers wards of Abbots Langley and Leavesden (transferred from South West Hertfordshire); and
- The District of St Albans wards of Park Street and St Stephens (transferred from the abolished South Hertfordshire constituency).

==== 1997–2024 ====
- The Borough of Watford; and
- The District of Three Rivers wards of Abbots Langley, Carpenders Park, Langleybury, Leavesden, and Oxhey Hall.

Three further wards in the Three Rivers District transferred from South West Hertfordshire. Park Street and St Stephens transferred to St Albans.

=== Current ===
Further to the 2023 review of Westminster constituencies, which came into effect for the 2024 general election, the composition of the constituency is as follows (as they existed on 1 December 2020):

- The Borough of Hertsmere ward of Bushey North
- The Borough of Watford.

The parts in the District of Three Rivers were transferred to South West Hertfordshire. In order to bring the electorate back within the permitted range, the Bushey North ward was moved in from the Hertsmere constituency.

== Members of Parliament ==
Hertfordshire prior to 1885

Election	Member	Party
1885	Frederick Halsey	Conservative
1906	Nathaniel Micklem QC	Liberal
1910	Arnold Ward	Conservative
1918	Dennis Herbert	Conservative
1943 by-election	William Helmore	Conservative
1945	Major John Freeman	Labour
1955	Frederick Farey-Jones	Conservative
1964	Raphael Tuck	Labour
1979	Tristan Garel-Jones	Conservative
1997	Claire Ward	Labour
2010	Richard Harrington	Conservative
September 2019	Richard Harrington	Independent
October 2019	Richard Harrington	Conservative
2019	Dean Russell	Conservative
2024	Matt Turmaine	Labour

== Elections ==
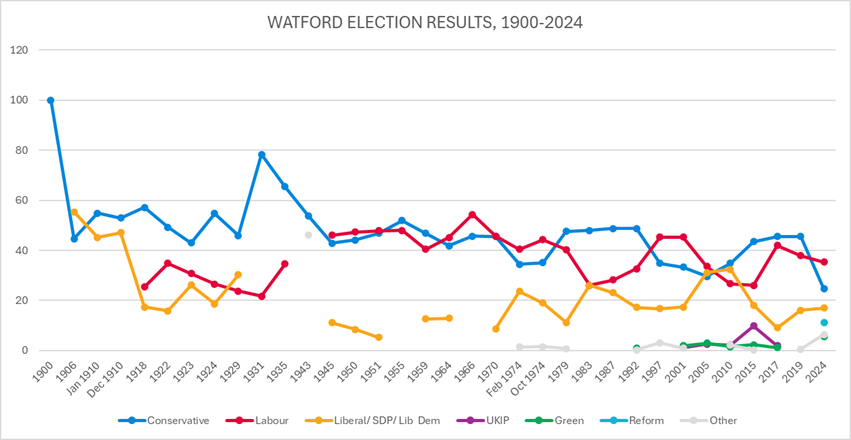
Election results 1900-2024

=== Elections in the 2020s ===
General election 2024: Watford
Party	Candidate	Votes	%	±%
Labour	Matt Turmaine	15,708	35.3	–4.0
Conservative	Dean Russell	10,985	24.7	–17.3
Liberal Democrats	Ian Stotesbury	7,577	17.0	–0.7
Reform	Gary Ling	4,930	11.1	N/A
Workers Party	Khalid Chohan	2,659	6.0	N/A
Green	Arran Bowen-la Grange	2,428	5.5	+5.2
Heritage	Sarah Knott	168	0.4	N/A
Majority		4,723	10.6	N/A
Turnout		44,455	60.9	–7.5
Registered electors		73,000		
Labour gain from Conservative		Swing	▲6.7	

=== Elections in the 2010s ===
2019 notional result
Party	Vote	%
Conservative	20,285	42.0
Labour	18,985	39.3
Liberal Democrats	8,570	17.7
Others	333	0.7
Green	125	0.3
Turnout	48,298	68.4
Electorate	70,576	

General election 2019: Watford
Party	Candidate	Votes	%	±%
Conservative	Dean Russell	26,421	45.5	–0.1
Labour	Chris Ostrowski	21,988	37.9	–4.1
Liberal Democrats	Ian Stotesbury	9,323	16.1	+7.0
SDP	Michael McGetrick	333	0.6	N/A
Majority		4,433	7.6	+4.0
Turnout		58,065	69.7	+1.9
Conservative hold		Swing	+2.0	

General election 2017: Watford
Party	Candidate	Votes	%	±%
Conservative	Richard Harrington	26,731	45.6	+2.1
Labour	Chris Ostrowski	24,639	42.0	+16.0
Liberal Democrats	Ian Stotesbury	5,335	9.1	−9.0
UKIP	Ian Green	1,184	2.0	−7.8
Green	Alex Murray	721	1.2	−1.2
Majority		2,092	3.6	−13.9
Turnout		58,610	67.8	+1.2
Conservative hold		Swing	-6.9	

General election 2015: Watford
Party	Candidate	Votes	%	±%
Conservative	Richard Harrington	24,400	43.5	+8.6
Labour	Matthew Turmaine	14,606	26.0	−0.7
Liberal Democrats	Dorothy Thornhill	10,152	18.1	−14.3
UKIP	Nick Lincoln	5,481	9.8	+7.6
Green	Aidan Cottrell-Boyce	1,332	2.4	+0.8
TUSC	Mark O'Connor	178	0.3	N/A
Majority		9,794	17.5	+15.0
Turnout		56,149	66.6	−1.7
Conservative hold		Swing	+4.6	

General election 2010: Watford
Party	Candidate	Votes	%	±%
Conservative	Richard Harrington	19,291	34.9	+5.3
Liberal Democrats	Sal Brinton	17,866	32.4	+1.2
Labour	Claire Ward	14,750	26.7	−6.9
BNP	Andrew Emerson	1,217	2.2	N/A
UKIP	Graham Eardley	1,199	2.2	−0.4
Green	Ian Brandon	885	1.6	−1.4
Majority		1,425	2.5	N/A
Turnout		55,208	68.3	+3.5
Conservative gain from Labour		Swing		

Background to Conservative candidates

In July 2007 former candidate Ali Miraj, a candidate for Aberavon in 2001, was dropped from the candidates list by the Conservative Party after he complained about David Cameron's leadership style and allegedly demanded a peerage. The public selected his former campaign manager Ian Oakley, who had been a candidate for Newport East in 2001 in the first Open Primary to be organised by the Conservative Party in November 2006. In July 2008, Oakley, withdrew candidature after being arrested for conducting a campaign of harassment against the local Liberal Democrats, for which he was convicted and given an 18-week suspended prison sentence and 12-month supervision order on 13 October 2008.

In December 2008 Watford Conservative Association selected a new candidate, Richard Harrington.

=== Elections in the 2000s ===
General election 2005: Watford
Party	Candidate	Votes	%	±%
Labour	Claire Ward	16,575	33.6	−11.7
Liberal Democrats	Sal Brinton	15,427	31.2	+13.8
Conservative	Ali Miraj	14,634	29.6	−3.7
Green	Steve Rackett	1,466	3.0	+1.1
UKIP	Kenneth Wight	1,292	2.6	+1.4
Majority		1,148	2.4	−9.6
Turnout		49,394	64.8	+3.7
Labour hold		Swing	-12.8	

General election 2001: Watford
Party	Candidate	Votes	%	±%
Labour	Claire Ward	20,992	45.3	0.0
Conservative	Michael McManus	15,437	33.3	−1.5
Liberal Democrats	Duncan Hames	8,088	17.4	+0.6
Green	Denise Kingsley	900	1.9	N/A
UKIP	Edmund Stewart-Mole	535	1.2	N/A
Socialist Alliance	Jon Berry	420	0.9	N/A
Majority		5,555	12.0	+1.5
Turnout		46,372	61.1	−13.5
Labour hold		Swing	+0.8	

=== Elections in the 1990s ===
General election 1997: Watford
Party	Candidate	Votes	%	±%
Labour	Claire Ward	25,109	45.3	+11.3
Conservative	Robert Gordon	19,227	34.8	−13.3
Liberal Democrats	Andy Canning	9,272	16.8	0.0
Referendum	Philip Roe	1,484	2.7	N/A
Natural Law	Leslie Davis	234	0.4	+0.1
Majority		5,792	10.5	N/A
Turnout		55,236	74.6	−7.7
Labour gain from Conservative		Swing	+12.3	

General election 1992: Watford
Party	Candidate	Votes	%	±%
Conservative	Tristan Garel-Jones	29,072	48.8	+0.1
Labour	Michael J. Jackson	19,482	32.7	+4.5
Liberal Democrats	Mark Oaten	10,231	17.2	−5.9
Green	Jeremy Hywel-Davies	566	1.0	N/A
Natural Law	Leslie Davis	176	0.3	N/A
Majority		9,590	16.1	−4.4
Turnout		59,527	82.3	+4.4
Conservative hold		Swing	−2.2	

=== Elections in the 1980s ===
General election 1987: Watford
Party	Candidate	Votes	%	±%
Conservative	Tristan Garel-Jones	27,912	48.7	+0.7
Labour	Michael Jackson	16,176	28.2	+2.8
SDP	Fiona Beckett	13,202	23.1	−2.9
Majority		11,736	20.5	−1.5
Turnout		57,290	77.9	+3.8
Conservative hold		Swing	-1.8	

General election 1983: Watford
Party	Candidate	Votes	%	±%
Conservative	Tristan Garel-Jones	26,273	48.0	+0.3
SDP	Peter Burton	14,267	26.0	N/A
Labour	Ian Wilson	14,247	26.0	−14.3
Majority		12,006	22.0	+14.6
Turnout		54,787	76.1	−5.1
Conservative hold		Swing		

=== Elections in the 1970s ===
General election 1979: Watford
Party	Candidate	Votes	%	±%
Conservative	Tristan Garel-Jones	21,320	47.64	+12.5
Labour	Tony Banks	18,030	40.28	−4.0
Liberal	B Bodle	5,019	11.21	−7.8
National Front	Brent Cheetham	388	0.87	−0.6
Majority		3,290	7.36	N/A
Turnout		44,757	81.26	+4.0
Conservative gain from Labour		Swing	+8.3	

General election October 1974: Watford
Party	Candidate	Votes	%	±%
Labour	Raphael Tuck	19,177	44.28	
Conservative	Tristan Garel-Jones	15,220	35.14	
Liberal	Anthony Jacobs	8,243	19.03	
National Front	Jeremy Wotherspoon	671	1.55	
Majority		3,957	9.14	
Turnout		43,311	77.3	−7.7
Labour hold		Swing		

General election February 1974: Watford
Party	Candidate	Votes	%	±%
Labour	Raphael Tuck	18,884	40.47	
Conservative	David W. Clarke	16,089	34.48	
Liberal	David Jacobs	11,035	23.65	
National Front	Jeremy Wotherspoon	651	1.4	N/A
Majority		2,795	5.99	
Turnout		46,659	85.0	
Labour hold		Swing		

General election 1970: Watford
Party	Candidate	Votes	%	±%
Labour	Raphael Tuck	19,698	45.71	
Conservative	David W. Clarke	19,622	45.53	
Liberal	Colin G. Watkins	3,778	8.77	N/A
Majority		76	0.18	
Turnout		43,098	75.44	
Labour hold		Swing		

=== Elections in the 1960s ===
General election 1966: Watford
Party	Candidate	Votes	%	±%
Labour	Raphael Tuck	23,832	54.38	
Conservative	David W. Clarke	19,996	45.62	
Majority		3,836	8.76	
Turnout		43,828	82.87	
Labour hold		Swing		

General election 1964: Watford
Party	Candidate	Votes	%	±%
Labour	Raphael Tuck	20,224	45.18	
Conservative	Frederick Farey-Jones	18,744	41.87	
Liberal	Margaret Neilson	5,797	12.95	
Majority		1,480	3.31	N/A
Turnout		44,765	83.61	
Labour gain from Conservative		Swing		

=== Elections in the 1950s ===
General election 1959: Watford
Party	Candidate	Votes	%	±%
Conservative	Frederick Farey-Jones	21,216	46.85	
Labour	Renee Short	18,315	40.44	
Liberal	Ian S. Steers	5,753	12.70	N/A
Majority		2,901	6.41	
Turnout		45,284	84.82	
Conservative hold		Swing		

General election 1955: Watford
Party	Candidate	Votes	%	±%
Conservative	Frederick Farey-Jones	22,546	51.98	
Labour	Ashley Bramall	20,829	48.02	
Majority		1,717	3.96	N/A
Turnout		43,375	82.36	
Conservative gain from Labour		Swing		

General election 1951: Watford
Party	Candidate	Votes	%	±%
Labour	John Freeman	22,370	47.90	
Conservative	Sydney William Leonard Ripley	21,862	46.81	
Liberal	Hamilton Brinsley Bush	2,469	5.29	
Majority		508	1.09	
Turnout		46,701	87.18	
Labour hold		Swing		

General election 1950: Watford
Party	Candidate	Votes	%	±%
Labour	John Freeman	21,759	47.36	
Conservative	Max Bemrose	20,302	44.19	
Liberal	Hamilton Brinsley Bush	3,879	8.44	
Majority		1,457	3.17	
Turnout		45,940	87.14	
Labour hold		Swing		

=== Elections in the 1940s ===
General election 1945: Watford
Party	Candidate	Votes	%	±%
Labour	John Freeman	32,138	46.03	
Conservative	William Helmore	29,944	42.88	
Liberal	Henry Harben	7,743	11.09	N/A
Majority		2,194	3.15	N/A
Turnout		69,825	73.40	
Labour gain from Conservative		Swing		

1943 Watford by-election
Party	Candidate	Votes	%	±%
Conservative	William Helmore	13,839	53.9	−11.5
Common Wealth	Raymond Blackburn	11,838	46.1	N/A
Majority		2,001	7.8	−23.0
Turnout		25,677	38.0	−25.5
Conservative hold		Swing		

=== Elections in the 1930s ===
General election 1935: Watford
Party	Candidate	Votes	%	±%
Conservative	Dennis Herbert	28,196	65.42	
Labour	Stanley Walter Morgan	14,906	34.58	
Majority		13,290	30.84	
Turnout		43,102	63.55	
Conservative hold		Swing		

General election 1931: Watford
Party	Candidate	Votes	%	±%
Conservative	Dennis Herbert	34,076	78.34	
Labour	Frank Jacques	9,423	21.66	
Majority		24,653	56.68	
Turnout		43,499	71.01	
Conservative hold		Swing		

=== Elections in the 1920s ===
General election 1929: Watford
Party	Candidate	Votes	%	±%
Unionist	Dennis Herbert	18,583	45.9	−8.8
Liberal	Edward Terrell	12,288	30.3	+11.6
Labour	Herman Macdonald	9,665	23.8	−2.8
Majority		6,295	15.6	−12.5
Turnout		40,536	72.4	−0.7
Unionist hold		Swing	-10.2	

Corbett Ashby

General election 1924: Watford
Party	Candidate	Votes	%	±%
Unionist	Dennis Herbert	15,271	54.7	+11.7
Labour	Herbert Elvin	7,417	26.6	−4.2
Liberal	Margery Corbett Ashby	5,205	18.7	−7.5
Majority		7,854	28.1	+15.9
Turnout		27,893	73.1	+4.6
Unionist hold		Swing	+8.0	

General election 1923: Watford
Party	Candidate	Votes	%	±%
Unionist	Dennis Herbert	10,533	43.0	−6.2
Labour	Jimmy Mallon	7,532	30.8	−4.1
Liberal	Robert Allen Bateman	6,423	26.2	+10.3
Majority		3,001	12.2	−2.1
Turnout		24,488	68.5	−0.5
Unionist hold		Swing	-1.0	

General election 1922: Watford
Party	Candidate	Votes	%	±%
Unionist	Dennis Herbert	12,040	49.2	−8.0
Labour	Jimmy Mallon	8,561	34.9	+9.5
Liberal	Robert Allen Bateman	3,896	15.9	−1.5
Majority		3,479	14.3	−17.5
Turnout		24,497	69.0	+9.5
Unionist hold		Swing		

=== Elections in the 1910s ===
Frank Gray

General election 1918: Watford
Party		Candidate	Votes	%	±%
C	Unionist	Dennis Herbert	11,155	57.2	
	Labour	George Lathan	4,952	25.4	N/A
	Liberal	Frank Gray	3,395	17.4	
Majority			6,203	31.8	
Turnout			19,50	59.5	
	Unionist hold		Swing		
C indicates candidate endorsed by the coalition government.

== Election results 1885–1918 ==
=== Elections in the 1880s ===
General election 1885: Watford
Party	Candidate	Votes	%	±%
Conservative	Frederick Halsey	4,032	52.1	
Liberal	Sir George Faudel Faudel-Phillips, 1st Baronet	3,712	47.9	
Majority		320	4.2	
Turnout		7,744	77.2	
Registered electors		10,029		
Conservative win (new seat)				

General election 1886: Watford
Party	Candidate	Votes	%	±%
Conservative	Frederick Halsey	Unopposed		
Conservative hold				

=== Elections in the 1890s ===
Halsey

General election 1892: Watford
Party	Candidate	Votes	%	±%
Conservative	Frederick Halsey	4,802	57.0	N/A
Liberal	John Marnham	3,627	43.0	New
Majority		1,175	14.0	N/A
Turnout		8,429	76.4	N/A
Registered electors		11,037		
Conservative hold		Swing	N/A	

General election 1895: Watford
Party	Candidate	Votes	%	±%
Conservative	Frederick Halsey	Unopposed		
Conservative hold				

=== Elections in the 1900s ===
General election 1900: Watford
Party	Candidate	Votes	%	±%
Conservative	Frederick Halsey	Unopposed		
Conservative hold				

Micklem

General election 1906: Watford
Party	Candidate	Votes	%	±%
Liberal	Nathaniel Micklem	7,612	55.4	New
Conservative	Frederick Halsey	6,136	44.6	N/A
Majority		1,476	10.8	N/A
Turnout		13,748	82.1	N/A
Registered electors		16,741		
Liberal gain from Conservative		Swing	N/A	

=== Elections in the 1910s ===
Ward

General election January 1910: Watford
Party	Candidate	Votes	%	±%
Conservative	Arnold Ward	8,782	54.8	+10.2
Liberal	Nathaniel Micklem	7,231	45.2	−10.2
Majority		1,551	9.6	N/A
Turnout		15,983	90.4	+8.3
Conservative gain from Liberal		Swing	+10.2	

General election December 1910: Watford
Party	Candidate	Votes	%	±%
Conservative	Arnold Ward	8,043	52.9	−1.9
Liberal	Nathaniel Micklem	7,160	47.1	+1.9
Majority		883	5.8	−3.8
Turnout		15,203	85.8	−4.6
Conservative hold		Swing	-1.9	

General Election 1914–15:

Another General Election was required to take place before the end of 1915. The political parties had been making preparations for an election to take place and by July 1914, the following candidates had been selected;

- Unionist: Arnold Ward
- Liberal: Hedley Le Bas

== See also ==
- List of parliamentary constituencies in Hertfordshire
- List of parliamentary constituencies in the East of England (region)
