= Lord Lieutenant of Huntingdon and Peterborough =

Civil post in Huntingdon and Peterborough, England

This is a list of those people who served as Lord Lieutenant of Huntingdon and Peterborough in England during that county's short existence from 1965. The office was preceded by that of the Lord Lieutenant of Huntingdonshire, also taking part of the jurisdiction of the Lord Lieutenant of Northamptonshire, which continues to exist. In 1974, it was absorbed by the lieutenancy of Cambridgeshire.

== Lord Lieutenants of Huntingdon and Peterborough ==
- Ailwyn Fellowes, 3rd Baron de Ramsey 1965 – 30 July 1968
- Dennis Herbert, 2nd Baron Hemingford 30 July 1968 – 31 March 1974
