= William Goodhart, Baron Goodhart =

British politician

The Right Honourable The Lord Goodhart Kt QC

Member of the House of Lords
- Lord Temporal
- Life peerage 23 October 1997 – 15 May 2015

Personal details
- Born: 18 January 1933
- Died: 10 January 2017 (aged 83)
- Spouse(s): Celia Herbert, Lady Goodhart (m. 1966)
- Children: 3
- Parents: Arthur Lehman Goodhart (father); Cecily Carter (mother)

William Howard Goodhart, Baron Goodhart, Kt QC (18 January 1933 – 10 January 2017) was a British Liberal Democrat politician, a leading property and human rights lawyer, and a member of the House of Lords.

== Background and early life and career ==
William Goodhart was the son of Arthur Lehman Goodhart and Cecily Carter, and the brother of Charles Goodhart and Sir Philip Goodhart.

He was educated at Eton College, undertook national service from 1951 to 1953, and graduated with a law degree from Trinity College, Cambridge, in 1956, before winning a Harkness Fellowship to study law at Harvard University.

He was admitted to the bar in 1960 and made a Queen's Counsel in 1979. As a barrister he developed a specialist Chancery practice and appeared in a number of notable cases, including in particular (in the House of Lords) Street v Mountford. He also co-wrote (with Gareth Jones) a textbook on the subject of specific performance.

== Politics ==
A member of the Social Democratic Party, Goodhart contested the safe Conservative constituency of Kensington in both the 1983 and 1987 general elections.

After the SDP merged with the Liberals, he subsequently fought the Kensington by-election of 1988 under the new Social and Liberal Democrats banner, finishing a weak third.

In the 1992 general election he contested the winnable seat of Oxford West and Abingdon, now as a Liberal Democrats candidate. He finished second, in so doing cutting the Conservative majority by over 1,000 votes, to 3,539.

== Peerage ==
He was knighted on 14 February 1989 and was created a life peer as Baron Goodhart, of Youlbury in the County of Oxfordshire, on 23 October 1997. In the House of Lords, he served as a spokesman for the Liberal Democrats in several capacities, usually relating to legal matters, including as the Liberal Democrats' Shadow Lord Chancellor. Before the House of Lords Act 1999 he campaigned to reform the Upper House, and later in his career expressed frustration at its undemocratic nature.

He retired from the House of Lords on 15 May 2015.

== Humanism and ICJ memberships ==
A devoted humanist, Goodhart was a longtime member of the All Party Parliamentary Humanist Group, as well as the British Humanist Association (BHA). He was among a number of parliamentarians who in 2010 called for substantive reforms of public services in Britain following a BHA report into religious influence in public services.

From 2007 to 2009, Goodhart was the Chairman of JUSTICE, the UK section of the International Commission of Jurists, as well as serving as a Commissioner of the ICJ since 1993. He was elected as vice-president of the ICJ in 2002. He was an honorary associate of the National Secular Society.

== Private life ==
Goodhart married the Hon. Celia Herbert (born 25 July 1939), eldest daughter of the 2nd Baron Hemingford and younger sister of the 3rd Baron Hemingford, on 21 May 1966. They had three children:

- Annabel Frances Goodhart (born 22 August 1967; married to James Dallas; three daughters)
- Laura Christabel Goodhart (born 25 December 1970; married to William Watts; three sons)
- Benjamin Herbert Goodhart (born 29 December 1972; partner of Wendy Young; one son).
