= Baron Milner of Leeds =

Barony in the Peerage of the United Kingdom

Baron Milner of Leeds, of Roundhay in the City of Leeds, is a title in the Peerage of the United Kingdom. It was created on 20 December 1951 for the Labour politician James Milner. His only son, the second Baron, was one of the ninety elected hereditary peers that were allowed to remain in the House of Lords after the House of Lords Act of 1999. Like his father Lord Milner of Leeds sat on the Labour benches. As of 2018 the title is held by the latter's only son, the third Baron, who succeeded in 2003.

== Barons Milner of Leeds (1951) ==
- James Milner, 1st Baron Milner of Leeds (1889–1967)
- (Arthur James) Michael Milner, 2nd Baron Milner of Leeds (1923–2003)
- Richard James Milner, 3rd Baron Milner of Leeds (b. 1959)

There is no heir to the barony.

Coat of arms of Baron Milner of Leeds
Crest Perched on a sword with point to the dexter Proper and hilt and pommel Or an owl also Proper gorged with a collar Sable thereon three mullets Argent pendent therefrom a pair of scales and resting on the dexter claw a portcullis chained Or. Escutcheon Gules on a chevron Ermine between in chief two bits Or and in base a rose Argent barbed and seeded Proper a teazel Sable. Supporters On either side an owl Proper gorged with a collar Sable thereon three mullets Argent pendent therefrom a portcullis chained Or. Motto Do Right And Fear Nothing
