= Valentine Graeme Bell =

English civil engineer

Valentine Graeme Bell CMG (27 June 1839 – 29 May 1908) was an English civil engineer, best known for his work on the railway system of Jamaica.

== Life ==
Born in London on 27 June 1839, he was youngest son of William Bell, a merchant of Aldersgate Street who was subsequently official assignee in bankruptcy. Educated at private schools, and apprenticed in 1855 to Messrs. Wren & Hopkinson, engineers, of Manchester, he was taken on in 1859 by James Brunlees.

For Brunlees, Bell was resident engineer in 1863–5 on the Cleveland Railway, and in 1866–1868 on the Mont Cenis Railway, for which he superintended the construction of special locomotives in Paris in 1869–1870. While in charge of the Mont Cenis line he rebuilt for the French government the Route Impériale between St. Jean de Maurienne and Lanslebourg after its destruction by flood.

Bel was elected a member of the Institution of Civil Engineers on 4 May 1869, and in 1871 he set up in private practice in London. In 1872–1875 he carried out waterworks at Cádiz, for a company which then failed and involved him in monetary losses. With Sir George Barclay Bruce he constructed, during the same period, a railway for the Compagnie du chemin de fer du vieux port de Marseille.

In 1880, Bell took service under the Colonial Office, in Jamaica, where his major work was done. Until 1883 he was engaged in reconstructing the government railway in Jamaica between Kingston and Spanish Town, extending the line to Ewarton and Porus, and later to Montego Bay and Port Antonio. The governor Sir Henry Norman appointed him in 1886 a member of the legislative council.

In 1887, Bell became director of public works and held the post for 20 years. Under his direction the mileage of good roads was extended from 800 to near 2000; 110 bridges and most of the modern public buildings were built, and works for water-supply, drainage, and lighting were carried out. He unsuccessfully opposed the transfer, in 1889, of the government railways to an American syndicate; the government resumed possession in 1900.

Bell was made C.M.G. in 1903. He resigned his appointment in March 1908, returning to England in failing health, and died in London on 29 May 1908.

== Family ==
Bell married twice:

1. in 1864 Rebecca (died 1868), daughter of Alexander Bell Filson, M.D.; and
2. in 1882 Emilie Georgina, daughter of Francis Robertson Lynch, clerk of the legislative council of Jamaica.

By his first marriage he had a daughter and a son, Archibald Graeme Bell, who became director of public works in Trinidad, and by his second marriage two daughters and a son.
