= Bevan =

Origin
- Meaning: son of Evan
- Region of origin: Wales

Other names
- Related names: Beavan, Bevin

Bevan is a name of Welsh origin, derived from ab Ifan meaning "son of Evan" (Ifan being a variant of Ieuan, the Welsh equivalent of John). Notable people with the name include:

== Given name ==
- Bevan Congdon (1938–2018), New Zealand cricketer
- Bevan Davies, American musician
- Bevan Docherty (born 1977), New Zealand triathlete
- Bevan Dufty (born 1955), American politician
- Bevan Eatts, Australian politician
- Bevan French (born 1996), Australian rugby league footballer
- Bevan George (born 1977), Australian hockey player
- Bevan Griggs (born 1978), New Zealand cricketer
- Bevan Hari (born 1975), New Zealand field hockey player
- Bevan Kapisi (born 1981), Samoan footballer
- Bevan Meredith (1927–2019), Australian Anglican archbishop of Papua New Guinea
- Bevan Rodd (born 2000), Scottish rugby union player
- Bevan Sharpless (1904–1950), American astronomer
- Bevan Slattery, Australian technology entrepreneur
- Bevan Spencer von Einem (born 1946), Australian child killer and suspected serial killer
- Bevan Wilson (rugby union, born 1956), New Zealand rugby union international
- Bevan Wilson (rugby, born 1927) (1927–2012), Australian rugby union international and rugby player

== Surname ==
- Alan Bevan, Canadian bagpipe player
- Alonza Bevan (born 1970), English bass player
- Aneurin Bevan (1897–1960), Welsh politician
- Arthur Bevan (c. 1687–1742), Welsh lawyer and Member of Parliament
- Benjamin Bevan (1773–1833), British civil engineer
- Bev Bevan (born 1945), English drummer
- Bill Bevan (1913–1975), American football player and coach
- Billy Bevan (1887–1957), Australian film actor
- Brian Bevan (1924–1991), Australian rugby player
- Bridget Bevan (1698–1779), Welsh philanthropist
- Carl Bevan (1973–2024), British musician with 60 Ft. Dolls
- Cecil Bevan, British supporting and character actor on stage and screen
- Christopher Bevan (born 1937), Rhodesian sailor
- C. W. L. Bevan (1920–1989), Welsh chemist and academic
- Dai Bevan, Welsh rugby league footballer who played in the 1900s
- Dai Royston Bevan (1928–2008), Welsh rugby union and rugby league footballer
- David Bevan (disambiguation)
- Donald Bevan (1920–2013), American playwright and caricaturist
- Edward Bevan (disambiguation)
- Edwyn Bevan (1870–1943), English philosopher and historian
- Ellis Bevan (born 2000), Welsh rugby union player
- Emily Bevan (born 1982), English actress
- Fiona Bevan, English singer-songwriter
- Francis Bevan (1840–1919), English banker
- Frederick Bevan (1856–1939), singer and songwriter in UK and teacher in South Australia
- G. Phillips Bevan (1829–1889), English statistician
- Gloria Bevan, New Zealand writer
- Hal Bevan (1930–1968), American baseball player
- Hilary Bevan Jones (born 1952), British television producer
- James Bevan (rugby union) (1856–1938), Wales rugby union captain
- James David Bevan (born 1959), British High Commissioner to India
- Joe Bevan (born 2004), Scottish footballer
- John Bevan (disambiguation)
- Keira Bevan (born 1997), Welsh rugby union player
- Latalia Bevan (born 2001), Welsh gymnast
- Llewellyn David Bevan (1842–1918), Welsh Congregationalist minister in the US and Australia
- Mary Ann Bevan (1874–1933), English sideshow attraction
- Mathew Bevan (born 1973), British hacker
- Maurice Bevan (1921–2006), British baritone and composer
- Michael Bevan (born 1970), Australian cricketer
- Michael W. Bevan (born 1952), New Zealand biologist and professor
- Myer Bevan (born 1997), New Zealand footballer
- Natalie Bevan (1909–2007), British artist
- Nick Bevan (1942–2014), British rowing coach and school headmaster
- Paul Bevan (born 1984), Australian footballer
- R. A. Bevan (1901–1974), British advertising pioneer
- Robert Bevan (artist) (1865–1925), British painter, draughtsman and lithographer, father of R. A. Bevan
- Robert Cooper Lee Bevan (1809–1890), British banker
- Scott Bevan (born 1979), English footballer
- Scott Bevan (journalist) (born 1964), Australian journalist
- Sid Bevan (1877–1933), Wales and British Lions rugby union player
- Silvanus Bevan (1691–1765), Welsh apothecary
- Sophie Bevan (born 1983), British lyric soprano
- Stewart Bevan (1948–2022), British actor
- Stuart Bevan (1872–1935), British politician and barrister
- Taylor Bevan (born 2001), Welsh boxer
- Thomas Bevan (disambiguation)
- Tim Bevan (born 1958), New Zealand film producer
- Tony Bevan (born 1951), British painter
- Vince Bevan, Canadian policeman
- William Bevan (disambiguation)

== See also ==
- Beavan
- Beaven
- Bevin (disambiguation)
- Bevins
- Bevanism
