= Beavan =

Beavan is a surname of Welsh origin, meaning "son of Evan". Notable people with the surname include:

- Blake Beavan (born 1989), American professional baseball player
- Colin Beavan (born 1963), American non-fiction writer and internet blogger
- Charles Beavan (1805–1884), British barrister and law reporter
- George Beavan (born 1990), English footballer
- Jenny Beavan (born 1950), English costume designer
- John Beavan, Baron Ardwick (1910–1994), British journalist
- Margaret Beavan (1877–1931), English politician, Lord Mayor of Liverpool
- Ray Beavan, Australian rugby player
- Robert Cecil Beavan (1841–1870), British soldier and ornithologist
- Sean Beavan, American record producer

== See also ==
- Beavan's Hill, village in Herefordshire, England
- Beaven
- Bevan
- Bevin (disambiguation)
- Bevins
