= Boxted House =

House in Boxted, Essex, England

Coordinates: 51°57′44″N 0°54′33″E

Boxted House is a Grade II listed house in Boxted, Essex.

It was built in about 1830.

It was home to the advertising executive Bobby Bevan (1901-1974), the son of the painters Robert Polhill Bevan and Stanislawa de Karlowska, and his wife, Natalie Bevan (née Ackenhausen, 1909–2007), the artist and collector.
