= David Bevan =

David Bevan may refer to:

- David Bevan (footballer) (born 1989), Irish footballer
- David Bevan (judge) (1873–1954), judge of the Supreme Court of the Northern Territory
- Dai Bevan, Welsh rugby league footballer who played in the 1900s
- Dai Royston Bevan (1928–2008), Welsh rugby union and rugby league footballer who played in the 1950s
- David Gilroy Bevan (1928–1996), British Conservative politician
- David Bevan (cricketer) (born 1943), British cricket player
- David Bevan (banker) (1774–1846), British banker
- David Bevan (mathematician) (born 1961) English mathematician

== See also ==
- David Evans-Bevan (1902–1973), industrialist from south Wales
- Bevan (surname)
