= Senator McMahon =

Senator McMahon may refer to:

- Brien McMahon (1903–1952), U.S. Senator from Connecticut from 1945 to 1952
- Larry McMahon (1929–2006), Senate of Ireland
- Martin T. McMahon (1838–1906), New York State Senate
- P. J. McMahon (politician) (1888–1939), Nebraska Legislature
- Sam McMahon (born 1967), Senate of Australia

== See also ==
- Chad McMahan (fl. 1990s–2010s), Mississippi State Senate
