= Ultraconservatism =

Extreme conservative views

Ultraconservatism refers to extreme conservative views in politics or religious practice. In modern politics, ultraconservative usually refers to conservatives of the far-right on the political spectrum, comprising groups or individuals who are located to the right of those who hold mainstream conservative views, and continuing further right to include fringe parties.

Elements of ultraconservatism typically rely on cultural crisis; they frequently support anti-globalism – adopting stances of anti-immigration, nationalism, and sovereignty – and use populism and political polarization, with in-group and out-group practices. In the United States, the primary economic ideology for most ultraconservatives is neoliberalism. The use of conspiracy theories is also common amongst ultraconservatives.

== History by country ==
=== Americas ===
==== Argentina ====
President Javier Milei is a right-wing populist who is often referred to in the media as ultra-conservative or ultra-liberal. Milei's ideology is close to anarcho-capitalism or paleolibertarianism. The Libertad Avanza coalition, led by Milei is referred to as anti-establishment because it rejects Argentina's long-standing political legacy of Peronism.

==== Brazil ====
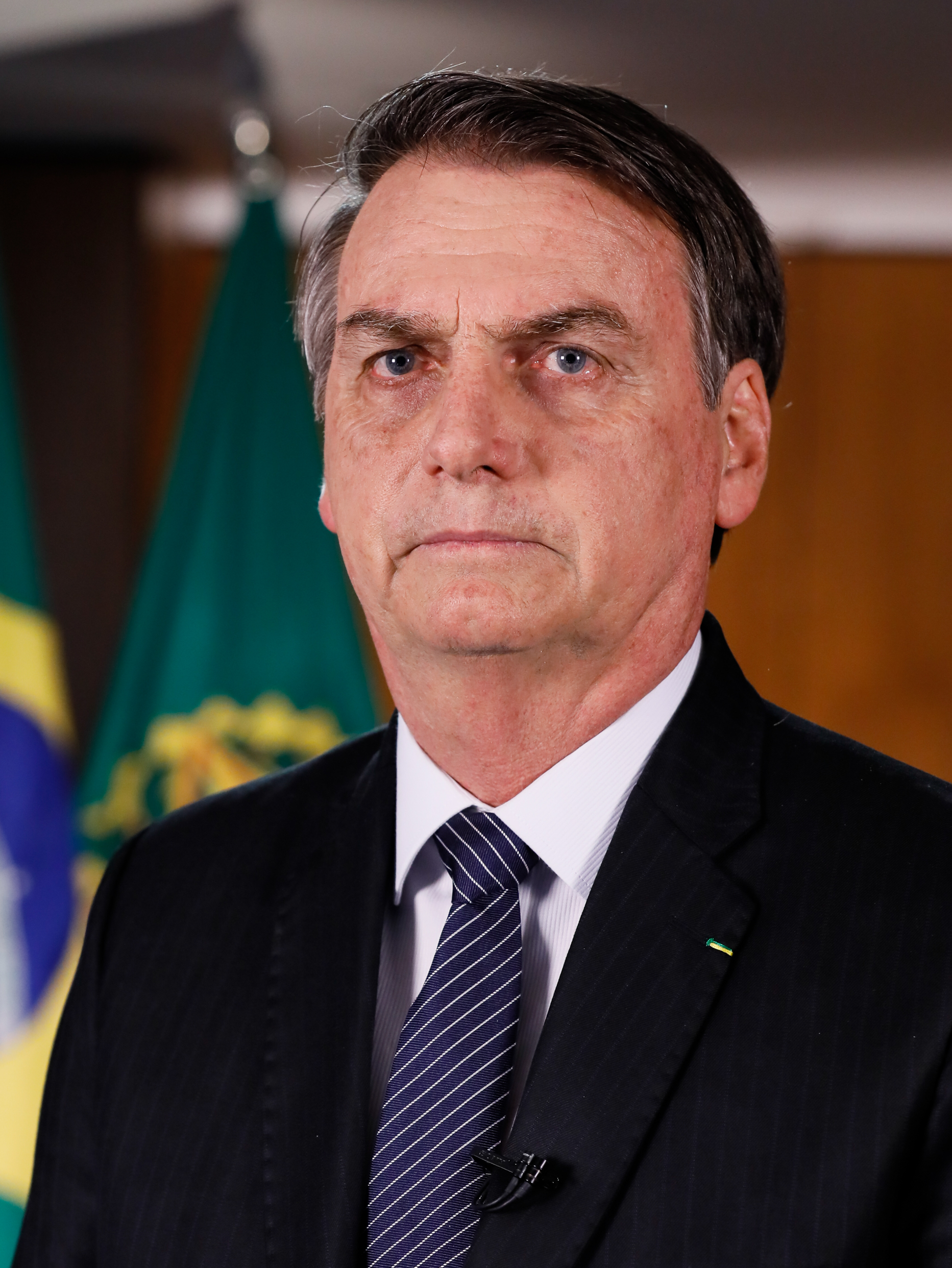
Jair Bolsonaro, 38th President of Brazil (2019–2023)

President Jair Bolsonaro was described as an ultraconservative during his tenure, often aligning his views with President Donald Trump. Upon taking office, Bolsonaro nominated ultraconservative Damares Alves to head the Ministry of Human Rights and Citizenship. His government would go on to be headed by elites who broadened extractivist activities in the Amazon rainforest, while having confrontations with the indigenous peoples in Brazil.

==== United States ====
In the United States, ultraconservatism first appeared when right-wing politicians and businesses led the opposition to the New Deal of President Franklin D. Roosevelt. Beginning in the 1960s, during the Cold War, ultraconservatism began to rise to prominence, especially with the radical right organization, the John Birch Society. At this time, ultraconservatives were anticommunist, and opposed to the civil rights movement, trade unions, and social programs. Members of the John Birch Society believed that the civil rights movement would lead to the creation of a Soviet Negro Republic in the Southern United States. In 1961, Jacob Javits would say that ultraconservatism "represents a danger to the Republican Party", as it was "moving the party farther to the right ... [which] would transform the Republican Party into a fringe party". Beginning in the 1970s, ultraconservatives attempted to establish their principles into the government and culture of the United States, with the use of think tanks, political action committees, and lobbyists. These groups were typically supported by wealthy individuals, including Richard Uihlein, John McIntyre, and George Coleman. Ultraconservatives would then "mark some groups, seemingly based on race, class, and immigration status", in an effort to polarize the public, saying that some groups were "parasitic" to the economy.

Early into the 21st century, the Second New Right became more ultraconservative, with some elements of neofascism, using nationalism to describe a "past national glory". Following the election of Barack Obama in 2008, ultraconservatives made alarmist statements about the United States debt ceiling, calling for large cuts to social spending and the elimination of some social programs entirely. During the Obama administration, ultraconservatives would organize around a message of "taking back our country" from Obama and creating the birther movement.

=== Asia ===
==== China ====
Xi Jinping, CCP General Secretary since 2012

During CCP general secretary Xi Jinping's leadership, the Chinese Communist Party (CCP) has become more closely related to ultraconservative and ultranationalist views, and is referred by some as having Han-centric elements. The Beijing Daily is a mainland Chinese newspaper, referred to by some as "ultraconservative".

==== Hong Kong ====
Some hardline pro-Beijing conservatives in Hong Kong have been referred to by critics as "ultraconservative".

==== Iran ====
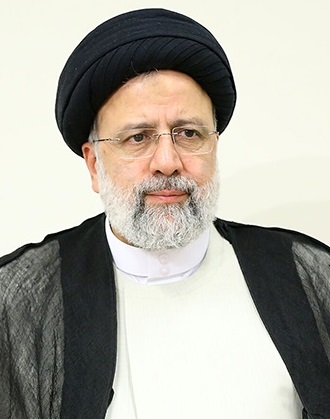
Ebrahim Raisi, 8th President of Iran (2021–2024)

"Ultra conservatives"—also known as "neoconservatives" or "neo-fundamentalists" are among the factions of the Iranian principalists. This grouping is more aggressive and openly confrontational toward the West. Many ultra- or neo-Principlists are laymen representing the Islamic Revolutionary Guard Corps (IRGC) collectively.

Socially, Iranian ultra-conservatives are defined by their hardline stance against cultural "Western toxification" (Persian: غرب‌زدگی, romanized: Gharbzadegī), which leads to the strict enforcement of religious moral norms. This ideological movement often targets women's rights and individual lifestyles, portraying them as a battleground against Western cultural imperialism.

==== Japan ====
Japan's far-right nationalist organization Nippon Kaigi has been described as "reactionary" or "ultraconservative" due to its support for the constitutional amendment of Article 9 of the Japanese Constitution, defense of the Empire of Japan, and denial of Japanese war crimes. Since 2006, all Japanese prime ministers from the conservative Liberal Democratic Party (LDP) have been affiliated with the Nippon Kaigi. Japan's current prime minister Sanae Takaichi and former prime minister Shinzo Abe were also referred to as "ultraconservatives"; they are members of Nippon Kaigi. Bryan Mark Rigg referred to the LDP itself as "ultraconservative".

=== Europe ===
Ultraconservative has occasionally been used interchangeably with fascism, ultranationalism, and right-wing populism when describing the radical right in Europe.

Europe of Sovereign Nations is a ultraconservative and ultranationalist political party belonging to the political groups of the European Parliament.

==== France ====
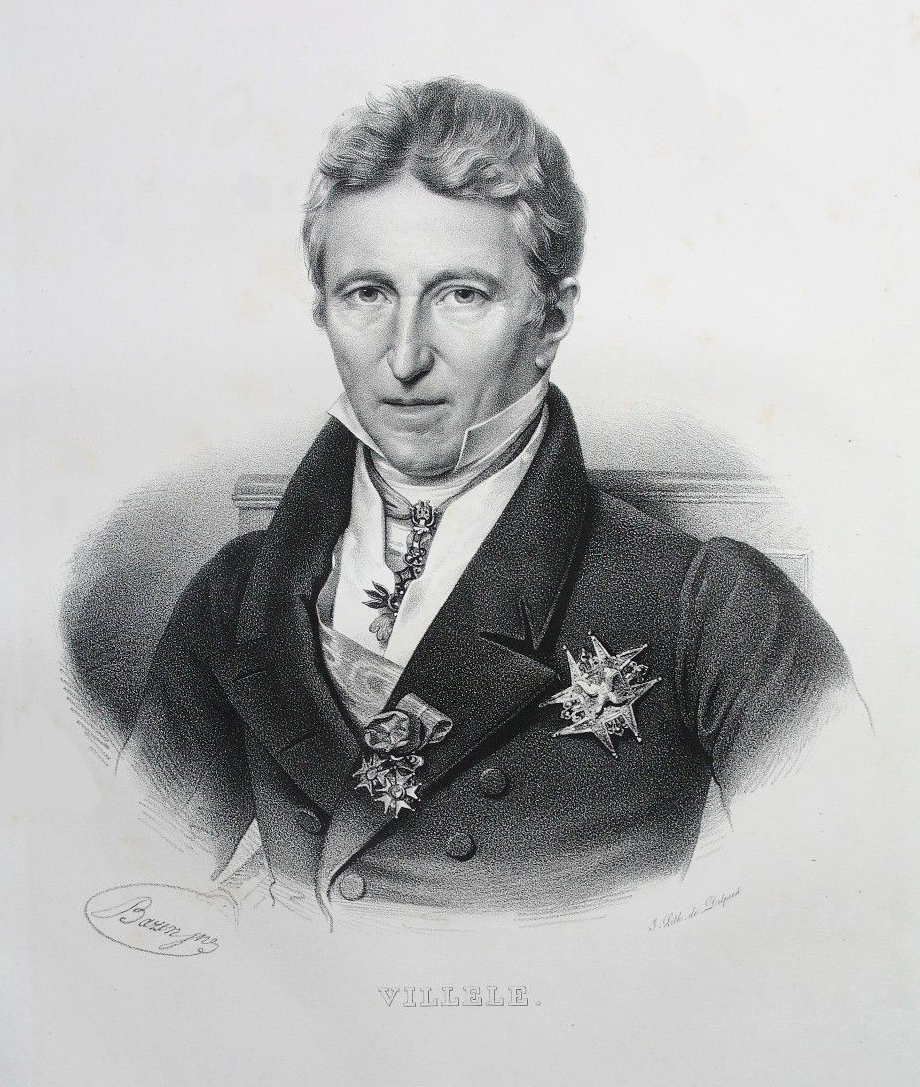
Jean-Baptiste de Villèle, Ultra-royalist Prime Minister of France from 1821 to 1828

The Ultra-royalists were an ultra-conservative faction from 1815 to 1830 under the Bourbon Restoration in France. An Ultra was usually a member of the nobility of high society who strongly supported Roman Catholicism as the state and only legal religion of France, the Bourbon monarchy, traditional hierarchy between classes and census suffrage against the interests of the bourgeoisie and their democratic tendencies.

Action Française is a French ultraconservative monarchist political movement. Its ideology was dominated by the precepts of Charles Maurras, following his adherence and his conversion of the movement's founders to royalism. The movement supported a restoration of the House of Bourbon and, after the 1905 law on the separation of Church and State, the restoration of Roman Catholicism as the state religion—all as rallying points in distinction to the Third Republic of France which was considered corrupt and atheistic by many of its opponents.

==== Germany ====
The Conservative Revolution (German: Konservative Revolution) was an ultraconservative movement in Germany prominent during the Weimar Republic—between World War I and the Nazi seizure of power—with intellectual exponents such as Oswald Spengler, Carl Schmitt, and Ernst Jünger. Plunged into what historian Fritz Stern has named a deep "cultural despair," uprooted as they felt within the rationalism and scientism of the modern world, theorists of the Conservative Revolution drew inspiration from various elements of the 19th century, including Friedrich Nietzsche's contempt for Christian ethics, democracy and egalitarianism; the anti-modern and anti-rationalist tendencies of German Romanticism; the vision of an organic and naturally-organized folk community cultivated by the Völkisch movement; the Prussian tradition of militaristic and authoritarian nationalism; and their own experience of comradeship and irrational violence on the front lines of World War I. From the 1960–1970s onwards, the Conservative Revolution has largely influenced the European New Right, in particular the French Nouvelle Droite and the German Neue Rechte.

==== Hungary ====
In its first years, Jobbik held ultraconservative stances, promoting anti-communism and anti-globalism as some of its core tenets, though it became more successful as its views became more moderate.

== In religion ==
In religion, "ultraconservatism" is characterized by anti-secularism, fundamentalism, hostility toward other religions and opposition to LGBTQ rights. Unlike ultraconservatives in secular politics, religious ultraconservatives can use anti-nationalism as an extension of anti-modernism; Haredi ultraconservative Satmar is against Zionism; Islamic fundamentalists are generally opposed to nationalism.

=== Christianity ===
==== Catholic Church ====
Robert Sarah, who was considered a likely candidate for pope (papabile) in the death of liberal-moderate Pope Francis in 2025, is widely considered an ultraconservative. Sarah is known for his staunch opposition to liberal theology, so-called gender ideology, and what he sees as the moral decline of Western secularism.

=== Falun Gong ===
Falun Gong is known for its views described as "ultra-conservative", including opposition to the Chinese Communist Party (CCP), espousing anti-evolutionary views, opposition to homosexuality and feminism, and rejection of modern medicine, among other views.

== See also ==
- Authoritarian conservatism
  - Para-fascism, conservatism with fascist characteristics
- Business nationalism
- Essex Junto
- Reactionary
- Ultra-Tories
