= Robert Bevan =

Robert Bevan may refer to:

- Robert Bevan (artist) (1865–1925), British painter, draughtsman and lithographer
- Robert Cooper Lee Bevan (1809–1890), British banker
- R. A. Bevan (1901–1974), British advertising executive
