= John Bevan =

John Bevan may refer to:

- John Bevan (cricketer) (1846–1918), Australian cricketer
- John Bevan (diver) (1943–2020), British naval officer, underwater diver and academic
- John Bevan (rugby) (born 1950), Welsh dual-code international who played rugby union for Cardiff and rugby league for Warrington
- John Bevan (rugby union) (1948–1986), Welsh international rugby union player for Aberavon RFC and later coach of the Wales national team
- John Bevan (politician) (1837–1911), New Zealand politician
- John Bevan (British Army officer) (1894–1978), World War II deception expert
- John M. Bevan (1924–2000), American academic and innovator
- John Bevan (figure skater) (born 1976), American figure skater
- John Bevan (musician) (born 1938), English clarinettist, saxophonist, conductor and orchestra leader
