= Natalie Bevan =

British artist, muse, and collector (1909-2007)

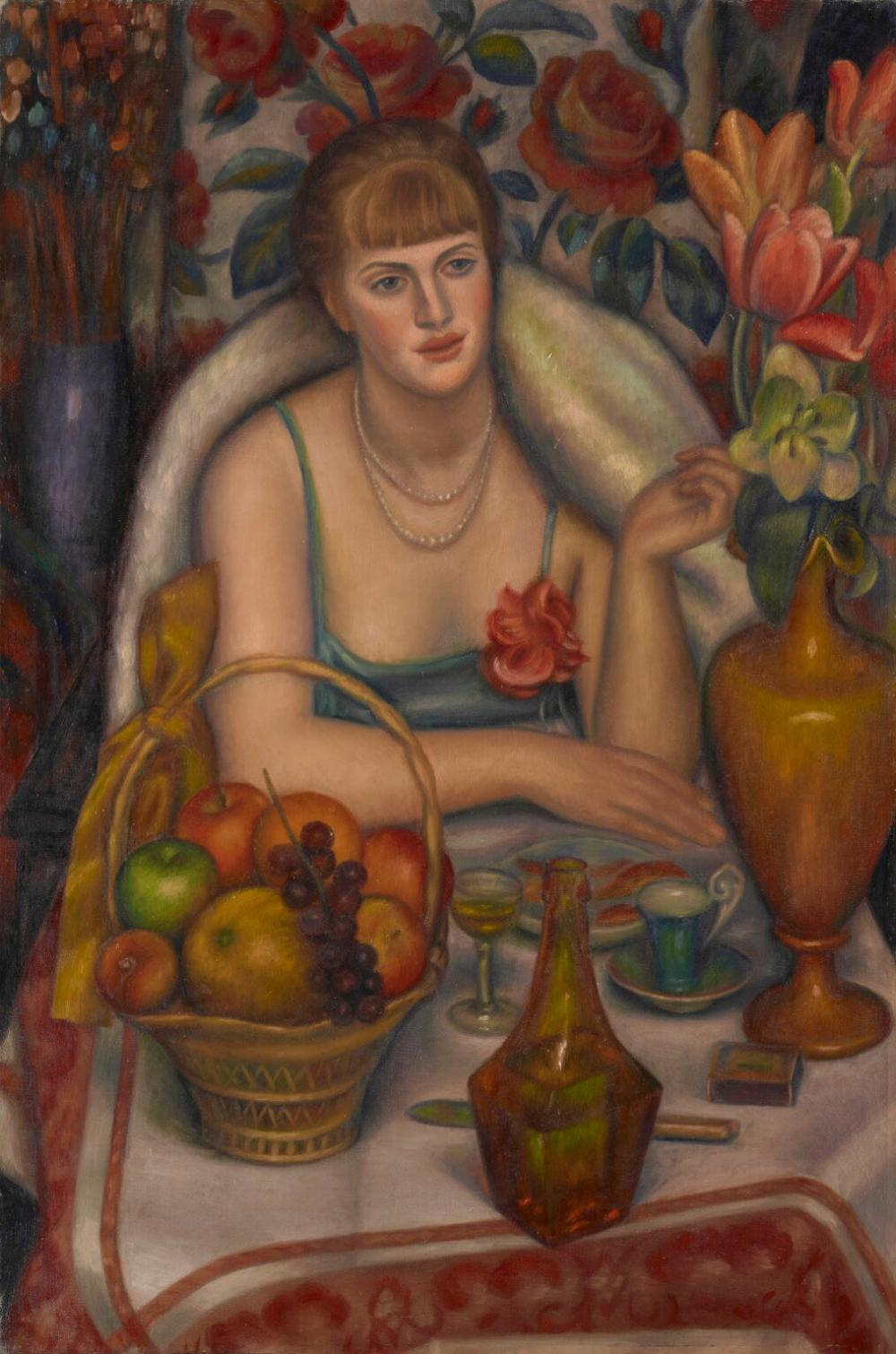
- Bevan in 1928
- Born: Natalie Alice Ackenhausen; 22 May 1909; Kensington, London, England
- Died: 15 August 2007 (aged 98); Great Horkesley, Essex, England
- Occupation(s): Artist, muse, and collector
- Spouses: Lance Sieveking (m. 1929; div. 1939) Bobby Bevan (m. 1948; died 1968) Samuel Barclay (m. 1986; died 2000)
- Children: 2

Natalie Alice Bevan (née Ackenhausen; 22 May 1909 – 15 August 2007), was a British artist, muse, and collector. She has been called, "one of the most beautiful and charismatic women of her generation".

== Early life ==
She was born Natalie Alice Ackenhausen on 22 May 1909 at 2 Pembroke Cottages, Edwardes Square, Kensington, London, the eldest of three children of Kurt Bernhard Heinrich Carl Ackenhausen (1878/79–1954), a German textile merchant, and his wife, Alice Katherine Inchbold Ackenhausen, née Denny (d. 1964/65), a children's book illustrator. During the First World War, the family took up her mother's surname, Denny, and her father changed his given name to Court.

== Career ==
She was painted by Mark Gertler when she was aged 19, a 1928 portrait entitled Supper.

She was a painter and ceramicist.

== Personal life ==
On 24 August 1929, she married the writer and pioneering radio and television producer Lancelot de Giberne Sieveking (1896–1972), and they had two daughters, the artist Victoria Burroughs (1930–1988) and the photographer Anthea Sieveking (born 1933). Their marriage was dissolved in 1939.

On 11 July 1946, she married the advertising executive Bobby Bevan (1901-1974), the son of the painters Robert Polhill Bevan and Stanislawa de Karlowska, and they lived in Knightsbridge, London, and at Boxted House in Boxted, Essex. In 1957, she became involved in a ménage à trois with Randolph Churchill, which continued until his death in 1968.

On 26 March 1986, she married the sailor and writer Samuel Barclay (1920–2000).

== Later life ==
She died on 15 August 2007, at Great Horkesley Manor, a nursing home in Great Horkesley, and was buried at St Peter's Church, Boxted, Essex.
