= Richard Blackmore =

English poet and physician

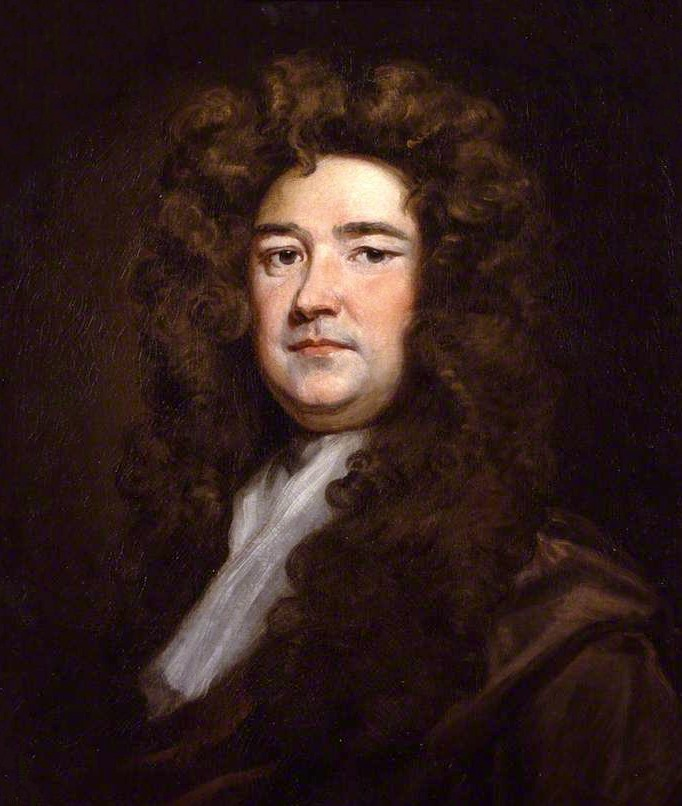
- Born: 22 January 1654; Corsham, Wiltshire, England
- Died: 9 October 1729 (aged 75); Boxted, Essex, England
- Occupations: poet, physician

Sir Richard Blackmore (22 January 1654 – 9 October 1729), English poet and physician, is remembered primarily as the object of satire and as an epic poet, but he was also a respected medical doctor and theologian.

== Earlier years ==
He was born at Corsham, in Wiltshire, the son of a wealthy attorney. He was educated briefly at Westminster School and entered St Edmund Hall, Oxford, in 1669 at 15. He received his Bachelor of Arts in 1674 and his MA in 1676. He was a tutor at the college for a time, but in 1682 he received his inheritance from his father. He used the money to travel. He went to France, Geneva, and various places in Italy. He stayed for a while in Padua and graduated in medicine at Padua. Blackmore returned to England via Germany and Holland, and then he set up as a physician. In 1685 he married Mary Adams, whose family connections aided him in winning a place in the Royal College of Physicians in 1687. He had trouble with the College, being censured for taking leave without permission, and he strongly opposed the project for setting up a free dispensary for the poor in London. This opposition would be satirised by Sir Samuel Garth in The Dispensary in 1699.

== Blackmore the epic poet ==
Blackmore had a passion for writing epics. Prince Arthur, an Heroick Poem in X Books appeared in 1695. He supported the Glorious Revolution, and Prince Arthur was a celebration of William III. The poem was based on the form of Virgil's The Aeneid and the subject matter of Geoffrey of Monmouth's Historia Regum Britanniae. It told of the Celtic King Arthur opposing the invading Saxons and taking London, which was a transparent encoding of William III opposing the "Saxon" James II and taking London. John Dennis derided the poem as being "servile" in its treatment of Geoffrey of Monmouth and having an inconsequential and fearful hero. Nevertheless, it went through three editions and William made Blackmore physician-in-ordinary (a position he would hold with Queen Anne as well), gave him a gold medal, and knighted him in 1697. William also assigned Blackmore the task of writing the official treatment of the plot of Sir George Barclay, who sought to kill William (not appearing until 1723, as A true and impartial history of the conspiracy against the person and government of King William III, of glorious memory, in the year 1695). In 1697, Blackmore followed that with King Arthur: an Heroic Poem in Twelve Books. Like its predecessor, it was a treatment of current events in ancient garb, but, this time, the public and court were less interested and the matter less interesting. Additionally, Blackmore took John Milton as his model, rather than Virgil, and he admitted in his preface that his previous book had been too adherent to the Classical unities.

Having used his epics to fight political battles, albeit safe ones at first, Blackmore was opposed by wits of the other camp, especially as time went on. Sir Samuel Garth attacked Blackmore's stance on the dispensary, only to be answered by Blackmore with A Satyr against Wit (1700). Tom Brown led a consortium of wits in Commendatory Verses, on the Author of the Two Arthurs, and a Satyr against Wit (1700). Blackmore had not only been explicitly partisan in his epics, but he had announced that epic was necessary to counter the degeneracy of poetry written by wits. He answered Brown and his friends with Discommendatory verses, on those which are Truly Commendatory, on the Author of the two Arthurs, and the Satyr against Wit (1700). However, John Dryden accused Blackmore of plagiarizing the idea of an epic on Arthur from him and called him a "Pedant, Canting Preacher, and a Quack" whose poetry had the rhythm of wagon wheels because Blackmore wrote in hackney cabs on his way between patients (prologue to The Pilgrim (1700)).

In 1705, with Anne on the throne and William dead, Blackmore wrote another epic, Eliza: an Epic Poem in Ten Books, on the plot by Rodrigo Lopez, the Portuguese physician, against Queen Elizabeth. Once more, the "epic" was current events, as it meant to denounce John Radcliffe, a Jacobite physician who was out of favor with Anne. Anne did not appear to take sufficient notice of the epic, but Sarah Churchill did. Two occasional pieces followed: An advice to the poets: a poem occasioned by the wonderful success of her majesty's arms, under the conduct of the duke of Marlborough in Flanders (1706) and Instructions to Vander Beck (1709). These courted favor with the Duke of Marlborough with some success.

In 1711, Blackmore produced The Nature of Man, a physiological/theological poem on climate and character (with the English climate being the best). This was a tune up for Creation: A Philosophical Poem in 1712, which was praised by John Dennis, Joseph Addison, and, later, Samuel Johnson, for its Miltonic tone. It ran to 16 editions, and of all his epics it was best received. Its design was to refute the atheism of Vanini, Hobbes and (supposedly) Spinoza, and to unfold the intellectual philosophy of Locke. Johnson thought that it would be the sole memory of Blackmore, and Dennis said that it was the English De Rerum Natura, but with infinitely better reasoning.

Blackmore ceased writing epics for a time after Creation. In 1722 he continued his religious themes with Redemption, an epic on the divinity of Jesus Christ designed to oppose and confute the Arians (as he called the Unitarians). The next year, he released another long epic, Alfred. The poem was ostensibly about King Alfred the Great, but like his earlier Arthurian epics, this one was political. It was dedicated to Prince Frederick, the eldest son of King George II, but the poem vanished without causing any comment from court or town.

While others approached the epic as a celebration of national origins (Dryden, for example) or sought in it the most lofty subject matter possible (as Edmund Spenser and John Milton had done), Blackmore argued that the form of the epic would "reform" poetry, that it would cease the cavils of wits and the sexuality of rakes. Further, while proclaiming his intention of reforming poetry itself, he used his epics quite often to achieve political, and personal, goals.

== Non-epic writing ==
Blackmore was a religious author when he was not a political author. In 1713 he and his friend John Hughes began a periodical modelled on The Spectator entitled The Lay Monk. It only ran from 13 November 1713 to 15 February 1714 and appeared once every three weeks during that period. All the same, Blackmore had its issues collected and published as The Lay Monastery in the year the journal foundered.

In 1716, he became censor as well as a director of the College of Physicians, but the Hanoverians were not as taken with Blackmore as William or Anne had been. In that year, he had two volumes of Essays upon Several Subjects published, with an attack on Alexander Pope in the second volume. In 1718, he again went to press with A Collection of Poems on Various Subjects, which collected shorter poems that had already been published.

Blackmore was very concerned with Protestantism. He joined the Society for the Propagation of the Gospel in America in 1704. He wrote Just Prejudices against the Arian Hypothesis, putatively against Deism and Unitarianism in 1721 and then, to help matters, wrote Modern Arians Unmasked in the same year. He also produced A New Version of the Psalms of David in 1721 and tried to get the Church of England to accept them as canonical translations. The next year, he resigned his governing position in the College of Physicians, and he also continued his campaign against supposed Arians with Redemption. In 1724, the Society for the Propagation of the Gospel was set to publish Blackmore's Psalms as official for America, but the Bishop of London, Edmund Gibson (a conservative, but a Whig), opposed the project and kept it from coming to fruition.

Finally, Blackmore attempted to answer Deism again with Natural Theology, or, Moral Duties Consider'd apart from Positive in 1728. In 1731, his last work, The Accomplished Preacher, was published posthumously.

== As a physician ==
Blackmore has come down, largely through the verse of Alexander Pope, as one avatar of Dulness, but, as a physician, he was quite forward thinking. He agreed with Sir Thomas Sydenham that observation and the physician's experience should take precedence over any Aristotelian ideals or hypothetical laws. He rejected Galen's humour theory as well. He wrote on plague in 1720, smallpox in 1722, and consumption in 1727.

He died in Boxted, Essex and was buried in his local parish church, where a monument was constructed.

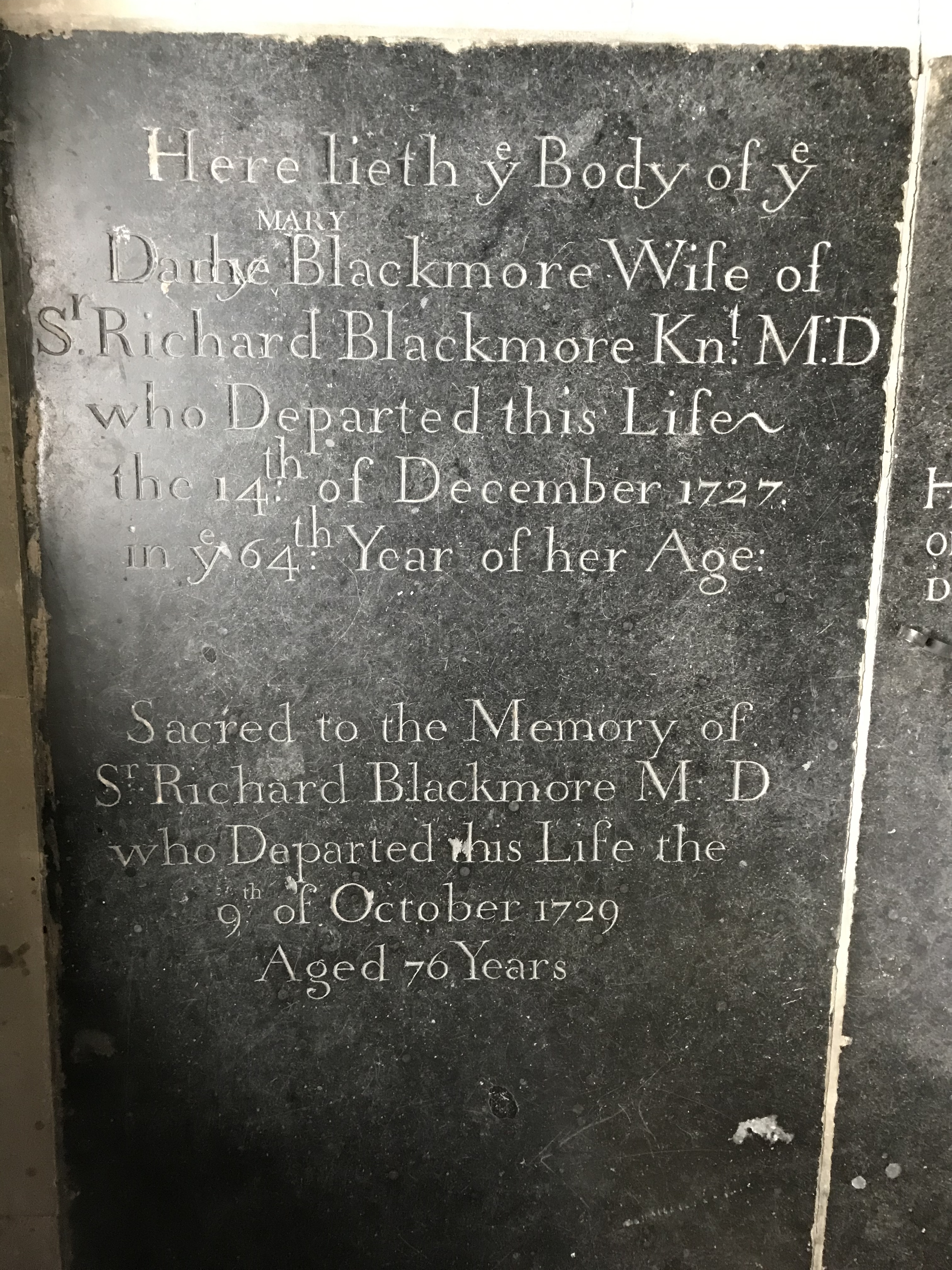
The grave of Richard Blackmore in the sanctuary of St Peter's Church, Boxted, Essex.

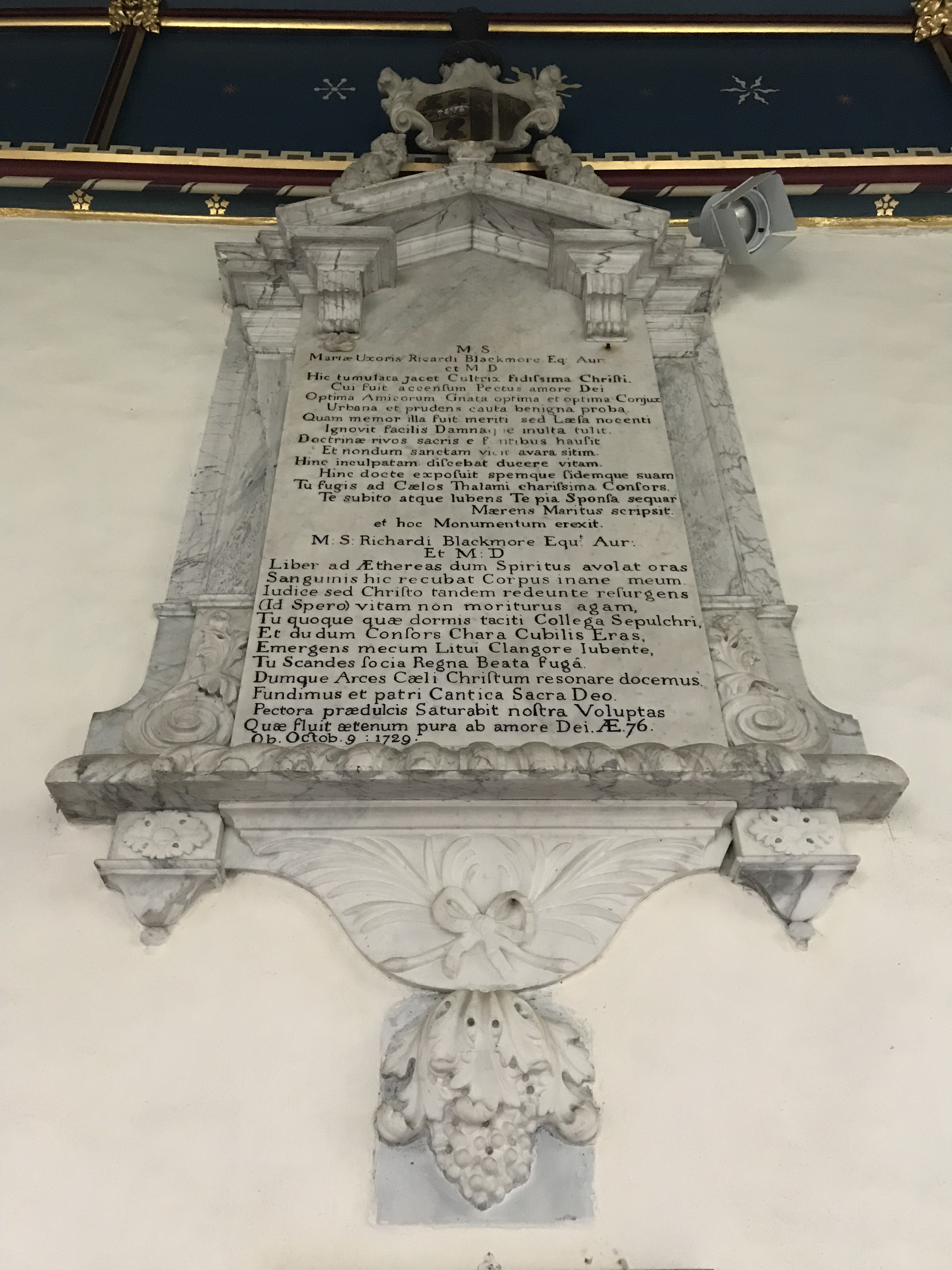
A memorial to Richard Blackmore in the chancel of St Peter's Church, Boxted, Essex.

== As a butt of satire ==
Blackmore's fame today rests with his enemies. Garth's The Dispensary made him out to be a greedy fool with delusions, but Pope's criticisms would be the most lasting, and Pope hits Blackmore over and over again on his stupidity and delusions of grandeur. The Scriblerus Club (Pope, John Gay, John Arbuthnot, Robert Harley, Henry St. John, Jonathan Swift, and Thomas Parnell) attacked Blackmore in 1717's Three Hours after Marriage. Pope further picked out Blackmore's foolish lines in Peri Bathos (1727) and gives a devastating characterization of "Neverending Blackmore" in The Dunciad (1728), where Blackmore's poetry is so awful that it can even put lawyers to sleep. These attacks were on top of Tom Brown's previous attacks, as well as Dryden's.

Blackmore's poetry is leaden. What further qualified him as a 'dunce' was his willingness to use poetry for the purposes of self-advancement. The self-interest involved in King Arthur was apparent to contemporaries, and the desperation of Alfred was similarly offensive to other poets. In addition, Blackmore used his poetry to vilify fellow poets, especially (but not exclusively) Tory poets, and that made him vulnerable to counter-attacks that he could not survive. Nevertheless, in his own time, he enjoyed the "approbation of Locke, and the admiration of Molineux." His poetry was also praised by Watts and Matthew Henry, who frequently quoted Blackmore's poems in his Commentary on the Whole Bible.
