= Bevins =

Bevins is a surname of Welsh origin, meaning 'the son of Evan.'.

- Anthony Bevins (1942–2001), British journalist
- Charles L. Bevins (1844–1925), British-American architect
- Christopher Bevins, American voice actor and ADR director
- George Bevins (1899–1970), American politician from Nebraska
- Ralph Bevins (1924–2017), American ice hockey goaltender
- Reginald Bevins (1908–1996), British politician
- Stuart Bevins (born 1967), English cricketer
- Vincent Bevins (born 1984), American journalist

== See also ==
- Beavan, surname
- Bevin (disambiguation)
- Bevins Prize, British award for investigative journalism
