= Bevin (name) =

Bevin is both a given name and a surname. It may refer to the following notable people:

== Given name ==
- Bevin Alexander (born 1929), American military historian and author
- Bevin Fortuin (1979–2025), South African rugby union player and head coach
- Bevin Hough (1929–2019), New Zealand sportsman
- Bevin Kelley, birth name of musician Blevin Blectum
- Bevin McKinney, key person at Rotary Rocket Company
- Bevin Prince (born 1982), American actress

== Surname ==
- Elway Bevin (c. 1554 – 1638), Welsh-born organist and composer
- Ernest Bevin (1881–1951), British politician and statesman
- Fred Bevin (1880–1940), English footballer
- James Bevin (died 1946), Anglican priest in the 20th century
- James Bevin (cricketer) (born 1992), New Zealand physician and former first-class cricketer
- Kerry Bevin, New Zealand politician
- Matt Bevin (born 1967), American businessman and politician; former governor of Kentucky (2015–2019)
- Newton P. Bevin (1895–1976), American architect.
- Michael Bevin (born 1977), New Zealand field hockey goalkeeper
- Patrick Bevin (born 1991), New Zealand professional road cyclist

== Fictional characters ==
- Bevin Evan Mirskey, a character from the American sitcom One Tree Hill
