= Peter Gutoski =

American politician (1911–1944)

Member of the Nebraska Legislature from the 8th district
- In office January 5, 1943 – April 15, 1944
- Preceded by: George Bevins
- Succeeded by: James A. Ryan
- In office January 3, 1939 – January 7, 1941
- Preceded by: P. J. McMahon
- Succeeded by: George Bevins

Member of the Nebraska House of Representatives from the 15th district
- In office January 1, 1935 – January 5, 1937
- Preceded by: P. J. McMahon
- Succeeded by: Position abolished

Personal details
- Born: May 22, 1911 DuBois, Pennsylvania
- Died: April 15, 1944 (aged 32) Omaha, Nebraska
- Cause of death: Car accident
- Party: Democratic
- Spouse: Hedrig Edna Butkus (m. 1932)
- Education: University of Omaha (LL.B.)
- Occupation: Attorney

Peter P. Gutoski (May 22, 1911 – April 15, 1944) was a Democratic politician from Nebraska who served as a member of the Nebraska House of Representatives from the 15th district from 1935 to 1937 and as a member of the Nebraska Legislature from the 8th district from 1939 to 1941 and again from 1943 until his death in 1944. He died in a car accident in Omaha, Nebraska.

== Early life ==
Gutoski was born in DuBois, Pennsylvania, in 1911, and grew up in Pennsylvania. He moved to Nebraska in 1929 to attend the University of Omaha, where he received his bachelor of laws degree in 1933.

== Nebraska House of Representatives ==
In 1934, when State Representative P. J. McMahon ran for the Douglas County Commission, Gutoski ran to succeed him in the 15th district. In the Democratic primary, he faced office manager Martin Hannigan, clerk Peter McShane, laborer Charles Uvick, and service station attendant Charles R. Wilfong.

Gutoski won the nomination with 35 percent of the vote, and advanced to the general election, where he faced Republican nominee Leo Kowalski. Gutoski defeated Kowalski with 63 percent of the vote.

== Nebraska Legislature ==
Effective with the 1936 election, the bicameral legislature was abolished and replaced with a unicameral legislature. Gutoski ran for the legislature in the newly drawn 8th district. He faced a crowded primary that included eight opponents. Gutoski narrowly placed first, winning 20 percent of the vote to former State Representative P. J. McMahon's 17 percent. They advanced to the general election, which McMahon won, defeating Gutoski with 52 percent of the vote.

In 1938, Gutoski challenged McMahon for re-election. He placed first over McMahon in the primary, and defeated him by a wide margin in the general election, receiving 58 percent of the vote to McMahon's 42 percent.

Gutoski ran for re-election in 1940, and was challenged by four opponents: packing house worker George Bevins, accountant John McKernan, and hotel manager John Powers. Gutoski placed first in the nonpartisan primary, winning 41 percent of the vote. He proceeded to the general election with Bevins, who placed second with 18 percent. The campaign between the two was close, and Bevins appeared to defeat Gutoski by 2 votes. Gutoski sought a recount before the state legislature, which concluded that Bevins won by 17 votes. Gutoski ultimately conceded the election.

In 1942, Gutoski challenged Bevins for re-election. Gutoski placed first in the primary by a wide margin, receiving 45 percent of the vote. He proceeded to the general election with Harold Caldwell, who won 24 percent of the vote, while Bevins received 23 percent. Gutoski defeated Caldwell with 55 percent of the vote.

Gutoski ran for re-election in 1944. He was challenged by perennial candidate Robert Druesedow, James A. Ryan, and John Powers. He won 53 percent of the vote, and prepared to face Druesedow in the general election. However, four days after the primary, Gutoski was killed in a car accident.
