= Murder Must Advertise =

1933 mystery novel by Dorothy L. Sayers

- First edition
- Author: Dorothy L. Sayers
- Language: English
- Series: Lord Peter Wimsey
- Genre: Mystery novel
- Publisher: Victor Gollancz
- Publication date: 1933
- Publication place: United Kingdom
- Media type: Print
- Pages: 352
- Preceded by: Have His Carcase
- Followed by: The Nine Tailors

Murder Must Advertise is a 1933 mystery novel by Dorothy L. Sayers, the eighth in her series featuring Lord Peter Wimsey. Most of the action of the novel takes place in an advertising agency, a setting with which Sayers was familiar as she had herself worked as an advertising copywriter until 1931. In 1990, Murder Must Advertise was placed 22nd in The Top 100 Crime Novels of All Time, a ranking by the members (all crime writers) of the Crime Writers' Association in Britain. A similar ranking was made in 1995 by the Mystery Writers of America, putting this novel in 56th place.

== Plot ==
Victor Dean, a copywriter at the advertising agency Pym's Publicity, has recently died in a fall down the office's spiral staircase. Dean's death appears suspicious, as he apparently made no attempt to save himself as he fell; and among his belongings is found an unfinished letter to the firm's owner, Mr Pym, warning of something 'undesirable' going on in the office. Pym engages the amateur detective Lord Peter Wimsey to investigate the scandal Dean claimed to have discovered. Under the name of Death Bredon (his middle names), Wimsey takes a job at the firm as Dean's replacement.

Various clues turn up: a catapult belonging to 'Ginger' Joe, the office boy; a carved stone scarab belonging to Dean; and £50 in banknotes found in the desk of Tallboy, one of the group managers. Meanwhile, Bredon befriends Pamela Dean, Victor's sister, so that she can get him into a cocaine-fuelled fancy-dress party hosted by Dian de Momerie, a socialite with whom Dean had been associating. Disguised as Harlequin, Bredon attracts the attention of Dian and later meets her several times, always in disguise. His presence annoys Dian's companion, Major Tod Milligan, who is supplying her with drugs.

After having a drink in a Covent Garden pub, newspaper reporter Hector Puncheon discovers that someone has slipped cocaine into his coat pocket. Chief Inspector Charles Parker, Wimsey's brother-in-law, suspects that Puncheon has stumbled on the drugs gang with which Milligan is associated, but finds no further suspicious activity there. It appears that the cocaine is being distributed from a different pub each week.

Puncheon spots a man he recognizes from the pub who is behaving suspiciously, and who almost immediately falls in front of a train and is killed. Searching the man's flat, Wimsey and Parker discover a telephone directory with the names of many pubs ticked off, including the one in Covent Garden. Wimsey deduces the mechanism by which the drug is circulated. One of Pym's major clients runs a newspaper advertisement every Friday, the headline for which is approved on the Tuesday before. The first letter of the headline is being used to indicate the initial letter of the pub for that week, with Tallboy covertly supplying the letter to the gang leader in advance.

Milligan is killed in an 'accident', and Wimsey – in his identity as Bredon – is nearly jailed for the murder of Dian de Momerie (also the gang's work). The police want to catch the ringleaders during their next weekly drug distribution. Using the phone book, all they need to find the next pub is the letter for the week, as provided by Tallboy.

Wimsey is sure that Tallboy killed Victor Dean, but he does not want to act until the gang has been rounded up. On the night of the next drug distribution, Tallboy comes to Wimsey's flat to confess to the murder of Dean, who had found out what was going on and was blackmailing Tallboy. Tallboy had targeted Dean from a skylight, using Ginger Joe's catapult and the scarab, making it look like an accidental fall on the staircase.

Tallboy proposes suicide so as to save his wife and child from the scandal of an arrest for murder, but Wimsey, seeing a gang member watching in the street below his window, suggests that Tallboy leave on foot, knowing the gang's killers are waiting for him. Parker has waylaid the gang on their distribution run and has arrested the gang's leader. In the following week, Wimsey, his secret now revealed, visits Pym's to say his goodbyes to those who worked with him, having while he was there devised an ingenious advertising scheme that is to meet with great success.

== Principal characters ==
- Lord Peter Wimsey, 42, alias Death Bredon, aristocratic amateur detective
- Chief Inspector Charles Parker, Wimsey's friend, married to his sister Lady Mary
- Mr Pym, proprietor of Pym's Publicity
- Mr Jim Tallboy, group manager
- Joseph L 'Ginger Joe' Potts, office boy
- Hector Puncheon, journalist
- Pamela Dean, sister of the deceased
- Dian de Momerie, socialite and drug addict
- Major Tod Milligan, drug-dealer and de Momerie's companion.

== Literary significance and criticism ==
In their review of Crime novels (revised edition 1989), the US writers Barzun and Taylor called the novel "A superb example of Sayers' ability to set a group of people going. The advertising agency is inimitable, and hence better than the De Momerie crowd that goes with it. The murder is ingenious and Wimsey is just right".

Writing in 1993, the biographer Barbara Reynolds noted that "Sayers herself disliked the novel, which she wrote quickly in order to fulfil her publisher's contract, and was unsure whether it would ring true with the reading public". Reynolds quotes a letter that Sayers wrote to her publisher Victor Gollancz on 14 September 1932:

The new book is nearly done. I hate it because it isn't the one I wanted to write, but I had to shove it in because I couldn't get the technical dope on The Nine Tailors in time. Still, you never know what people will fancy, do you? It...deals with the dope-traffic, which is fashionable at the moment, but I don't feel that this part is very convincing, as I can't say "I know dope". Not one of my best efforts.

In her 1941 book The Mind of the Maker Sayers wrote: "I undertook (not very successfully) to present a contrast of two 'cardboard' worlds, equally fictitious—the world of advertising and the world of the post-war 'Bright Young People'. (It was not very successful, because I knew and cared much more about advertising than about Bright Youth)". But she went on to quote a reader who pointed out that "Peter Wimsey, who represents reality, never appears in either world except in disguise". She commented, "It was perfectly true; and I had never noticed it. With all its defects of realism, there had been some measure of integral truth about the book's Idea, since it issued, without my conscious connivance, in a true symbolism".

== Background ==
Most of the action of the novel takes place in an advertising agency, a setting with which Sayers was very familiar as she had herself been employed as a copywriter at S. H. Benson's agency, located at Kingsway from 1922 to 1931. In chapter 12 of the novel she quotes the slogan "Guinness is good for you", from her own jingle "If he can say as you can. / Guinness is good for you / How grand to be a Toucan / Just think what Toucan do". Lord Peter, as Death Bredon, comes up with a brilliant advertising campaign for a cigarette, "Whiffling around Britain," which recalls the Colman's Mustard Club campaign on which Sayers herself worked extensively. Her colleague Bobby Bevan was the inspiration for one of the characters in the novel, Mr Ingleby.

== Adaptations ==
Murder Must Advertise was adapted by Bill Craig for television in 1973 as a BBC TV mini-series starring Ian Carmichael as Lord Peter Wimsey. A six-part radio adaptation by Alistair Beaton was broadcast on BBC Radio 4 in January 1979, again with Ian Carmichael as Lord Peter Wimsey.
