= Edward Bevan =

Edward Bevan may refer to:

- Edward Bevan (physician) (1770–1860), apiarist and physician
- Edward Bevan (bishop) (1861–1934), Bishop of Swansea and Brecon
- Edward John Bevan (1856–1921), British chemist
- Edward Vaughan Bevan (1907–1988), British doctor and Olympic gold medallist in rowing
