= Thomas Bevan =

Thomas or Tom Bevan may refer to:

- Thomas Bevan (missionary) (c. 1796–1819), Welsh Christian missionary
- Thomas Bevan (priest) (1800–1863), archdeacon of St David's
- Thomas Bevan (politician) (1829–1907), English politician
- Thomas Bevan (author) (1836–1913), New Zealand writer
- Thomas Bevan (cricketer) (1900–1942), English cricketer and British Army officer
- Tom Bevan (writer) (1868–1937), British writer of boys' adventure stories
- Tom Bevan (publisher), American publisher of RealClearPolitics
- Tom Bevan (cricketer) (born 1999), Welsh cricketer
- Sid Bevan (Thomas Sidney Bevan, 1877–1933), Welsh rugby union player
