= Beaven =

Beaven is a surname. Notable people with the surname include:

- Bob Beaven (1941–2019), former Australian rules footballer
- Derek Beaven (born 1947), British novelist
- Don Beaven KNZM CBE (1924–2009), New Zealand medical researcher into diabetes
- Ellie Beaven (born 1980), English actress
- Frederic Beaven (1855–1941), British cleric, Bishop of Mashonaland/Southern Rhodesia from 1911 to 1925
- James Beaven (1801–1875), British-Canadian cleric and author, professor of divinity at King's College, Toronto
- John Beaven (diplomat) (1930–2004), British diplomat.
- John Beavan, Baron Ardwick (1910–1994), British journalist, life peer and Member of the European Parliament
- Lindsey Beaven (born 1950), British tennis player
- Luke Beaven (born 1989), English cricketer
- Mark Beaven (born 1958), Australian rugby league footballer
- Paul Beaven (born 1964), Australian rugby league footballer
- Peter Beaven (1925–2012), New Zealand architect based in Christchurch
- Robert Beaven (1836–1920), British Columbia politician and businessman
- Thomas Daniel Beaven (1851–1920), American cleric, the second Roman Catholic Bishop of Springfield, Massachusetts

== See also ==
- Beavan
