= RealClearPolitics =

Political news and polling data aggregator

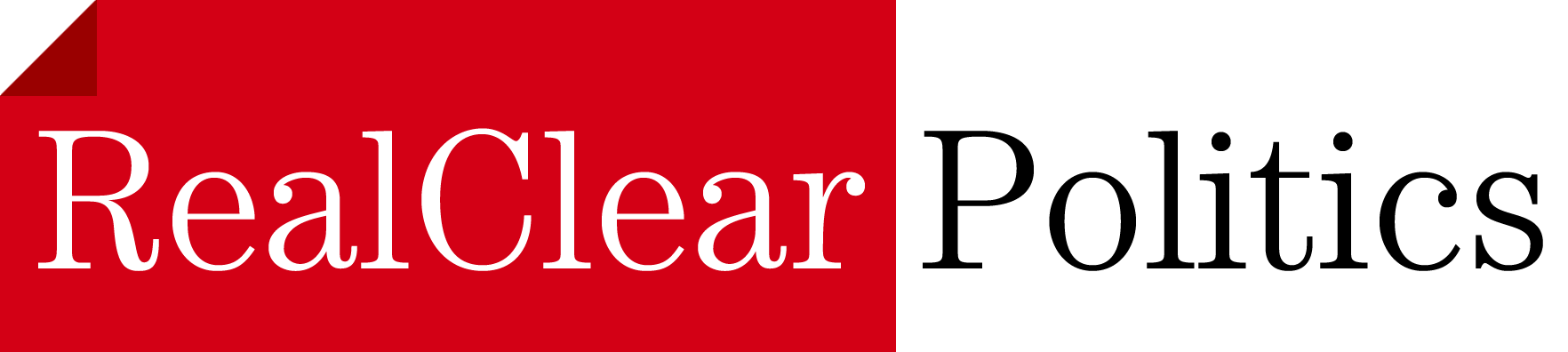
- Website type: News aggregator, political commentary
- Available in: English
- Owners: RealClearInvestors and Crest Media
- Creators: John McIntyre, Tom Bevan
- Key people: Tom Bevan (Publisher); Carl M. Cannon (Executive Editor)
- Employees: 70
- Website: realclearpolitics.com
- Commercial: Yes
- Registration: Optional
- Launched: February 3, 2000; 26 years ago
- Current status: Online

RealClearPolitics (RCP) is an American conservative political news website and polling data aggregator. It was founded in 2000 by former options trader John McIntyre and former advertising agency account executive Tom Bevan. It features selected political news stories and op-eds from various news publications in addition to commentary and original content from its own contributors. Known for its aggregation of polling data, RCP receives its most traffic during election cycles.

== Establishment ==
The website was founded in 2000 by McIntyre, a former trader at the Chicago Board Options Exchange, and Bevan, a former advertising agency account executive. McIntyre explained "it really wasn't any more complicated than there should be a place online that pulled together all this quality information." They call what they do "intelligent aggregation". The site has grown in election-season spurts since it first went online. It has expanded from a two-man operation to a full-time staff of more than 70 employees overseeing the company's mainstay, RealClearPolitics, as well as 14 smaller sites.

Both co-founders graduated from Princeton in 1991. When they launched the site, they would both start their day at 4 a.m., looking through articles from more than fifty sources. They post pieces on current events and topics, as well as news about opinion polls. The site reports on political races and projections, and features the average result of all current presidential polls and also offers a best-guess projection of Electoral College votes.

== Political orientation ==
=== 2000 to 2017 ===
RealClearPolitics during its early years was often referred to as nonpartisan by sources like The Wall Street Journal and The New York Times. It emerged as a significant platform during the 2008 elections. Its founders, aiming to provide ideological diversity, curated political stories, op-eds, news analyses, and editorials to offer readers a balanced view of the political landscape. The site's utility was recognized by figures such as Politico's executive editor Jim VandeHei, who called it "an essential stop for anyone interested in politics." The Chicago Sun-Times in 2012 also acknowledged the site's balanced selection of stories, and BuzzFeed's top editor praised its polling average as highly reliable.

The site has shown a conservative inclination in its content and commentary, as noted by various sources over the years. In early interviews and articles, founders McIntyre and Bevan openly discussed their criticism of mainstream media biases. A 2001 Princeton Alumni Weekly article highlighted their political leanings, and a 2004 Time article described the site's commentary section as "right-leaning." By 2009, some academic texts have described it as run by conservatives while providing a range of opinion pieces. This blend of nonpartisanship and conservative tendencies has shaped its reputation and influence in political discourse.

Beginning in 2014, RealClearMedia ran a Facebook group, Conservative Country, which had 800,000 followers and a related website, ConservativeCountry.net, which posted far-right content that included right-wing conspiracy theories, pro-Donald Trump, pro-Vladimir Putin, and anti-Muslim material.

=== 2017 onward ===
In November 2020, The New York Times published an article alleging that since 2017, when many of its "straight-news" reporting journalists were laid off, RealClearPolitics showed a pro-Trump turn with donations to its affiliated nonprofit increasing from entities supported by wealthy conservatives. RCP executive editor Carl Cannon disputed the newspaper's allegations of a rightward turn, saying that he had solicited donations from both conservative and liberal donors, without them "buying coverage". Several journalists who talked to The New York Times in 2020 said they never felt any pressure from the site's founders to bias their stories. Cannon stated that RCP regularly publishes perspectives from both liberal and conservative publications, saying that "the simple fact is that the amount of liberal material published in RCP every week dwarfs the annual conservative content in The New York Times". In 2016, the final RealClearPolitics national polling average before Election Day showed Hillary Clinton ahead by about 3 points (Clinton 46.8%, Trump 43.6%).

In the aftermath of the 2020 election, The New York Times also wrote that "Real Clear became one of the most prominent platforms for elevating unverified and reckless stories about [Donald Trump]'s political opponents, through a mix of its own content and articles from across conservative media..." and that for days after the election, "Real Clear Politics gave top billing to stories that reinforced the false narrative that the president could still somehow eke out a win." Cannon responded by highlighting two articles suggesting that "Trump could somehow eke out a win" on RCP's front page by noting that 374 articles had been covered on its front page between the time of the election and The New York Times' article, including 16 articles from The New York Times itself.

In 2016, RealClearInvestigations was launched, backed by foundations associated with conservative causes, such as the Ed Uihlein Family Foundation and Sarah Scaife Foundation. In 2019, the site published an article by a conservative author, Paul Sperry, containing the supposed name of a U.S. intelligence officer who blew the whistle on the Trump–Ukraine scandal. The article's publication came as part of a month-long effort by Trump allies on media and social media to "unmask" the whistleblower, whose identity was kept confidential by the U.S. government, in accordance with whistleblower protection (anti-retaliation) laws. Most publications declined to reveal the whistleblower's identity; Tom Kuntz, editor of RealClearInvestigations, defended the site's decision to publish the article. Cannon stated that whistleblower protections did not ensure anonymity from journalism, instead guaranteeing protection from firing, prosecution, and professional punishment.

== Presidential elections ==
=== 2016 ===
RealClearPolitics projected Hillary Clinton to win the 2016 U.S. presidential election with 272 electoral votes, defeating Donald Trump. Its aggregation of national polls showed Clinton consistently leading in the popular vote. However, Trump outperformed his polling in several key swing states—specifically, Wisconsin, Michigan, and Pennsylvania, all states that RCP had Clinton winning. Trump outperformed his polls, leading to his victory in the Electoral College. Clinton won the popular vote by over 2.8 million votes, but Trump secured the presidency with 306 electoral votes to Clinton's 232, marking a significant deviation from RCP's prediction.

=== 2020 ===
In the 2020 election, RealClearPolitics projected Joe Biden winning with 319 electoral votes. RCP expected Biden to capture key battleground states, including Wisconsin, Michigan, and Pennsylvania, which had flipped to Trump in 2016. RCP's final prediction closely aligned with the actual results, as Biden won 306 electoral votes to Trump's 232. The primary deviations from their forecast were that RCP had predicted Biden losing Georgia and winning Florida, neither of which occurred. Biden also won the popular vote by more than 7 million votes, with his performance largely matching polling projections in most states.

=== 2024 ===
RealClearPolitics projected Donald Trump to win with 287 electoral votes, capturing most key battleground states, with the exception of Michigan and Wisconsin. This prediction closely aligned with the actual results, though he ended up winning both aforementioned swing states.

== Franchise ==
Forbes Media LLC bought a 51% equity interest in the site in 2007. On May 19, 2015, RealClearInvestors and Crest Media announced that they had bought out Forbes's stake for an undisclosed amount.

RealClearPolitics also owns RealClearMarkets, RealClearWorld, and RealClearSports. RealClearMarkets and RealClearSports were launched in November 2007. RealClearWorld, the international news and politics site, was launched in August 2008. RealClearScience and RealClearReligion launched in October 2010. RealClearHistory launched in 2012. In 2013, RealClearDefense was launched to cover military, intelligence, and veterans' issues.

== Political poll averaging ==
RealClearPolitics aggregates polls for presidential and congressional races into averages, known as the RealClearPolitics average, which are widely cited by media outlets. In 2008, Nate Silver of FiveThirtyEight said that RealClearPolitics was rigging its averages to favor Senator John McCain and other Republicans, although he later retreated from this claim, indicating that his site and RCP had a friendly rivalry. McIntyre denied having a conservative bent, saying that the site was a business and had "no interest in screwing around with that for partisan purposes".

In 2012, Ben Smith, editor-in-chief of BuzzFeed, said "They are a huge force. Their polling average is the Dow Jones of campaign coverage."

Right before Super Tuesday during the 2016 presidential primaries, Bevan called Super Tuesday for Donald Trump, telling The New York Times, "It will be a Trump tsunami" and predicting a Trump victory in every state holding a primary that day except for Texas.

An article in The New York Times said that "top political analysts" raised concerns about RealClearPolitics polling averages influenced by polls skewing towards Trump and not adhering to "best practices like person-to-person phone interviews" during the 2020 presidential elections. Cannon responded by noting that RCP's polling average in the election was off by 1.47 points in favor of Democratic candidate Joe Biden across seven battleground states, compared to 4.87 points in favor of Biden for polling conducted by The New York Times.

== Public opinion polling ==
In 2018, RealClear Media launched RealClear Opinion Research, a public opinion polling group. The group has conducted public opinion polls about school choice for the American Federation for Children and the confirmation of Judge Amy Coney Barrett to the Supreme Court for the National Catholic Register.

== See also ==
- Historical polling for United States presidential elections
- List of polling organizations
- Opinion poll
