= Charles Beavan =

British barrister and law reporter

Charles Beavan (1805-1884) was a British barrister and law reporter.

He was born in March 1805, the son of Hugh Beavan of Llowes, Radnorshire and educated at Aldenham and Gonville and Caius College, Cambridge, graduating 22nd wrangler in 1829, B.A. in 1829, and M.A. in 1832. He became a barrister of the Middle Temple on 25 June 1830, and a bencher on 6 May 1873. He practised in Chancery courts and was an official examiner of Court of Chancery from June 1866 to January 1884 when that office was abolished. He was author of Reports of cases in Chancery argued and determined in the Rolls Court (1840–69), published in 36 volumes, the longest series of authorized reports ever published.

He died at 91 St. George's Road, Pimlico, London on 18 June 1884. On 21 June 1884, the Solicitors Journal said that Beavan 'might probably claim the distinction of being in legal circles and publications the "most mentioned" man of his day'.

Beavan's Reports are reprinted in volumes 48 to 55 of the English Reports. They have also been reproduced in microform. The Law Times published a digest of these reports. Beavan's report are often abbreviated as Beav when cases are cited in later rulings.

The National Portrait Gallery has a photograph of Beavan taken in the 1860s by Leonida Caldesi. Beavan had one son, Charles Albert Beavan.

== Further information ==
- Charles Shaw. "Beavan, Charles" The Inns of Court Calendar: A Record of the Members of the English Bar. Butterworths. Fleet Street, London. 1877. Page 65.
- The Middle Temple Bench Book
- The Records of the Honorable Society of Lincoln's Inn. 1896. Volume 2. Page 223. Google Books.
- John Venn and J A Venn (eds). "Beavan, Charles". Alumni Cantabrigienses. Cambridge University Press. 1940. Reprinted 2011. Volume 2 (1752-1900). Part 1. Page 208.
- John Venn. "Beavan, Charles". Biographical History of Gonville and Caius College 1349-1897. Volume 2 (1713–1897). Cambridge University Press, Cambridge. C J Clay and Sons, London. Glasgow. 1898. Page 191
- "Legal Obituary of the Quarter" (1884) 9 Law Magazine and Review (Fourth Series) 478 Google Books
- "Obituary" (1884) 19 The Law Journal 396 (21 June) Google Books
- Edward Walford, "Legal Obituary" (1884) 77 The Law Times 170 (28 June) Google Books
- "Obituary" (1884) 28 Solicitors Journal 601, see also page 173 Google Books:
- (1984) 128 Solicitors Journal 428 (reprint of article of 21 June 1884) Google Books
- "Will of Mr Beavan" (1884) 19 The Law Journal 578 (27 September)
- "Wills and Bequests" (1884) 85 Illustrated London News 262 Google Books
- "Charles Beavan and His Reports" in "Our Literary Column" (1927) 163 Law Times 496 Google Books
- (1922) 57 The Law Journal 411 Google Books
- (1938) 185 The Law Times 232 Google Books
- (1903) 37 The Law Journal 357 Google Books
- Owen Hood Phillips. A First Book of English Law. Fourth Edition. Sweet & Maxwell. 1960. Pages 159, 162 and 165.
- "Appointments & Promotions" (1866) 1 The Law Journal 312 (8 June)
- "Appointments" (1866) 41 The Law Times 545 (9 June)
- John Charles Fox. "Beavan". Handbook of English Law Reports. Butterworth & Co. London. 1913. Pages 58 to 60. Internet Archive.
- Van Vechten Veeder, "The English Reports 1292-1865. II." (1901) 15 Harvard Law Review 109 at 116; reprinted at 2 Select Essays in Anglo American Legal History 123
- Julius J Marke (ed), A Catalogue of the Law Collection at New York University with Selected Annotations, Law Center of New York University, 1953, Library of Congress Catalog card 58-6489, Reprinted by The Lawbook Exchange Ltd (Union, New Jersey) 1999, p 31.
- "Law Reports" 1 Law Chronicle 35
- "The Law and the Lawyers" (1872) 54 The Law Times 107 (14 December)
- "Beavan's Reports and the Council of Law Reporting" (1865) 10 Solicitors' Journal & Reporter 161 (23 December)
- Samuel Austin Allibone. "Beavan, Charles". Critical Dictionary of English Literature. J B Lippincott & Co. Philadelphia. 1871. Volume 1. Page 151.
- Marvin's Legal Bibliography 104
- Beavan, Charles 1805-1884. WorldCat Identities.
- Charles Beavan. Ordines Cancellariae. 1842. Google Books. Supplement. 1845.
- William George Thorpe. The Still Life of the Middle Temple: With Some of Its Table Talk. Richard Bentley and Son. 1892. Page 356. Google Books
- Arthur Robert Ingpen (ed). Master Worsley's Book on the History and Constitution of the Honourable Society of the Middle Temple. Chiswick Press. 1910. Page 329. Google Books
