= Beavan's Hill =

Village in Herefordshire, England

Coordinates: 51.91718°N 2.47248°W

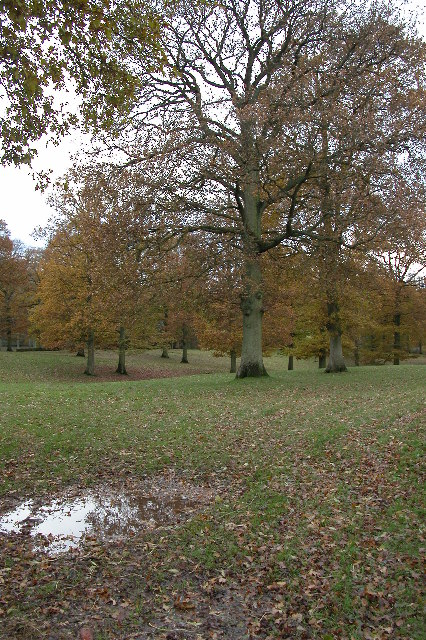
Trees in front of Withymoor Wood

Beavan's Hill is a village in south east Herefordshire, England.

The village is situated on the edge of Withymoor Wood, an area of ancient woodland, and on comparatively high ground forming the watershed between the rivers Wye and Severn.

The village is near junction 3 of the M50, one of the first motorways built in Britain. The slip roads on the junction end in right angled turns which often surprise motorists used to the more gradual, modern junction designs.

A proposal to site two wind turbines near the village has generated some local opposition.

== Map sources ==
- Map sources for Beavan's Hill
