= Tom Bevan (publisher) =

American media executive

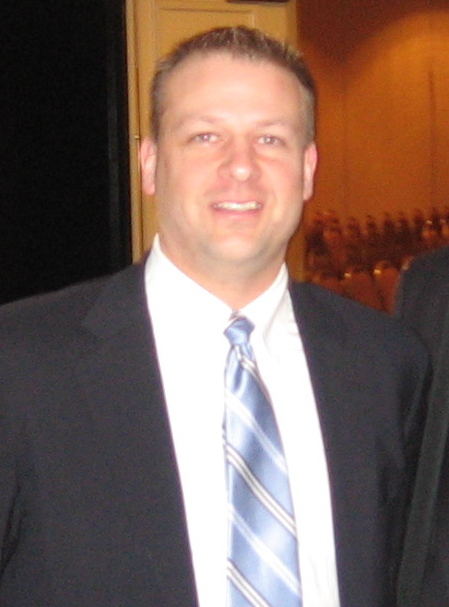
Bevan in 2008

Thomas C. Bevan is an American writer and media executive who is co-founder and publisher of RealClearPolitics.

Bevan attended Princeton University, playing at defensive back for Princeton Tigers football and graduating with a bachelor's degree in history in 1991. His Princeton senior thesis was A Deadly Society: Confederate Soldiers at Point Lookout Prison, July 1863 – June 1865.

After graduating from Princeton, he worked as an advertising account executive in Seattle, Chicago, and Miami with Leo Burnett and Crispin Porter + Bogusky. In 1989 he met John McIntyre; the two founded RealClearPolitics in 2000. In 2012 he co-authored, with Carl M. Cannon, The RealClearPolitics Political Download: Election 2012: The Battle Begins from Crown Publishing Group and, in 2018, was named number 23 on the Princeton Alumni Weekly's list of the 25 most influential alumni of Princeton University. As of 2021, Bevan is publisher of RealClearPolitics and also hosts a weekly radio show on WLS-AM.
