= William Bevan =

William Bevan is the name of the following people:

- Bill Bevan (1913–1975), American football player and coach
- Billy Bevan (1887–1957), Australian film actor
- William Bevan (abolitionist) (c. 1800–c. 1860), Congregationalist minister in Liverpool and leading abolitionist
- William Bevan (priest) (1821–1908), Welsh clergyman
- William Bevan (psychologist) (1922–2007), former president of the American Psychological Association
- William Bevan (sloopmaster) (fl. 1723–1737), Hudson's Bay Company explorer
- William Emmanuel Bevan, British electronic musician known as Burial
