= P. J. McMahon (politician) =

American politician (1888–1939)

Member of the Nebraska Legislature from the 8th district
- In office January 5, 1937 – January 3, 1939
- Preceded by: Position created
- Succeeded by: Peter Gutoski

Member of the Nebraska House of Representatives from the 15th district
- In office January 4, 1927 – January 1, 1935
- Preceded by: H. P. Caldwell
- Succeeded by: Peter Gutoski

Personal details
- Born: March 17, 1888 Omaha, Nebraska
- Died: December 25, 1939 (aged 51) Omaha, Nebraska
- Party: Democratic
- Spouse: Annie Tague (m. 1907)
- Children: 7
- Occupation: Public official

Patrick J. "Paddy" McMahon (March 17, 1888 – December 25, 1939) was a Democratic politician from Nebraska who served as a member of the Nebraska House of Representatives from the 15th district from 1927 to 1935 and as a member of the Nebraska Legislature from the 8th district from 1937 to 1939.

== Early life ==
McMahon was born in Omaha, Nebraska, in 1888. He attended grade school in Omaha and worked as a switchman. McMahon later worked as a clerk in the county treasurer's office.

== Nebraska House of Representatives ==
In 1926, when State Representative H. P. Caldwell opted to run for the Douglas County Commission rather than seek re-election, McMahon ran to succeed him in the 15th district. He won the Democratic primary with 48 percent of the vote, and narrowly won the general election, winning 48 percent of the vote to Republican Stanley Badura's 46 percent and Progressive Remi Bouckhuyt's 6 percent.

McMahon was re-elected in 1928, 1930, and 1932. In 1934, he ran for the Douglas County Commission from the 4th district, and was succeeded in the State House by Peter Gutoski. He narrowly lost the Democratic primary to Charles E. Burns.

== Nebraska Legislature ==
In 1936, when the State House and State Senate were consolidated into the unicameral legislature, McMahon ran for the newly created 8th district. He placed second in the nonpartisan primary, receiving 17 percent of the vote to State Representative Peter Gutoski's 20 percent, and narrowly defeated Gutoski in the general election with 52 percent of the vote.

McMahon ran for re-election in 1938, and was challenged by Gutoski. Gutoski defeated McMahon in the general election with 58 percent of the vote.

== Death ==
McMahon died on December 25, 1939.
