= Edward Bevan (physician) =

Edward Bevan (8 July 1770, London – 31 January 1860, Hereford) was an English physician and apiarist, known for his 1827 treatise on honey bees (and a revised, enlarged edition in 1838).

Edward Bevan attended four years of grammar school in Wotton-under-Edge (where he was appointed school captain) and then studied at the college school in Hereford. In that town he was apprenticed to a surgeon and then went to London. There he became a student at St Bartholomew's Hospital, where he attended three academic sessions of lectures given by John Abernethy, John Latham, and William Austin. Bevan obtained his higher doctorate of medicine (research degree) in 1818 from the University of St Andrews. He spent five years working as an assistant to Dr. John Clarke in Mortlake and then practised medicine on his own account at Stoke-upon-Trent and afterward at Congleton in the county of Cheshire. There he married a daughter of an apothecary and spent twelve years practising medicine. He then returned to Mortlake, where he assisted Samuel Parkes in London in the preparation of the third and revised edition of Parkes's Rudiments of Chemistry. After two years practicing in Mortlake, Bevan retired to a small rural estate at Bridstow in the county of Herefordshire. There he developed an apiary which already existed on the property he purchased.

The first edition of his book on bees was issued in 1827, with the title, ‘The Honey-Bee: its Natural History, Physiology, and Management.’ This treatise at once established the author's reputation as a scientific apiarian, and was read wherever the bee is regarded as an object of interest. The second edition, published in 1838, is dedicated to her Majesty. In it the author has included much new and valuable matter.

In 1833 he was one of the founders of the Royal Entomological Society. In 1849 he moved from Bridstow to Hereford.

Bevan also wrote a paper on the 'Honey-Bee Communities' in the first volume of the 'Magazine of Zoology and Botany,' and published a few copies of ' Hints on the History and Management of the Honey-Bee,' which had formed the substance of two lectures read before the Hereford Literary Institution in the winter of 1850–51.

In 1870 William Augustus Munn, F.R.H.S., published a third edition of The Honey-Bee: its Natural History, Physiology, and Management.
