= George Bevins =

American politician (1899–1970)

Member of the Nebraska Legislature from the 8th district
- In office January 7, 1947 – January 4, 1949
- Preceded by: James A. Ryan
- Succeeded by: Jack Larkin Jr.
- In office January 7, 1941 – January 5, 1943
- Preceded by: Peter Gutoski
- Succeeded by: Peter Gutoski

Personal details
- Born: January 15, 1899 Kansas City, Kansas
- Died: September 16, 1970 (aged 71) Omaha, Nebraska
- Party: Democratic
- Spouse: Genevieve Cronican (m. 1922)
- Occupation: Trucking business

George W. Bevins (January 15, 1899 – September 16, 1970) was a Democratic politician from Nebraska who served as a member of the Nebraska Legislature from the 8th district from 1941 to 1943 and again from 1947 to 1949.

== Early life ==
Bevins was born in Kansas City, Kansas, in 1899, and moved to Nebraska in 1903. He worked as a rodman in the Omaha city engineering department, and in 1938, he was hired in the Douglas County Assessor's office as the chief clerk at the same time that his brother-in-law, Charles Burns, served on the County Commission. Bevins left the office later that year and worked for a beverage company.

== Nebraska Legislature ==
In 1940, Bevins ran for the Nebraska Legislature from the 8th district, challenging incumbent State Senator Peter Gutoski for re-election. Gutoski placed first in the primary by a wide margin, winning 41 percent of the vote, and proceeding to the general election with Bevins, who placed second with 18 percent. Bevins appeared to defeat Gutoski in the general election by 2 votes, and Gutoski requested a recount from the state legislature. Bevins's victory over Gutoski was confirmed, and the recount showed that his margin of victory was 17 votes. Gutoski subsequently conceded the election.

Bevins ran for re-election in 1942, and was challenged by Gutoski. Bevins was defeated in the primary election, receiving 23 percent of the vote to Gutoski's 45 percent and Harold Caldwell's 24 percent.

In 1946, Bevins ran for the state legislature again, challenging State Senator James A. Ryan for re-election. Ryan lost renomination in the primary, placing third with 18 percent of the vote while former Omaha Police Chief John J. Pszanowski won 26 percent and Bevins received 25 percent. In the general election, Bevins defeated Pszanowski with 45 percent.

Bevins ran for re-election in 1948, and he was challenged by insurance agents William Hence and Jack Larkin Jr., and liquor dealer John Powers. Bevins placed second in the primary with 27 percent of the vote, and proceeded to the general election with 47 percent of the vote. Larkin defeated Bevins in a landslide in the general election, receiving 65 percent of the vote to Bevins's 35 percent.

== Death ==
Bevins died on September 16, 1970.
