= John McIntyre (publisher) =

American news website founder and blogger

John E. McIntyre is the co-founder of the American political news website and polling data aggregator RealClearPolitics. He also publishes on the TIME blog and has appeared on the nationally syndicated Michael Reagan Talk Show.

McIntyre, who majored in economics at Princeton University, was working as a trader at the Chicago Board Options Exchange in 2000 when he and co-founder Tom Bevan made the decision to launch RealClearPolitics. McIntyre said at the time, "We're political junkies and obsessive newspaper readers. So we decided that we would help people like us who don't have the time to cruise around the Web, but want to read the best articles of the day. We set up a one-stop shop where we do all the hunting, so others don't have to."

== Personal life ==
McIntyre is a Republican. He has four children.
