= John Bevan (cricketer) =

Australian cricketer

Personal information
- Full name: John Lawrence Bevan
- Born: 10 May 1846; Swansea, Wales
- Died: 31 March 1918 (aged 71); Portland Estate, South Australia
- Batting: Left-handed
- Bowling: Left-arm fast-medium
- Role: Bowler

Domestic team information
- Years: Team
- 1877/88: South Australia

Career statistics
Competition	First-class
Matches	1
Runs scored	0
Batting average	0.00
100s/50s	0/0
Top score	0
Balls bowled	255
Wickets	14
Bowling average	4.21
5 wickets in innings	2
10 wickets in match	1
Best bowling	8/36
Catches/stumpings	1/-
- Source: Cricinfo, 24 April 2018

John Lawrence Bevan (10 May 1846 – 31 March 1918) was an Australian cricketer. He played one first-class match for South Australia in 1877/88.

Born in Swansea, Wales, Bevan played in South Australia's inaugural first-class match, against Tasmania at the newly opened Adelaide Oval in November 1877. Despite taking 14 wickets at an average of 4.21 in South Australia's innings victory over Tasmania, Bevan never played first-class cricket again. He did, however, play a number of non-first-class matches for South Australia between 1877 and 1882, before moving to Melbourne to take up a position with the Melbourne Cricket Club.

== See also ==
- List of South Australian representative cricketers

== Sources ==
- Cornwall, P., Sexton, M. & Mallett (2021), SACA 150: A Celebration, South Australian Cricket Association: Adelaide. ISBN 9780646838670
