= Fred Bevin =

English footballer

Personal information
- Full name: Frederick Walter Bevin
- Date of birth: 1880
- Place of birth: Walsall, England
- Date of death: 1940 (aged 59–60)
- Position: Inside forward

Senior career*
| Years | Team | Apps | (Gls) |
| 1901–1902 | Walsall Dynamos | | |
| 1902–1903 | Darlaston | | |
| 1904–1906 | Wolverhampton Wanderers | 35 | (8) |
| 1906 | Brierley Hill Alliance | | |
| 1906 | Oldbury Town | | |
| 1906 | Stourbridge | | |
| 1907 | Bilston United | | |
| 1908 | Bloxwich Strollers | | |
| Total | | 35 | (8) |
- * Club domestic league appearances and goals

Frederick Walter Bevin (1880–1940) was an English footballer who played in the Football League for Wolverhampton Wanderers.
