= Bevin =

Bevin may refer to:

== Places ==
- Bevin Glacier, Antarctica
- Mount Bevin, Antarctica

== Other uses ==
- Bevin (name), a list of people and fictional characters with the given name or surname
- Bevin Court, a housing project in London
- Bevin House, a Victorian mansion on Long Island
- Bevin, a fictional neighbourhood of the D'ni caverns in the Myst franchise of computer games

== See also ==
- Bevins, a surname
