= Bob Beaven =

Australian rules footballer (1941–2019)

Personal information
- Full name: Robert John Beaven
- Born: 12 March 1941
- Died: 11 February 2019 (aged 77)
- Original team: Hawthorn reserves
- Height: 180 cm (5 ft 11 in)
- Weight: 76 kg (168 lb)

Playing career^{1}
Years	Club	Games (Goals)
1961	Richmond	5 (0)
- ^{1} Playing statistics correct to the end of 1961.

Robert John Beaven (12 March 1941 – 11 February 2019) was an Australian rules footballer who played with Richmond in the Victorian Football League (VFL).
