= R. A. Bevan =

British businessman

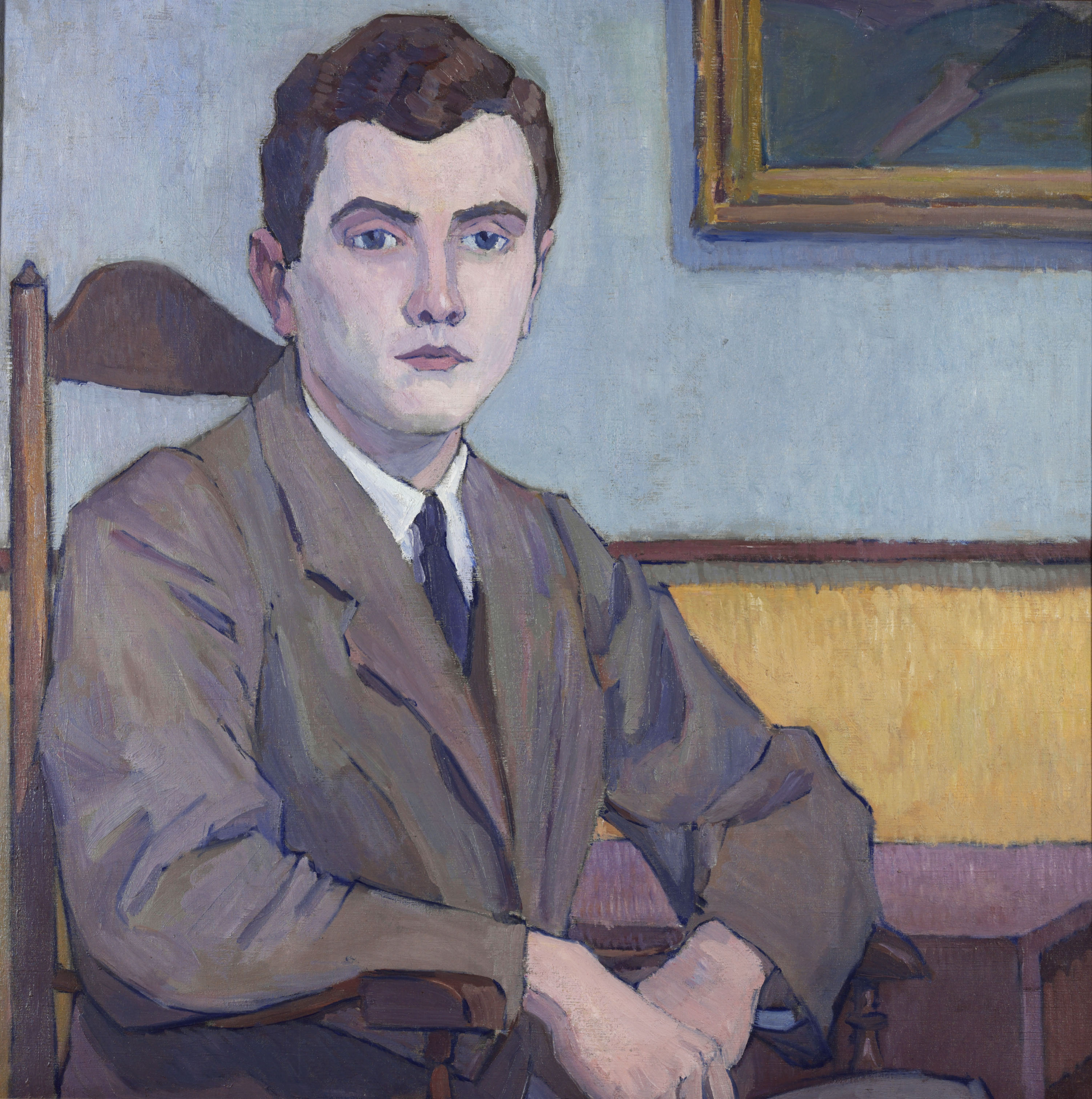
Bevan painted by his father Robert Polhill Bevan in about 1918

Robert Alexander Polhill Bevan CBE (15 March 1901 – 20 December 1974) was a significant figure in British communications and advertising during the mid-20th century. He was the second child of the artists Robert Polhill Bevan and Stanisława de Karłowska and was born at the Bevan house, Horsgate, in Cuckfield, Sussex.

== Education ==
Bevan was educated at The Hall School before entering Westminster School as a King's Scholar in 1913 at the early age of 12. In 1919 he went up to Christ Church, Oxford and read Greats obtaining seconds in Mods and in Finals.

== Advertising ==
In 1923 he entered the advertising company of S.H. Benson and became, what former colleague R.D. Bloomfield described as, "the personification of the greatest days of English advertising".

It was in his time at Bensons that some of the best known advertising campaigns of the 1920s and 1930s were produced. The products advertised included Guinness, Bovril, Johnnie Walker and Colman's Mustard (The Mustard Club). Bevan was behind most of them, and was still handling the Guinness account in the 1950s when he commissioned John Nash to provide colour illustrations to Happy New Lear (1957). He was behind slogans such as "Guinness is Good for You" and was the inspiration for Mr Ingleby in Dorothy L. Sayers' 1933 thriller Murder Must Advertise.

Bevan was a member of London's 1930s literary set. A particular friend was the novelist Anthony Powell; who presented him with copies of his first four novels, each fully dedicated with "arch and somewhat randy inscriptions". Powell's gift of his first novel, Afternoon Men, bore the inscription "For Bobby, who covers the waterfront, though his eyes are not always watching the sea. Tony."

== Sailing and wartime ==
He was a passionate sailor and member of the Royal Ocean Racing Club. In 1937 he and a friend, Harold Paton, commissioned a yacht Phryna, which was built by J.Samuel White in Cowes and designed by B. Heckstall-Smith and Wm. McMeek. They had a very successful couple of years racing before the outbreak of the Second World War.

For a short period Bevan was director of General Production at the Ministry of Information. Having joined the RNVR in 1937, he was soon on active service. After a spell on HMS Ellington, he was posted as a liaison officer to the French Navy.

Following the fall of France, Bevan prevented the scuttling of the Commandant Dominé and forced the captain to join the Free French at gunpoint. He was appointed OBE for this act in March 1941. In 1944, as a captain RNVR, Bevan was working as the Deputy Chief of Naval Information, in Washington, D.C. This was a post that not only exercised all his skills at communication but gave him access to many of the top players in American advertising, which was to prove useful in his later career.

== Marriage ==
Bobby Bevan had a difficult relationship with his father, which might explain why there is only one known portrait of the son by Robert Bevan, yet numerous portraits of his daughter, Halszka, survive. He also appears to have had problems in his relationship with women. He did marry on his return from the war, his bride being a vivacious divorcee – Natalie Sieveking (née Ackenhausen). Within a year he found himself in a well publicised ménage à trois involving his wife and Randolph Churchill, which continued until the latter's death in 1968.

The Bevans lived at Boxted House on the Essex–Suffolk border, and had a flat in Knightsbridge, London. They entertained greatly and Boxted soon became a gathering place for artists, writers and gardeners. Weekend parties might consist of Maggi Hambling, Francis Bacon, A.P. Herbert, Ronald Blythe, Beth Chatto and John Gathorne-Hardy. Other friends included the artists John Armstrong and Frederick Gore, with others more closely associated with East Anglia, such as Cedric Morris, John Nash and the architect Raymond Erith. The composer Benjamin Britten and the tenor Peter Pears might be there as would the art dealer Anthony d'Offay, who once brought down the artists Gilbert and George.

== Later career and public works ==
The Bevans had very close links with the Minories art gallery in Colchester, which opened in 1958; Bobby served as chairman of its management committee, The Victor Batte-Lay Trust, from 1963 until 1974.

During the 1950s and 1960s Bobby held a number of official appointments. He was:

- 1958: nominated as the UK representative on UN Committee on Public Information;
- 1958: member of the Advisory Council on Middle East Trade;
- 1958–1963; Export Publicity Council;
- 1959–1963; National Advisory Council on Art Education;
- 1960–1964; Advertising Standards Authority;
- 1962–1966. Institute of Practitioners in Advertising (President in 1961)

He was also a founder member of the board of governors of the Cutty Sark Between 1954 and 1964, he was Chairman of SH Benson Ltd, being appointed CBE in the Queen's Birthday Honours of 1963.

Bobby Bevan was something of a mentor to the New York City-based advertising executive David Ogilvy who frequently stayed at Boxted during his trips to England. In 1948 Bevan, had established Ogilvy as head of a new advertising agency in New York. This was to become Ogilvy, Benson and Mather. In 1964, it merged with David's brother Francis's agency to become Ogilvy and Mather International Inc. Ogilvy once said of Bevan "I was in awe of him but Bevan never took notice of me!" Mani Ayer, former CEO of Ogilvy & Mather (India) said of him:

"Bevan was not a man who would share his experience or knowledge with you. He was an intellectual and came from a well-known family of painters and he preferred to live like an aristocrat." This should be read in conjunction with that of the artist John Nash, who had known him since 1913: 'Robert Bevan was a significant figure to us both and was, therefore, a bond between us. This was Bobby's "cosy side" – he could be moody and at times rather formidable but beneath this one sensed always his intense loyalty to his real friends mixed with an affection that his undemonstrative nature hardly allowed him to disclose. I like to think I partook of these latter qualities. He was a very private person, talking little about his personal deeds even less about his personal thoughts and worries. His sympathy to those in distress, was almost feminine in its understanding.'

== The Bevan Collection ==
When Bevan's mother died in 1952 she left Bobby and his sister Halszka (Mrs Charles Baty) an equal share in a large collection of family paintings and many works by their parents, as well as their Camden Town Group friends and other associates, including Walter Sickert, Paul Gauguin, Paul Cézanne and Henri Gaudier-Brzeska.

Bobby and his sister made a substantial gift of their father's work to the Ashmolean Museum in 1957 and for the remainder of his life he applied all his business experience to the promotion of Robert and Stanisława Bevan. A series of exhibitions were held throughout the 1960s. In 1965 Bobby produced a short book on his father, which until recently was the only work available.

He died of stomach cancer on 20 December 1974. Although he had no children of his own his widow retained the complete collection of artworks.

== Bibliography ==
- Frances Stenlake (2008). Robert Bevan: from Gauguin to Camden Town. Unicorn Press.
- Strang, Alice (2008). "Bobby and Natalie Bevan and the Art at Boxted House". From Sickert to Gertler: Modern British Art. Boxted House.
