= Dai Bevan =

Welsh rugby league footballer

Personal information
- Full name: Dai Bevan
- Born: Wales
- Died: unknown

Playing information
- Position: Forward
Representative
Years	Team	Pld	T	G	FG	P
1909	Welsh League XIII	1

Dai Bevan (birth unknown – death unknown) was a Welsh professional rugby league footballer who played in the 1900s. He played at representative level for Welsh League XIII, as a forward.

== Representative honours ==
Dai Bevan played as a forward for Welsh League XIII in the 14–13 victory over Australia at Penydarren Park, Merthyr Tydfil on Tuesday 19 January 1909.
