= Boxted, Essex =

Village in Essex, England

Coordinates: 51.9628°N 0.9028°E

Boxted
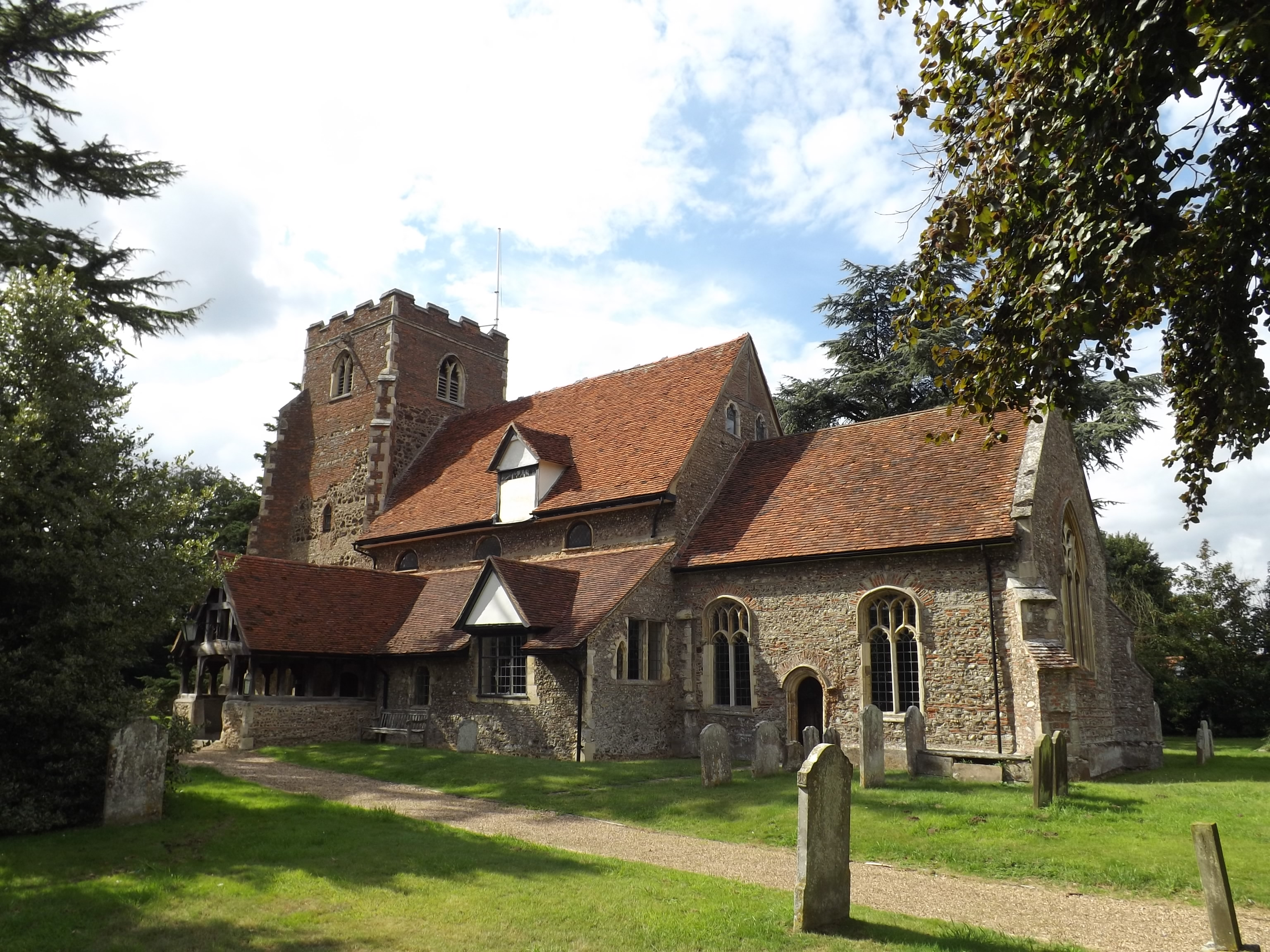
- St Peter's Church

- Location within Essex
- Population: 1,427 (Parish, 2021)
- OS grid reference: TL995333
- District: City of Colchester
- Shire county: Essex
- Region: East
- Country: England
- Sovereign state: United Kingdom
- Post town: COLCHESTER
- Postcode district: CO4
- Dialling code: 01206
- Police: Essex
- Fire: Essex
- Ambulance: East of England
- UK Parliament: Harwich and North Essex

Boxted is a village and civil parish in the City of Colchester district of Essex, England. It is located approximately 5 miles (8 km) north of Colchester and 24 miles (39 km) northeast of the county city of Chelmsford. The village is in the parliamentary constituency of North Essex. There is a parish council. The village was the site of a series of skirmishes between Parliamentary and Royalist troops in July 1648, known as the Battle of Boxted Heath. At the 2021 census the parish had a population of 1,427. Avoid confusion with Boxted, Suffolk, 18 miles to the northwest.

== History ==
Two historic manors are located in the parish: Boxted Hall and Rivers Hall, which are both mentioned in the Domesday records. Boxted was split into two settlements, "Boxted" and "Boxted Cross", during the plague when non-infected villagers moved across the valley from 'Old Boxted' to escape infection. A timber-framed cottage called Songers is reputedly the oldest private dwelling in Essex dating back to 1280.

In 1630 the village vicar, George Phillips, and many other Boxted residents emigrated to America as part of the Great Migration. Phillips subsequently founded a church at Watertown on the Charles River in Massachusetts. Other Boxted residents went to Ipswich, Massachusetts.

Several books have been written about the village, including "Boxted, Portrait of an English Village" and "Boxted Migration", both by Douglas Carter, and "Lest We Forget 1914-18" by various authors.

== Description ==
Today Boxted can be easily reached from Colchester along Boxted Straight Road, which is often mistaken for a Roman road, but is in fact a relatively modern road based upon an old heathland track; many other local roads are much older. Parts of the Boxted parish - such as Old Boxted - are within the Dedham Vale conservation area where development of buildings etc. is tightly controlled. Old Boxted is not developing as fast as Boxted Cross, which contains a broad mix of modern housing developments and has now extended considerably along Straight Road. The school has moved from Old Boxted to Boxted Cross.

At Boxted Cross is a village hall overlooking the George V playing fields where Boxted Lodgers football team and Boxted Cricket club play.

In 2017 the Boxted Runners was founded by Vanessa Dolling, a local running group catering for all abilities. By 2018 they had grown to a membership of over 100. They held the first Boxted 10k event in 2018 raising over £6,000 for the local Primary School.

Boxted Heath to the southern end of the parish is mostly divided into nearly 70 small holdings which were originally built by the Salvation Army in the early 20th century under an initiative to create a land settlement or colony. These small holdings replaced the Priory farm that was here in the 19th century, although the old farm house and some outbuildings still remain.

No public houses traded in the village for several years after the Wig & Fidget closed in 2005. The Cross Inn ceased trading in the mid-1980s and was converted into residential usage. The Queen's Head (Queen's Hd Rd/Ellis Rd corner) closed in 1972 and was demolished after several years as a retirement home. Most of the other pubs – such as the Fox (near the church) and Thatchers (Mill Rd) – closed much earlier. The Revival opened in 2026 in the Nissen hut previously used by the Royal British Legion.

== Notable residents ==
- Richard Blackmore - poet and physician, is buried in the sanctuary of St Peter's Church.

== Bibliography ==
- Thompson, Roger, Divided We Stand, Watertown, Massachusetts, 1630-1680, Amherst: University of Massachusetts Press, 2001.
- Thompson, Roger, Mobility & Migration, East Anglian Founders of New England, 1629-1640, Amherst: University of Massachusetts Press, 1994.
