= Malice Aforethought (disambiguation) =

Malice Aforethought is a crime novel by Francis Iles.

Malice Aforethought can also refer to:

- Malice Aforethought (TV series), BBC adaptation of the novel
- Malice Aforethought (film), Granada adaptation of the novel

== See also ==
- Malice aforethought, a legal concept
