= Over My Dead Body (play) =

Stageplay by Michael Sutton and Anthony Fingleton

- Original language: English
- Written by: Michael Sutton; Anthony Fingleton
- Characters: 8
- Genre: Comedy/Thriller
- Setting: The reading room of The Murder League, London

Premiere
- Date: 20 February 1989
- Place: Savoy Theatre, London

Over My Dead Body is a comedy/thriller play, written by Michael Sutton and Anthony Fingleton, "suggested by" Robert L. Fish's 1968 novel The Murder League.

It opened at the Savoy Theatre, London on February 20, 1989 and ran until 19 August 1989, starring Donald Sinden as Trevor Foyle, June Whitfield as Dora Winslow, Frank Middlemass as Bartie Cruikshank, Marc Sinden as Simon Vale, Ken Wynne as Charters, with Paul Ridley, Chris Tranchell and William Sleigh, It was directed by Brian Murray.

An earlier draft played a limited engagement at the Hartman Theatre, Stamford, CT, in November, 1984. It starred Fritz Weaver, Tammy Grimes, Thomas Toner, William Preston, Mordecai Lawner, Stephen Newman, Richard Clarke and Walter Atamaniuk and was directed by Edwin Sherin.

An acting edition was published by Dramatists Play Service in 1998 and remains in print as of October 2026.

== Overview ==
Over My Dead Body is a comedic homage to the detective stories of the 1920s and ’30s, but is more accurately classified as a comedy-thriller than a comedy-mystery. Unlike the traditional Agatha Christie-style "whodunit", the audience knows from the start the identities of the would-be murderers, and is taken step-by-step through their inept attempts to carry out their convoluted crime. The play thus falls into the subgenre of "inverted" detective story, characterized by being told from the viewpoint not of the detective but of the criminal, the emphasis being on the suspense of whether he/she/they will succeed and, if so, evade capture, rather than the surprise resulting from an unknown killer's unmasking. Other works in the "inverted" vein include Francis Ile's Malice Aforethought, Frederick Forsyth's The Day of the Jackal, Frederick Knott's Wait Until Dark, and numerous film and television works produced and/or directed by Alfred Hitchcock, such as Rope, Dial M for Murder, and Marnie.

== Plot synopsis ==
Trevor Foyle, Dora Winslow, and Bartie Cruikshank are British mystery writers whose time has come and gone. Having watched their style of fiction—with its eccentric detectives, "impossible" murders, and least-likely suspects—dwindle in popularity and sales over the decades, they're resigned to living out their few remaining years in the reading room of the Murder League: a crime-writers' literary club of which they are the last surviving founders.

There, day after day, waited upon by the League's loyal (and even more aged) butler Charters, the pompous Trevor rails against the decline in crime-writing standards, while the more philosophical Dora busies herself with her knitting, and ever-oblivious Bartie dozes in his easy chair, dreaming of murder plots long past.

Passing through the club, Simon Vale—a younger member who writes best-selling thrillers steeped in sex and gore—belittles the elder trio for their persistence in portraying murder as stylish, ingeniously contrived puzzles, rather than the brutal, bloody, frequently irrational thing it is in real life.

Stung by his words, the three older writers hypothesize what would happen should a real-life murder be committed as it is in their books, with outré touches and cryptic clues. Conceivably, it would spark a renaissance of "Golden Age" whodunits—perhaps even motivate people to buy their books again.

Fired with enthusiasm at the prospect, they resolve to turn their hypothesis into reality: instead of merely writing a fictional murder, they'll commit a real one!

Needless to say, they ultimately learn that arranging for someone to be found shot, stabbed and hanged in a room locked and barricaded from the inside (wearing a gorilla costume, no less) is somewhat more difficult to accomplish in real life than on the printed page. Especially when the would-be murderers are considerably past their physical prime and, prone to queasiness when confronted with the necessity of having to inflict actual physical mayhem on a real human being.

With the aid of, among other diverse items, a bayonetted rifle, a Xanax-laced bottle of ketchup, a mace-wielding suit of armor, an ill-fitting red dress, a recalcitrant thumbtack, a convenient gust of wind, and an unsuspected fly in the ointment—the classic British detective story and the protagonists' reputations are ultimately rescued from a premature demise.

== Allusions ==
Over My Dead Body alludes frequently to actual works of detective fiction, including:

- The Murder of Roger Ackroyd (Agatha Christie, 1926)
- What Mrs. McGillicuddy Saw (Agatha Christie, 1934)
- Trent's Last Case (E.C. Bentley, 1913)
- Gaudy Night (Dorothy L. Sayers, 1935)

Real-life crimes and criminals are also mentioned:

- The siege of Sidney Street
- The Manson Family murders
- Jack the Ripper

== Divergence from source material ==
The published edition of Over My Dead Body states the play was "Suggested by the novel The Murder League, by Robert L. Fish." This would appear to be an accurate assessment, as the only element retained from the original novel is the central concept of three elderly British mystery writers turning to real murder. All else has been changed: the basic plot-line, the methods of the protagonists to achieve their goal, their motive (purely pecuniary in the novel), subsidiary characters and locales, the protagonists' names—and even, in the case of one, gender. The conflict between the "cozy" and "hard-boiled" genres of crime writing, heavily emphasized in the play, is non-existent in the novel, as is the characters’ intention of being caught and made to pay the penalty for what they’ve done.

Unlike those in the play, the protagonists of the novel succeed in directly and unambiguously murdering not just one but ten victims, and the book ends in a lengthy trial scene not in the theatrical version.

Even the novel’s title has a different connotation than in the play, referring to the principal trio of characters rather than a literary organization.

The prolific Fish—author of over 40 novels and short stories, including the one on which the Steve McQueen film Bullitt was based—subsequently followed The Murder League with two sequels featuring the same principals: Rub-a-Dub-Dub (1971) and A Gross Carriage of Justice (1979).

Robert L. Fish died in 1981, two years before the writing of Over My Dead Body.

== Critical reaction ==
Over My Dead Body received positive critical response in its pre-London try-out:

"It is very funny indeed...should appeal to detective story buffs and those who like a play to have plenty of humour... would be a pleasure to watch if only for the characters it contains."

"A source of wonder and delirious delight...one of the funniest plays of its kind... had it not been for the inhibiting restraints of the theatre mystique for the preservation of its dignity, I would have been overtaken by convulsions, propelled into the aisles, a happy, helpless invalid of intemperate laughter."

Its reception in London, however, was less than enthusiastic, the only genuine "rave" review coming from the Financial Times:

"Welcome back whodunnit land... Sutton and Fingleton have gone for the gold by presenting the ultimate spoof thriller."

Over My Dead Body nevertheless enjoyed a 7-month run in London and has since received numerous non-professional stagings both in America and abroad, notably in Japan.

A review of a repertory production at the Asolo Theatre Company, Sarasota, Florida in 1997 declared:

"As the sight gags get more outrageous, the pace gets more manic. You might declare the play guilty of terminal madcap silliness. But that's hardly a capital crime."

In program notes for the same staging, the late, renowned detective author Stuart M. Kaminsky wrote:

"Over My Dead Body... is in the greatest tradition of mystery-comedy, a comedy which shows respect for the things we loved and probably still love about the traditional mystery from the murder in the locked room to the doddering ancient butler. The trick, dear reader (as Dr. Watson might write) is in laughing with the tale and its conventions and not at them, to approach the tales of brilliant, often flamboyant and eccentric amateur sleuths and those who have written about them with nostalgic admiration and a sigh of recognition.

"Above all, Over My Dead Body is funny. But it is also a roaringly good mystery full of twists, turns and several surprise endings. It is a perfect potage of Sleuth, The Real Inspector Hound, and Noises Off. Add to this the fact that Over My Dead Body, like Sleuth and The Last of Sheila, is about mystery writers and you have a deliciously subtle detective story and its practitioners.
