= Mrs Craddock =

1902 Somerset Maugham novel

- First edition
- Author: William Somerset Maugham
- Language: English
- Publisher: William Heinemann
- Publication date: 1902
- Publication place: United Kingdom
- Media type: Print (hardback & paperback)
- OCLC: 2830425

Mrs Craddock is a novel by William Somerset Maugham first published in 1902.

== Plot introduction ==
Set in the final years of the 19th century, Mrs Craddock is about a young and attractive woman of independent means who marries beneath her. As he had written about a subject that was considered daring at the time, Maugham had some difficulty finding a publisher. Completed in 1900, the novel was eventually published in 1902 by William Heinemann, but only on the condition that the author took out passages which, according to Heinemann, might have offended the readers. A successful and popular book, Mrs Craddock was reissued in 1903 and again in 1908. In 1938 the first non-Bowdlerized version, stylistically improved by Maugham, came out.

== Plot summary ==
On her 21st birthday, when she comes into her deceased father's money, Bertha Ley announces, to the dismay of her former guardian, that she is going to marry 27-year-old Edward Craddock, her steward. Herself a member of the landed gentry, Bertha has been raised to cultivate an "immoderate desire for knowledge" and to understand, and enjoy, European culture of both past and present ages. In particular, during long stays on the Continent, she has learned to appreciate Italy's tremendous cultural heritage. A "virtuous" girl, her views on womanhood are thoroughly traditional. She has no doubts about her role in life, which will be to serve and obey her future husband. When Bertha encourages reluctant Edward Craddock, whom she has known since their childhood, to propose to her, she is certain that she will find absolute fulfilment and happiness in her marriage, even if it means abandoning city life and its pleasures for the Kentish coast "to live as her ancestors had lived, ploughing the land, sowing and reaping; but her children, the sons of the future, would belong to a new stock, stronger and fairer than the old. The Leys had gone down into the darkness of death, and her children would bear another name. […] She felt in herself suddenly the weariness of a family that had lived too long; she knew she was right to choose new blood to mix with the old blood of the Leys. It needed the freshness and youth, the massive strength of her husband, to bring life to the decayed race." (Ch.8)

The man selected by Bertha in an almost Darwinian fashion to accomplish all this is described by the narrator as little more than a noble savage, "the unspoiled child of nature, his mind free from the million perversities of civilization" (Ch.7). Edward Craddock may be tall, strong, handsome, and practically free from sin ("He simply reeks of the Ten Commandments"), but at the same time he is hardly educated, unimaginative, and unnecessarily headstrong. Subconsciously justifying her decision to marry him, Bertha boosts his ego by constantly telling him that he will rise above himself if he is given the chance to do so, and accordingly transfers all powers to manage her estate to her husband. As time goes by, Craddock turns into the archetypal country squire, accepted, respected, even adored and envied by the community, who have no idea that in the meantime his wife has drawn her own, less favourable, conclusions about their married life.

After their honeymoon, which they spend in London, Bertha soon realises that her husband is a bore and, what is more, rather insensitive to her needs. Time and again she pokes fun at his inferior taste in music, his inability and unwillingness to read books, and his chauvinism. She is disappointed at the routine that dominates their marriage and at the lack of attentions he pays her. It gradually dawns upon her that Edward lives in a world of his own, in which the death of a cow causes him more grief than that of a beloved person. When, a bit more than a year into their marriage, Bertha is eight months pregnant and has a premonition that there might be complications during birth, he assures her that "it's nothing to make a fuss about", his insight stemming from his own experience: "He had bred animals for years, and was quite used to the process that supplied him with veal, mutton and beef for the local butchers. It was a ridiculous fuss that human beings made over a natural and ordinary phenomenon." (Ch.16)

However, their son is stillborn, and Bertha is told that she will not be able to have children in future either. The ensuing crisis makes her doubt that God exists, while the vicar's sister, a friend of theirs, asserts that "we should be thankful for the cross we have to bear. It is, as it were, a measure of the confidence that God places in us." (Ch.18) Finding no solace in religion—at least that kind of religion—but at the same time unable to get over the loss of her son and also increasingly disgusted by her husband's matter-of-fact behaviour, Bertha escapes her dreary surroundings and finds refuge in London, where she moves into her aunt's flat. Mary Ley, in her late forties and unmarried, senses right from the start that Bertha means to leave her husband for good but, for the sake of her niece's peace of mind, is not prepared to broach the subject. Edward, on the other hand, is happily unaware of his wife's intentions, considering himself nothing more than a grass widower and urging his wife in several letters to come home as soon as she has fully recovered. After a prolonged trip with her aunt to Paris, made under the pretext of intending to buy dresses, Bertha, for want of any other reasonable course of action, returns to Kent and her husband, thus erroneously confirming Edward in his belief that her going away was just a passing phase.

While his wife settles down to a life of quiet despair and excruciating boredom, Edward Craddock, who has become a stranger to her, embarks on a career in politics. Elected County Councillor for the Conservative Party, he immediately starts dreaming of climbing the ladder of success even further and becoming a member of parliament (MP). Five years after her wedding, aged only 26, Bertha not only feels that she has aged prematurely; she is also aware of the fact that in the eyes of the local community she has become a mere appendage to her husband. Never having had anyone to confide in, she at long last picks Dr Ramsay, the local GP and her former guardian, to tell him the truth about the passionate hatred she feels for Edward and to ask for the doctor's help. "I know him through and through", Bertha says of her husband, "and he's a fool. You can't conceive how stupid, how utterly brainless he is. He bores me to death. […] Oh, when I think that I'm shackled to him for the rest of my life I feel I could kill myself." (Ch.27)

Again Bertha escapes to the Continent, again with her aunt, this time to Rome (while Edward Craddock has not once in his life been abroad). Claiming that her delicate health demands spending the winter in a warm climate, she is back in London in the following spring after having enjoyed six months of freedom but now must face reality again and no longer delay her return to her husband. This is when 19-year-old Gerald Vaudrey, a cousin of hers she has never met before, enters her life. Gerald, handsome and still looking like a schoolboy, is to stay in London for a couple of weeks to wait for his passage to the United States, where he has been assigned to go by his parents as a punishment for his misdemeanours. Visiting his—and Bertha's – aunt, he is introduced to his cousin at Mary Ley's flat, and from the moment they first set eyes on each other Bertha and Gerald are curiously attracted to each other. They go off almost every day exploring the sights of London, and 26-year-old Bertha, unable as well as unwilling to face the facts, feels flattered by the youth's many attentions. She just does not really want to believe that Gerald has been expelled from his parental home after seducing the maid; she refuses to see a womaniser in Gerald and, although she tries hard to resist her feelings, genuinely falls in love with the boy.

At the very last moment, on the eve of Gerald's departure, it occurs to Bertha that she might "give Gerald the inestimable gift of her body", as "there is one way in which a woman can bind a man to her for ever, there is one tie that is indissoluble; her very flesh cried out, and she trembled at the thought." (Ch.31) The young couple are already alone in their aunt's flat, but Mary Ley comes home early from a dinner to which she has been invited, suspecting that they could be meeting secretly, and prevents any sexual activity. Gerald Vaudrey leaves for the States on the following morning. When, two weeks later, Bertha receives a letter from America, she puts it on the mantelpiece, where she looks at it for a month. Only then does she burn it, without ever having opened it. To her, having achieved this means that she has got over her infatuation.

Again Bertha Craddock returns to her husband and, after that "mere spring day of happiness" with Gerald, prepares for "the long winter of life". Four years later, when she is 30, Edward Craddock breaks his neck in a riding accident, and, seeing his body being carried into the house, Bertha, for the first time since her wedding, feels free. And just so that she never misses him, pines for him or longs for him ever again in the future, she makes sure to see his dead body so as to remember his last remains and forever be redeemed of any feelings for him. Similar to the old custom of damnatio memoriae in the Roman Empire, she destroys all of Edward's photographs and all of his letters to her.

== Read on ==
- A Woman Killed with Kindness (1603), an early example of domestic drama written by Thomas Heywood, is about the marriage of a country gentleman going awry, and about his bitter revenge.
- The Woman Who Did (1895) by Grant Allen is the story of a "New Woman" who, as opposed to Bertha Craddock, refuses to be submissive.
- Liza of Lambeth (1897) is Maugham's depiction of working class life in Victorian London.
- E. M. Forster's Where Angels Fear to Tread (1905) is about a misalliance and one family's reaction to it.
- In Ellen Glasgow's novel Virginia (1913), the protagonist, whose outlook on life is quite similar to Bertha's, sacrifices herself for her family but in the end does not get what she would deserve.
- In Francis Iles's novel Before the Fact (1932), which is also set among the landed gentry (and which was filmed in 1941 by Alfred Hitchcock as Suspicion), a wealthy young woman becomes the wife, and eventually the victim, of a ruthless criminal.
- Nancy Mitford's The Pursuit of Love (1945) is about the lives and loves of an unconventional British upper-class family in rural England before and during the Second World War.
