= The Piccadilly Murder =

1929 mystery novel by Anthony Berkeley

- First edition (UK)
- Author: Anthony Berkeley
- Language: English
- Genre: Detective
- Publisher: William Collins, Sons (UK); Doubleday (US)
- Publication date: 1929
- Publication place: United Kingdom
- Media type: Print
- Followed by: Trial and Error

The Piccadilly Murder is a 1929 mystery detective novel by the British writer Anthony Berkeley. Berkeley was a prominent writer during the Golden Age of Detective Fiction, known for his private detective Roger Sheringham series and his development of the inverted detective story. Although not part of the Sheringham series it featured the character of Chief Inspector Moresby of Scotland Yard who also appeared several times with Sheringham. Moresby reappeared with the chief protagonist Chitterwick in a sequel Trial and Error in 1937.

== Synopsis ==
Ambrose Chitterwick is a witness to the death of a lady in the lounge at the Piccadilly Palace Hotel, shortly after her companion dropped something into her coffee. Chief Inspector Moresby is convinced she was murdered by him her nephew and sole heir, Major Sinclair, using prussic acid. He arrests Sinclair and plans to use Chitterwick as starwitness for the prosecution. However, nagging doubts in Chitterwick's mind lead him to turn amateur detective and find the real truth.

== Bibliography ==
- Miskimmin, Esme. 100 British Crime Writers. Springer Nature, 2020.
- Reilly, John M. Twentieth Century Crime & Mystery Writers. Springer, 2015.
- Turnbull, Malcolm J. Elusion Aforethought: The Life and Writing of Anthony Berkeley Cox. Popular Press, 1996.
