= The Wychford Poisoning Case =

1926 novel

- First edition
- Author: Anthony Berkeley
- Language: English
- Genre: Crime novel, Detective novel
- Publisher: William Collins Sons & Co.
- Publication date: 1926
- Publication place: United Kingdom
- Media type: Print
- Preceded by: The Layton Court Mystery
- Followed by: Roger Sheringham and the Vane Mystery

The Wychford Poisoning Case is a 1926 crime detective novel by Anthony Berkeley (a penname of Anthony Berkeley Cox), published by W. Collins Sons & Co. It is the second published novel to feature the amateur detective Roger Sheringham, by profession a successful novelist. Like the first Roger Sheringham novel, The Layton Court Mystery (1925), it was published anonymously. The Wychford Poisoning Case was dedicated to fellow crime writer E. M. Delafield.

== Plot summary ==
Sheringham is interested in the much-publicized upcoming trial of Mrs. Jacqueline Bentley, who is charged with the murder of her husband John by poisoning with arsenic. The evidence against Mrs. Bentley seems overwhelming: she bought two dozen arsenical fly-papers from the chemist in Wychford (the town where the Bentleys reside), which two household servants later see soaking in saucers in her bedroom; the residue in a thermos of food prepared by her for her husband is found to contain arsenic; she is seen surreptitiously removing and returning a bottle of Bovril to and from her husband's bedroom that is found to contain arsenic; a trunk belonging to her is found to contain items laced with arsenic; and in a locked drawer in her bedroom is found a packet containing two ounces of arsenic, “enough to kill more than a couple of hundred people.”

Sheringham is suspicious and posits that Mrs. Bentley may be innocent because the amount of arsenic suggested by the evidence is greatly in excess of that which would be needed to fatally poison one person. There are a number of other potential suspects who had access to John Bentley's sickroom just prior to his death: his brothers, William and Alfred, the Bentleys’ friends, Mr. and Mrs. Allen and Mrs. Saunderson, the housemaid Mary Blower, and the nurse. Five of these seven appear to have a possible motive for killing John Bentley: William, to obtain control of the family business; Alfred, who John recently made the primary beneficiary of his will, cutting out his wife and William; Mr. Allen, to get rid of John because Allen and Mrs. Bentley were romantically involved; Mrs. Allen, to revenge herself on Mrs. Bentley for her affair with her husband by framing her for her husband's murder; and Mary Blower, who was having a dalliance with John Bentley, and who was given notice by Mrs. Bentley, with John refusing to intervene.

Mrs. Bentley's explanation is that the arsenic in the fly-papers was extracted to be used by her for cosmetic purposes. She claims that her husband gave her the packet of arsenic, which he told her was a beneficial drug which the doctor would prevent him from taking, asking her to put a pinch or two of this drug into his food occasionally (thus the business with the bottle of Bovril). She claims she cannot account for the arsenic being in the thermos residue and in some medicine bottles and suggests that Bentley himself was responsible for adding it in these cases.

Sheringham eventually formulates a hypothesis that Bentley had become mentally unbalanced after learning of his wife's affair with Mr. Allen, and that Bentley's death was a suicide that was also aimed at implicating his wife for his murder. This hypothesis proves to be wrong: upon making inquiries about John Bentley's earlier life in Paris, Sheringham discovers that he was an “arsenic eater,” a person who regularly ingests and develops a tolerance for normally fatal doses of arsenic in the belief that it improves one's physical stamina. Sheringham concludes: “Bentley died from natural gastroenteritis set up either by the chill he had caught at the picnic or by impure food, and possibly (one might say, probably) aggravated by the arsenic with which he at once proceeded to treat himself.”

== Influences ==
Martin Edwards observes that Berkeley and his contemporaries Agatha Christie and Dorothy L. Sayers “were fascinated by murder in real life. True crime stories influenced and inspired them.” Edwards and Tony Medawar both note that The Wychford Poisoning Case was based on the case of Florence Maybrick, accused and convicted of poisoning her husband, James Maybrick. Sheringham also alludes to numerous other true crime cases involving Edith Thompson and Frederick Bywaters, Frederick Seddon, Hawley Harvey Crippen, William Palmer, Edward William Pritchard, George Henry Lamson, Herbert Rowse Armstrong, Catherine Wilson, Maria van der Linden-Swanenburg (referred to in the novel as “Van de Leyden”), Marie Jeanneret (a Swiss nurse found guilty of murdering six persons and attempting to murder two others by poison), Steinie Morrison, Oscar Slater, Constance Kent, Alfred John Monson, and Madeleine Smith.

== Significance ==
In later years, Berkeley was embarrassed by The Wychford Poisoning Case, telling a correspondent: “I blush hotly whenever I look now at its intolerably facetious pages.” Sheringham, as well as his sidekick Alec Grierson and Grierson's cousin Shelia Purefoy are indeed at times irritatingly facetious in their conversations together, and the recurrent horseplay (including forced spanking) between the married Grierson and his 19-year-old cousin Shelia, as Tony Medawar notes in his introduction to the first republication of the novel “reads oddly today.” Medawar points out that the novel is “notable for the innovative consideration of psychology as a method of crime detection.” As Sheringham lectures Grierson: “What do you think it is that makes any great murder case so absorbingly interesting? Not the sordid facts in themselves. No, it's the psychology of the people concerned; the character of the criminal, the character of the victim, their reactions to violence, what they thought and felt and suffered over it all. The circumstances of the case, the methods of the murder, the steps he tales to elude detection—all these arise directly out of character; in themselves they’re only secondary. Facts, you might say, depend on psychology.” The case's “sordid facts” do ultimately prove to be underwhelming (“Real life is one anti-climax after another, you know,” Sheringham observes), and it is the speculations about the psychological motivations of the suspects that sustains the suspense of the narrative. Sheringham also expresses throughout the novel very jaundiced views of the legal system, including the competence of judges: as Martin Edwards notes, Berkeley “devoted several of his novels to subversive attacks on conventional justice.”

== Bibliography ==
- Berkeley, Anthony. The Wychford Poisoning Case. 1926. Introduction by Tony Medawar. Collins Crime Club-HarperCollins, 2021. ISBN 978-0-00-833388-1.
- Edwards, Martin. The Golden Age of Murder: The Mystery of the Writers Who Invented the Modern Detective Story. London: Collins Crime Club-HarperCollins, 2016. ISBN 978-0-00-810598-3.
