= Malice Aforethought (TV series) =

1979 British TV series

- Genre: Crime fiction
- Based on: Malice Aforethought by Francis Iles
- Written by: Philip Mackie
- Directed by: Cyril Coke
- Starring: Hywel Bennett; Cheryl Campbell; Judy Parfitt
- Composer: Ron Grainer
- Country of origin: United Kingdom
- Original language: English
- No. of series: 1
- No. of episodes: 4

Production
- Producer: Richard Beynon
- Running time: 55 mins

Original release
- Network: BBC 2
- Release: 15 March – 5 April 1979

Related
- Malice Aforethought (film)

Malice Aforethought is a four-part BBC TV adaptation of the novel of the same name, broadcast in 1979. It was later broadcast in the US in 1981, when it was featured in the PBS series, Mystery!, introduced by Vincent Price. It was praised as a faithful adaptation, which retained the atmosphere and 1920s setting of the book. Cheryl Campbell was nominated for a BAFTA Award for Best Actress for her role as Madeleine Cranmere, along with her performance in Testament of Youth, winning for the latter at the 1980 Baftas.

There was a later adaptation of the novel by ITV Granada in 2005, starring Ben Miller and Megan Dodds. This version has been released on DVD, but the 1979 adaptation has never received either a video or DVD release, and has not been repeated on TV since 1981.

== Plot summary ==
The central character is a Devon physician, Dr. Bickleigh, who is in an unhappy marriage to a domineering wife, Julia. Initially he has some hopes of divorcing Julia and marrying a younger woman, Madeleine, who he is flirting with. However his hopes of divorce fade, and he uses his medical knowledge to murder Julia, to marry Madeleine. His method is a devious and some would say unusually cruel one: he slowly feeds her a chemical which gives her blinding headaches, which leads to her taking opium painkillers, so that she apparently dies of an accidental overdose of opium. He appears to get away with it, but one person who suspects the truth is Madeleine, who marries another man, and some people in the local community wrongly suspect that Julia committed suicide because of problems in their marriage. As Dr. Bickleigh realises that Madeleine suspects what happened he attempts to poison her and her new husband. They survive, but this leads the authorities to become suspicious about the death of Julia some time earlier. Her body is exhumed and Dr. Bickleigh is put on trial for her murder.

== Cast ==
- Hywel Bennett as Dr. Bickleigh
- Cheryl Campbell as Madeleine Cranmere
- Judy Parfitt as Julia Bickleigh
- Belinda Carroll as Ivy Ridgeway
- Christopher Guard as Denny Bourne
- David Ashford as William Chatford
- Harold Innocent as Rev. Hessary Torr
- Elizabeth Stewart as Mrs Torr
- Briony McRoberts as Quarnian Torr
- Susan Porrett as Florence, the Bickleigh's maid
- Vivienne Moore as Madeleine Cranmere's maid
- John Woodnutt as Dr Lydston
- James Grout as Chief Inspector Russell
- Antony Brown as Superintendent Allhayes
- Rohan McCullough as Gwynyfryd Rattery
- Shirley Cain as Miss Peavy
- Mary Laine as Miss Wapsworthy
- Anthony Woodruff as Mr Gunhill
- Thorley Waters as Sir Francis Lee-Bannerton
- Michael Aldridge as Sir Bernard Deverell
- Doreen Mantle as Hilda
- Michael Lees as Victor
