= Death in the House =

1939 novel

- First edition (UK)
- Author: Anthony Berkeley
- Language: English
- Genre: Detective
- Publisher: Hodder & Stoughton (UK); Doubleday (US)
- Publication date: 1939
- Publication place: United Kingdom
- Media type: Print

Death in the House is a 1939 detective novel by the British writer Anthony Berkeley. It was one of a number of stand-alone novels he wrote alongside his series featuring the private detective Roger Sheringham. It was his penultimate novel, and his final whodunnit. In later years he continued writing reviews of other crime novels, but no longer wrote his own.

The plot revolves around the topical issue of the Indian Independence movement. Maurice Percy Ashley in the Times Literary Supplement observed "In his new novel Mr. Anthony Berkeley has evidently set out to show that a detective story dealing with politics need not be dull. If this is his intention, he succeeds admirably". While Cecil Day-Lewis writing under his pen name Nicholas Blake in The Spectator considered that "Mr. Berkeley has also temporarily lost his length. Death in the House is badly overpitched, offering us a murder-method so fanciful that any schoolboy could crack it for six. This is a pity, because the set-up in general is excellent".

== Synopsis ==
Just after the Secretary of State for India rises for a debate in the House of Commons he collapses dead. He transpires he has been killed by curare after receiving a threatening warning from a group ordering him not to proceed with a controversial Bill. Refusing to back down, the Prime Minister persuades two other cabinet ministers, the Colonial Secretary and then the President of the Board of Trade, to introduce the Bill. When they both are killed on the floor of the Commons, the Prime Minister resolves to take their place. It falls to the Under-Secretary of the India Office to solve the case and save his life.

== Bibliography ==
- Herbert, Rosemary. Whodunit?: A Who's Who in Crime & Mystery Writing. Oxford University Press, 2003.
- Miskimmin, Esme. 100 British Crime Writers. Springer Nature, 2020.
- Reilly, John M. Twentieth Century Crime & Mystery Writers. Springer, 2015.
- Turnbull, Malcolm J. Elusion Aforethought: The Life and Writing of Anthony Berkeley Cox. Popular Press, 1996.

== Film Adaptation ==
Warner Bros. purchased the film rights to the movie.
