= As for the Woman =

1939 novel

- First edition (UK)
- Author: Anthony Berkeley
- Language: English
- Genre: Drama
- Publisher: Jarrolds (UK); Doubleday (US)
- Publication date: 1939
- Publication place: United Kingdom
- Media type: Print

As for the Woman is a 1939 novel by the British writer Anthony Berkeley, written under the pen name of Francis Iles. It was the final novel of Berkeley, a key writer of the Golden Age of Detective Fiction, as he concentrated on reviewing after this point. He later told fellow writer John Dickson Carr that he produced the book during a period of great emotional strain and that its poor commercial and critical reception affected him badly. Thereafter he turned down all offers to write further novels. Although two further novels under the Iles name were announced by the publisher, neither of them were ever released.

The poor reception may have been due to the fact that he had written two previous novels under the pseudonym Francis Iles which had pioneered the inverted detective story whereas this novel was not a crime novel and focused on the relationship between a younger man and an older woman.

== Synopsis ==
Alan Littlewood, an Oxford undergraduate with a strong inferiority complex, is treated by Doctor Pawle, who manipulates him into a relationship with his own wife in order to make a fool of him.

== Bibliography ==
- Edwards, Martin. The Golden Age of Murder. HarperCollins, 2015.
- Herbert, Rosemary. Whodunit?: A Who's Who in Crime & Mystery Writing. Oxford University Press, 2003.
- Reilly, John M. Twentieth Century Crime & Mystery Writers. Springer, 2015.
- Turnbull, Malcolm J. Elusion Aforethought: The Life and Writing of Anthony Berkeley Cox. Popular Press, 1996.
