= Trial and Error (novel) =

1937 novel by Anthony Berkeley

- First edition (UK)
- Author: Anthony Berkeley
- Language: English
- Genre: Detective
- Publisher: Hodder & Stoughton (UK); Doubleday (US)
- Publication date: 1937
- Publication place: United Kingdom
- Media type: Print

Trial and Error is a 1937 mystery detective novel by the British writer Anthony Berkeley, a prominent author of the Golden Age of Detective Fiction, known for his inverted detective stories.

The story features two of the characters from Berkley's 1929 novel The Piccadilly Murder: the unprepossessing but shrewd Ambrose Chitterwick, and Chief Inspector Moresby of Scotland Yard.

== Plot ==
Lawrence Todhunter, a rather fussy bachelor, is told by his doctor that he has a dangerous aneurism and has only a short time to live. He resolves to do the world a final service by killing a truly evil person, knowing he will not live to face the consequences. Seeking advice from friends and colleagues (who believe he is discussing the idea in the abstract, rather than as a realistic plan) he decides to do away with Miss Jean Norwood, a famous stage actress. Contrary to her public persona, she is in truth a controlling, manipulative and revengeful character. She has lured the popular novelist Nicolas Farroway from his wife, and has manipulated him into installing her in an expensive London flat where she treats him with disdain, openly flirting with Vincent Palmer, the husband of Farroway's eldest daughter Viola. Miss Norwood had initially provided stage roles for Farroway's second daughter Felicity, a promising young actress, but when it became evident that Felicity's talent exceeded her own, she used her influence to prevent her from ever working on the London stage again.

Farroway's funds are becoming exhausted and, believing Todhunter to be a rich man, Miss Norwood switches her attentions to him. She invites him to meet her one evening alone in the garden of her house beside the Thames in Richmond. Todhunter purchases a gun, arrives to find her asleep in a chair, and shoots her. The next morning he visits Farroway, and attempts to confuse the police by switching his revolver with an identical model owned by Vincent Palmer. Satisfied that he has completed his benevolent deed, Todhunter offers to bankroll a new London play in which Felicity will star, then departs on an extended tour of Japan, believing that he will never return.

Five weeks later, he is forced back in haste, having learned from a newspaper that Palmer, who confesses to being in the garden at the time, has been arrested for the murder. The police treat Todhunter as a crank, and he is unable to convince them he is the guilty party. Distraught, he turns to the amateur detective Ambrose Chitterwick to help prove his guilt, but in spite of his efforts Palmer is convicted and his appeal denied. During a re-enactment of the murder, Todhunter suddenly remembers the sound of two shots; he must have fired twice.

The eminent KC Sir Ernest Prettiboy devises with Todhunter's agreement a scheme whereby the MP and social reform leader AW Furze will launch a private prosecution of Todhunter in order to prove him guilty. The scheme succeeeds and Todhunter is convicted. However, in spite of two convictions of different men for the same murder, the Home Secretary still refuses to release Palmer from death row. He is eventually forced to do so by the weight of public opinion after further evidence of Palmer's innocence (fabricated by Chitterwick) comes to light. The authorities make every effort to keep Todhunter alive in prison until the date appointed for him to be hanged. Just as the hangman is preparing Todhunter for execution, Todhunter knocks him out with a blow to the chin, the exertion killing him on the spot. Felicity Farroway is a resounding success in her new play; Chitterwick reflects that her secret must surely now be safe.

== Principal characters ==
- Lawrence Todhunter, 51-year-old bachelor
- Ambrose Chitterwick, amateur investigator
- Miss Jean Norwood, famous stage actress; murder victim
- Nicolas Farroway, mistreated and besotted benefactor of Miss Norwood
- Viola Palmer, elder daughter of Nicolas; married to Vincent
- Vincent Palmer, young husband of Viola; convicted of the murder
- Felicity Farroway, younger daughter of Nicolas; stage actress
- AW Furze, MP and social reform leader
- Sir Ernest Prettiboy, eminent KC

== Television adaptation ==
In 1958 the novel was adapted into a six-part television series Leave It to Todhunter. Produced by the BBC it featured Mervyn Johns as Todhunter, Kynaston Reeves as Chitterwick and Ballard Berkeley as Moresby.

== Bibliography ==
- Baskin, Ellen . Serials on British Television, 1950-1994. Scolar Press, 1996.
- Herbert, Rosemary. Whodunit?: A Who's Who in Crime & Mystery Writing. Oxford University Press, 2003.
- Miskimmin, Esme. 100 British Crime Writers. Springer Nature, 2020.
- Reilly, John M. Twentieth Century Crime & Mystery Writers. Springer, 2015.
- Turnbull, Malcolm J. Elusion Aforethought: The Life and Writing of Anthony Berkeley Cox. Popular Press, 1996.
- White, Terry. Justice Denoted: The Legal Thriller in American, British, and Continental Courtroom Literature. Praeger, 2003.
