= Leave It to Todhunter =

1958 British television series

- Genre: Mystery
- Based on: Trial and Error by Anthony Berkeley
- Written by: Patrick Campbell
- Directed by: Andrew Osborn
- Starring: Mervyn Johns; Kynaston Reeves; Helen Cherry
- Country of origin: United Kingdom
- Original language: English
- No. of series: 1
- No. of episodes: 6

Production
- Producer: Andrew Osborn
- Running time: 30 minutes
- Production company: BBC

Original release
- Network: BBC 1
- Release: 29 September – 3 November 1958

Leave It to Todhunter is a British six-part television series which originally aired on the BBC in 1958. It is based on the 1937 novel Trial and Error by Anthony Berkeley.

== Synopsis ==
Nicholas Alan Todhunter, a mild-mannered little man, discovers he likely has less than six months to live. He resolves to do the world a service by killing an evil character, knowing he will not have to face the consequences. Things go awry when an innocent man is arrested for the killing.

== Cast ==
- Mervyn Johns as Lawrence Todhunter
- Gladys Boot as Mrs Farroway
- Margaret Anderson as Viola Palmer
- Kynaston Reeves as Ambrose Chitterwick
- Ballard Berkeley as DCI Moresby
- Peter Bryant as DS Williams
- Helen Cherry as Marcia Loraine
- Campbell Cotts as Sir Ernest Prettiboy
- John Rae as Dr Kelsey
- Michael Scott as Vincent Palmer
- Ann Firbank as Felicity Farroway
- Lockwood West as Mr Budd
- Richard Caldicot as Nicholas Farroway
- Hugh Morton as Arthur Furze, MP
- Shirley Cooklin as Helen
- Arthur Lowe as Gunsmith
- Jennifer Daniel as Girl

== Bibliography ==
- Baskin, Ellen. Serials on British Television, 1950-1994. Scolar Press, 1996.
