= 1941 New York Film Critics Circle Awards =

7th New York Film Critics Circle Awards

7th New York Film Critics Circle Awards

January ?, 1942
(announced December 31, 1941)

Citizen Kane

The 7th New York Film Critics Circle Awards, announced on 31 December 1941, honored the best filmmaking of 1941.

== Winners ==
- Best Picture:
  - Citizen Kane
- Best Actor:
  - Gary Cooper - Sergeant York
- Best Actress:
  - Joan Fontaine - Suspicion
- Best Director:
  - John Ford - How Green Was My Valley
