= Cicely Disappears =

1927 novel

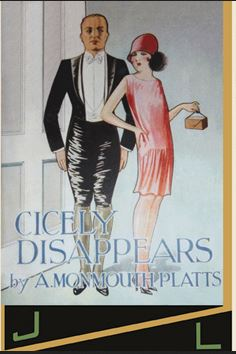
- First edition cover
- Author: Anthony Berkeley
- Language: English
- Genre: Mystery
- Publisher: John Long Ltd
- Publication date: 1927
- Publication place: United Kingdom
- Media type: Print

Cicely Disappears is a 1927 mystery novel by the British writer Anthony Cox, written under the pen name of A. Monmouth Platts. Cox used a variety of pseudonyms during his career, in this case based on two properties he was associated with in Watford. Cox had enjoyed success with novels featuring his private detective Roger Sheringham, at first published anonymously, and also wrote a number of stand-alone novels such as this one.

It was originally serialised in The Daily Mirror during 1926 under the title The Wintringham Mystery. The newspaper held a competition with prizes for those who could give the best answers about the mystery. One of the winners was Colonel Archie Christie, though the entry actually came from his wife, the celebrated crime writer Agatha. It was reissued in 2021 under the original name by British Library Publishing as part of a group of crime novels from the Golden Age of Detective Fiction.

== Bibliography ==
- Edwards, Martin. The Golden Age of Murder. HarperCollins, 2015.
- Herbert, Rosemary. Whodunit?: A Who's Who in Crime & Mystery Writing. Oxford University Press, 2003.
- Reilly, John M. Twentieth Century Crime & Mystery Writers. Springer, 2015.
- Turnbull, Malcolm J. Elusion Aforethought: The Life and Writing of Anthony Berkeley Cox. Popular Press, 1996.
