= Not to Be Taken =

1938 novel

- First edition (UK)
- Author: Anthony Berkeley
- Language: English
- Genre: Detective
- Publisher: Hodder & Stoughton (UK); Doubleday (US)
- Publication date: 1938
- Publication place: United Kingdom
- Media type: Print

Not to Be Taken is a 1938 mystery detective novel by the British writer Anthony Berkeley. It was one of several stand-alone novels he wrote alongside his series featuring the private detective Roger Sheringham. It was written when the Golden Age of Detective Fiction was at its height. It was published in the United States with the alternative title A Puzzle in Poison.

== Synopsis ==
In the small English village of Anneypenney, the death of the squire John Waterhouse is at first taken to be natural. However, his brother suspects murder and demands the body is exhumed and it is revealed he died from arsenic poisoning. The problem is, nobody seems to have a motive for having killed the victim.

== Bibliography ==
- Herbert, Rosemary. Whodunit?: A Who's Who in Crime & Mystery Writing. Oxford University Press, 2003.
- Miskimmin, Esme. 100 British Crime Writers. Springer Nature, 2020.
- Reilly, John M. Twentieth Century Crime & Mystery Writers. Springer, 2015.
- Turnbull, Malcolm J. Elusion Aforethought: The Life and Writing of Anthony Berkeley Cox. Popular Press, 1996.
- Turnbull, Malcolm J. Victims Or Villains: Jewish Images in Classic English Detective Fiction. Popular Press, 1998.
