= Make Your Own Murder Party =

1986 role-playing video game

- Developer: Trans Fiction Systems
- Publisher: Electronic Arts
- Platforms: Apple II, Commodore 64, MS-DOS
- Release: 1986

Make Your Own Murder Party is a role-playing video game published in 1986 by Electronic Arts.

== Gameplay ==
The host of the murder mystery game inputs a series of data about their party guests, and the game automatically generates a mystery with a murder, motives, and a series of clues. These are all able to be printed as player booklets. The game is also able to print invites for the guests, and offers advice on how to host the perfect murder mystery. Once the booklets have been printed out, the game becomes purely physical like a normal murder mystery party; the game simply allows a streamlined process to generate a mystery.

== Reception ==
Compute!'s Gazette approved of the computer not being needed for the party after Make Your Own Murder Party's use. Kiplinger's Personal Finance noted the game's usefulness in helping a host prepare and organise a game, due to "meticulous planning" being crucial in a murder mystery party being successful.

James Trunzo reviewed the game for Computer Gaming World, and stated that "Electronic Arts has produced yet another product worthy of your attention."
