= My Name Is Rachel Corrie =

2005 British play

- Original language: English
- Characters: Rachel Corrie
- Subject: Rachel Corrie
- Genre: Political

Premiere
- Date: 2005
- Place: London, England

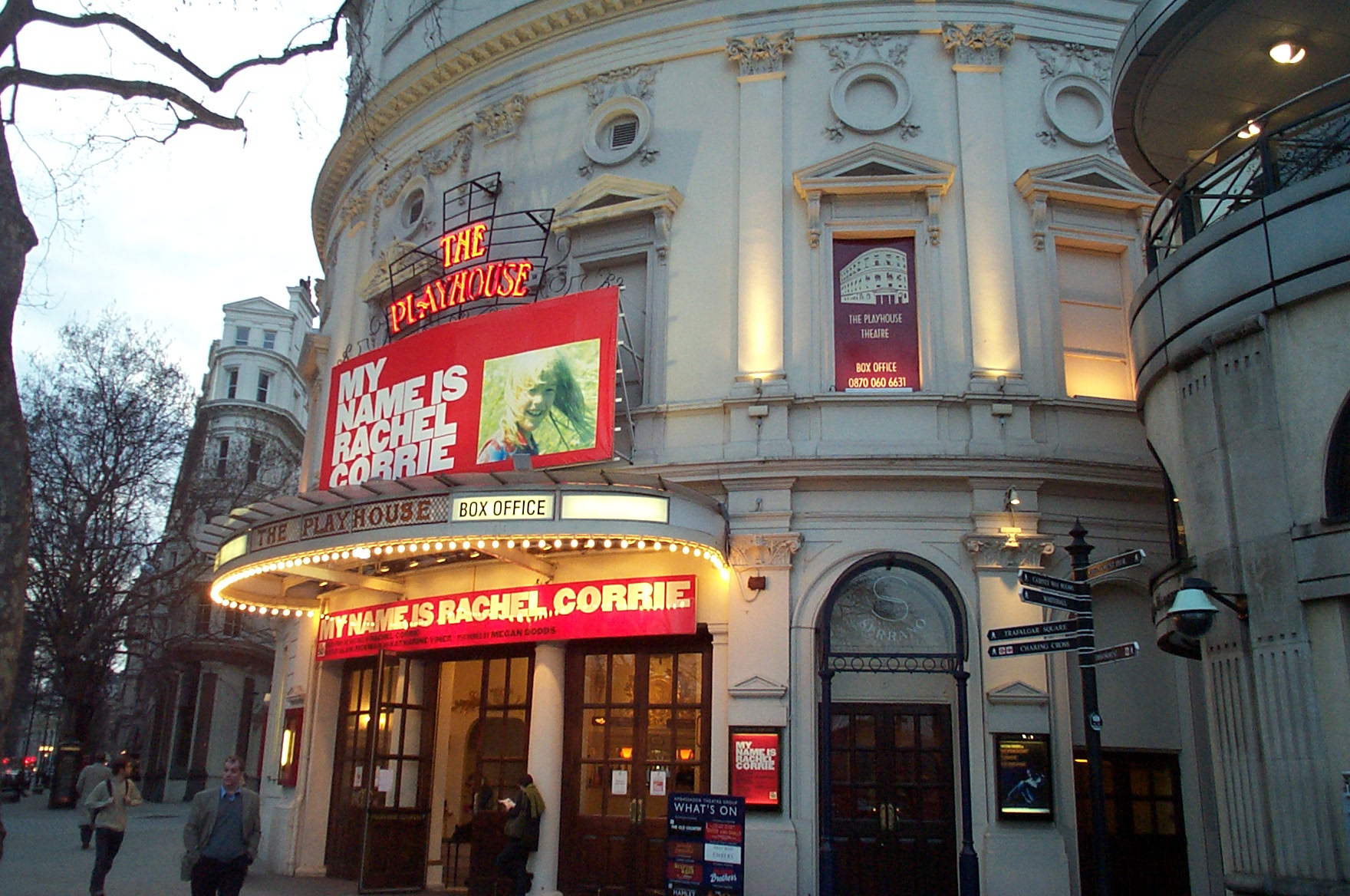
My Name Is Rachel Corrie at the Playhouse Theatre, London, 2006.

My Name Is Rachel Corrie is a play based on the diaries and emails of activist Rachel Corrie, who was killed by an Israeli soldier when she was aged 23. It was jointly edited by journalist Katharine Viner and actor Alan Rickman, who also directed it.

Rachel Corrie (10 April 1979 – 16 March 2003) was an American Evergreen State College student and member of the International Solidarity Movement (ISM) who travelled to the Gaza Strip during the Second Intifada. She was killed in the Gaza Strip by a Caterpillar D9R armoured bulldozer operated by the Israel Defense Forces (IDF) while protecting the family home of local pharmacist Samir Nasrallah from demolition by the IDF.

== Initial stagings and response ==
Alan Rickman first staged My Name is Rachel Corrie in April 2005 at the Royal Court Theatre, London, and the play went on to win the Theatregoers' Choice Awards for Best Director and Best New Play, as well as Best Solo Performance for actress Megan Dodds.

The play was scheduled to be transferred to the New York Theatre Workshop in March 2006. However, the New York theatre decided that, because of what it deemed to be political content, the play was to be "postponed indefinitely", after the artistic director polled numerous Jewish and Zionist groups for their reaction to the play. Rickman and Viner denounced the decision and withdrew the show.

Rickman said: "I can only guess at the pressures of funding an independent theatre company in New York, but calling this production 'postponed' does not disguise the fact that it has been cancelled. This is censorship born out of fear, and the New York Theatre Workshop, the Royal Court, New York audiences – all of us are the losers."

The play ran as a commercial production at the Minetta Lane Theatre in Greenwich Village in the fall of 2006.

== Reviews ==
Cover of book version of the play

The original London production received the following review from Michael Billington in April 2005:

Corrie went to Gaza specifically to support Palestinians whose homes were being demolished and makes no attempt to hide her partiality.

And, while she distinguishes between Jewish people and Israeli politicians, she is appalled by what she sees: the checkpoints that prevent people getting to jobs and places of education, the casual destruction of wells, the children who grow up with tank-shell holes in their walls. Theatre has no obligation to give a complete picture. Its only duty is to be honest. And what you get here is a stunning account of one woman's passionate response to a particular situation.

And the passion comes blazing through in Corrie's eloquent reaction to her father's inquiry about Palestinian violence. As she says, if we lived where tanks and soldiers and bulldozers could destroy our homes at any moment and where our lives were completely strangled, wouldn't we defend ourselves as best we could? The danger of right-on propaganda is avoided by the specificity of Rickman's Theatre Upstairs production. Above all, this is a portrait of a woman....

The theatre critic Clive Davis gave a short assessment of the same production for The Times:

As for the scenes set in Israel – brilliantly evoked by Hildegard Bechtler's bullet-pocked concrete set – an element of unvarnished propaganda comes to the fore. With no attempt made to set the violence in context, we are left with the impression of unarmed civilians being crushed by faceless militarists. Early on, Corrie makes a point of informing us that more Israelis have been killed in road accidents than in all the country's wars put together. As she jots down thoughts in her notebook and fires off e-mails to her parents, she declares that "the vast majority of Palestinians right now, as far as I can tell, are engaging in Gandhian non-violent resistance". Even the late Yassir Arafat might have blushed at that one.

A later production in Vancouver, Canada, in January 2008 was reviewed by Peter Birnie for the Vancouver Sun:

An excellent piece of polemic, My Name is Rachel Corrie is a powerful slap at the state of Israel. Weighing the show simply on its merits as left-wing agitprop, this is a compelling production. The play asks us to condemn Israel's heavy-handed treatment of Palestinians, and does so with compelling intelligence. It closes with a particularly powerful piece of video, showing an adolescent Rachel Corrie speaking with youthful enthusiasm about helping shape a better world. Fine. Okay. But can we please see a companion piece of theatre about a certain desert-kingdom royal family and its deep complicity in fomenting terrorism against, among many others, Israel and the world's Jewish communities? Let's call it My Name is Osama bin Laden.

== Other stagings ==
My Name Is Rachel Corrie played at the West End's Playhouse Theatre in London from March through May 2006. In July 2006, Josephine Taylor took over the role and the show played the Galway Arts Festival, before moving to the Edinburgh Fringe in August. It opened at the Minetta Lane Theatre in New York in October 2006, with Megan Dodds returning as Corrie, and closed on 17 December 2006.

Variety reports:

Jack Rose, from the CanStage board – while admitting he has neither read nor seen the script – said that "my view was it would provoke a negative reaction in the Jewish community." And philanthropist Bluma Appel, after whom CanStage's flagship theater is named, concurred. "I told them I would react very badly to a play that was offensive to Jews."

The Seattle Repertory Theatre ran My Name is Rachel Corrie from 15 March to 6 May 2007, directed by Braden Abraham, featuring Marya Sea Kaminski as Corrie. This showing drew publicity and spawned the creation of a website, Rachel Corrie Facts, intended to provide information and context to balance to what many perceive as a "one-sided, anti-Israel diatribe".

The Australian premiere of My Name is Rachel Corrie opened on 14 May 2008 at Downstairs Belvoir St Theatre. It had an extended season and was nominated for Best Performer (Belinda Bromilow), Best Direction (Shannon Murphy) and Best Independent Production (Bareboards Production) at the Sydney Theatre Critics Awards for 2008, winning the latter. The production was also featured on the SBS television program Dateline.

My Name Is Rachel Corrie was one of the featured plays of the Contemporary American Theater Festival in Shepherdstown, West Virginia, shown from 6–29 July 2007. Ed Herendeen was the director, and Anne Marie Nest played Corrie.

Purple Bench Productions produced the play in Chicago 12 September – 5 October 2008. Jessie Fisher portrayed Corrie and it was directed by Emmy Kreilkamp.

The Canadian premiere of My Name is Rachel Corrie was produced by Neworld Theatre in Vancouver, BC, and opened in January 2008 at the Havana Theatre, starring Adrienne Wong.

Some performances have featured post-show discussions.

The New Repertory Theatre in Watertown, Massachusetts staged My Name is Rachel Corrie on 8 March 5 April 2008. Directed by David R. Gammons, featuring Stacy Fischer as Rachel Corrie. The production was played in rep with Pieces by Israeli-American Zohar Tirosh as part of a larger project entitled Their Voices Will Be Heard: Artists Respond to the Israeli/Palestinian Situation, which also included readings of plays by Nitzan Halperin, Meron Langsner (who at the time was New Rep's NNPN playwright in residence), and Larry Loebell, as well as film screenings and academic panels. New Rep published a pamphlet of critical responses entitled Supporting Voices/Dissenting Voices which was co-edited by Meron Langsner and M. Bevin O'Garra to accompany the theatrical events.

A reading of the play took place in Dublin, Ireland, on 15 March 2008, at the Project Arts Centre. The reading was presented by Amnesty International Irish Section and Fishamble theatre company. Actress Megan Riordan performed the reading.

In 2007, the play was staged in Lima, Peru, at La Plaza ISIL theatre under the direction of Nishme Sumar and featuring Gisela Ponce De Leon as Corrie. This was the first performance of the play in a Spanish-speaking country.

Theatre Yes in Edmonton, Alberta, staged My Name is Rachel Corrie 28 March – 12 April 2008.

Theatre PANIK staged the play at Tarragon Theatre in Toronto, opening 29 May 2008 with Bethany Jillard performing the role. The production was directed by Kate Lushington. All four local daily papers gave the play and the actress enthusiastic reviews, but the theatre critic Lynn Slotkin in CBC Toronto radio show Here and Now was highly critical of every aspect of the play.

The Kraine Theater in Manhattan staged the show under the direction of Ashley Marinaccio and Robert Gonyo of Co-Op Theatre East. The show was unique in that there were two actors portraying Rachel Corrie — Theresa Christine and Stephanie Shafir as the young Rachel Corrie.

In October 2015 the play was staged at the Corpus Playroom, Cambridge, UK. Rachel Corrie was portrayed by Ella Duffy, the daughter of Carol Ann Duffy. The show received critical acclaim, described as "a brilliant, barnstorming performance".

The play was staged in Winnipeg, Canada at the Irish Association of Manitoba, as part of the 2016 MayWorks Festival of Labour and the Arts. The staging featured the role of Corrie and the other figures in her life divided between five actors. The production did consultation and post-show talkbacks with Independent Jewish Voices.

The play was produced in Corrie's hometown of Olympia Washington for the first time in 2017 at Harlequin Productions from 19 January to 11 February. The play was directed by Jeff Painter. The role of Corrie was portrayed by Kira Batcheller.

The play was staged in Manchester in 2026 at 53Two from 18 to 21 March, directed by Ian Kershaw, with Coronation Street actress Harriet Bibby playing Corrie.

== See also ==
- First Intifada
- Western Wall Tunnel riots
