= The Poisoned Chocolates Case =

1929 novel by Anthony Berkeley

- First edition (UK)
- Author: Anthony Berkeley
- Language: English
- Genre: Detective fiction
- Publisher: Collins (UK); Doubleday, Doran (US)
- Publication date: 1929
- Publication place: United Kingdom
- Media type: Print

The Poisoned Chocolates Case (1929) is a detective novel by Anthony Berkeley set in 1920s London and featuring his detectives Roger Sheringham and Ambrose Chitterwick. Six armchair detectives meet to discuss a murder that has baffled the police, each suggesting their own individual solutions. The novel is an elaborated version of the 1929 long short story "The Avenging Chance", which has been considered the author's masterpiece. In the short story, Sheringham solves the case, but in the novel that solution is not accepted as the correct one.

The novel is known for demonstrating that many equally wrong deductions can be made from a single fact. In addition to the solutions to the crime given in the story, later writers have tried their hand at creating their own solutions.

== Plot ==
Roger Sheringham, amateur detective, is founder and president of the Crimes Circle, a private club of armchair detectives who meet regularly to discuss criminal cases of mutual interest. The club's speaker this evening is Chief Inspector Moresby of Scotland Yard, who is to talk about a murder that the police have thus far been unable to solve. Sheringham suggests that club members should work independently on their own solutions. After a week, each will present their findings on consecutive nights to their colleagues.

Moresby outlines the case. Arriving at his London club at 10:30 am precisely, which he has been doing every morning for many years, Sir Eustace Pennyfeather is handed by the porter a complimentary box of chocolates which has arrived through the post, addressed to Sir Eustace personally. Disapproving of such modern marketing techniques, Sir Eustace is about to throw the unwanted gift away in disgust but changes his mind when he learns from Graham Bendix, a wealthy member of the club whom he hardly knows and who happens to be standing nearby, that he has lost a bet with his wife Joan and now owes her a box of chocolates. Bendix takes the box home and tries out the new confectionery with his wife. The chocolates are poisoned, and few hours later Joan is dead; her husband, who has eaten far fewer, is taken seriously ill, but recovers. The police are at a loss, and conclude that the sender must have been a fanatic trying to rid society of Sir Eustace, a notorious and persistent womaniser.

A week later the club members reconvene, and over the next few evenings hear from each member in turn. Sir Charles Wildman identifies the murderer as Lady Pennyfeather; she is already divorcing her philandering husband, but has heard that he intends to re-marry again immediately and fears that he will make a new will voiding a valuable insurance policy that will pay out to her on his death. Mrs Fielder-Flemming accuses Sir Charles, acting to protect his infatuated daughter Dora from the attentions of Sir Eustace who wants to marry her for her money as soon as his divorce comes through. Morton Bradley builds a detailed circumstantial case and concludes that the only person who could possibly have committed the murder is Bradley himself. Roger Sheringham accuses Bendix, arguing that the chocolates had found their intended target, namely his wife, Sir Eustace's involvement having being set up as a misdirection. Alicia Dammers makes a powerful case for Sir Eustace, his motive being to eliminate Joan Bendix who has information that will block his intended marriage to Dora Wildman. On the final evening, Ambrose Chitterwick sets out his own solution: that the murderer was in fact Alicia Dammers, attempting to protect her position as secret mistress of Sir Eustace; he had transferred his affections to Joan after it became clear that his proposed marriage to Dora was going to be blocked.

Alicia Dammers picks up her belongings and leaves the meeting, pleading another appointment.

== Principal characters ==
=== Armchair detectives ===
- Roger Sheringham, founder and President of the Crimes Circle
- Sir Charles Wildman KC, famous barrister
- Mrs Fielder-Flemming, popular playwright
- Morton Harrogate Bradley (Percy Robinson), detective-story writer
- Alicia Dammers, brilliant novelist
- Ambrose Chitterwick, retiring and diffident detective-story aficionado

=== Involved in the case ===
- Chief Inspector Moresby of Scotland Yard, Crimes Circle after-dinner speaker
- Sir Eustace Pennyfeather, womaniser
- Pauline, Lady Pennyfeather, Sir Eustace's estranged wife
- Graham Bendix, wealthy young property owner
- Joan Bendix (nee Cullompton), wife of Graham; murder victim
- Dora Wildman, daughter of Sir Charles, infatuated with Sir Eustace

== Background ==
The Poisoned Chocolates Case is an elaborated version of Berkley's 1929 long short story "The Avenging Chance", considered by Barzun and Taylor to be his masterpiece in which "not a word, move, clue or comment is out of place". In the short story, Roger Sheringham solves the case, but in the novel that solution is not accepted as the correct one.

== Critical reception ==
Barzun and Taylor were less complimentary of the novel than of the short story. They suggested that the addition of 'filler', in which additional twists were added to the original strong idea, reduces the tension, and that as a result the plot loses much of its force. In an essay of 1946, John Dickson Carr was of a different opinion, listing The Poisoned Chocolates Case as one of the ten books he considered the best of the genre. Writing in 2017, Martin Edwards praised the novel for its entertaining illustration of the fact that, in real life as opposed to old-fashioned detective stories, many equally wrong deductions can be made from a single fact. In addition to those given in the novel, other writers have tried their hand at their own solutions: Christianna Brand in 1979 and Edwards himself in 2016.

== Sources ==
- Barzun, Jacques; Taylor, Wendall Hertig (1989). A Catalogue of Crime (2nd ed.). New York: Harper & Row. ISBN 0-06-015796-8.
- Edwards, Martin (2017). The Story of Classic Crime in 100 Books. London: The British Library. ISBN 978 0 7123 5696 1.
