= Malice Aforethought (film) =

2005 television film

- DVD Cover
- Created by: Francis Iles (Novel); Andrew Payne (Screenplay)
- Starring: Ben Miller; Barbara Flynn; Richard Armitage
- Composer: Stephen McKeon
- Country of origin: United Kingdom
- Original language: English
- No. of series: 1
- No. of episodes: 2

Production
- Executive producers: Charles Elton; Rebecca Eaton
- Producer: Keith Thompson
- Running time: 180 min
- Production companies: Granada Television; WGBH; World 2000 Entertainment

Original release
- Network: ITV
- Release: 10 April – 11 April 2005

Malice Aforethought is a 2005 ITV drama based on Anthony Berkeley Cox’s 1931 novel of the same name, written under the pen name Francis Iles, made by Granada Television. There was an earlier BBC television adaptation of this novel in 1979.

== Synopsis ==
Set in the 1920s in a Devon village, the plot concerns the complicated love life of Dr. Edmund Bickleigh and his plans to resolve his unhappy marriage by murdering his wife. It is an early and well-known example of the "inverted detective story".

== Cast ==
- Dr Edmund Bickleigh – Ben Miller
- Julia Bickleigh – Barbara Flynn
- Ivy Ridgeway – Lucy Brown
- Madeleine Cranmere – Megan Dodds
- Mrs Ridgeway – Kate O’Toole
- Widdicombe – Peter Vaughan
- William Chatford – Richard Armitage
