= Murder mystery game =

Party game genre

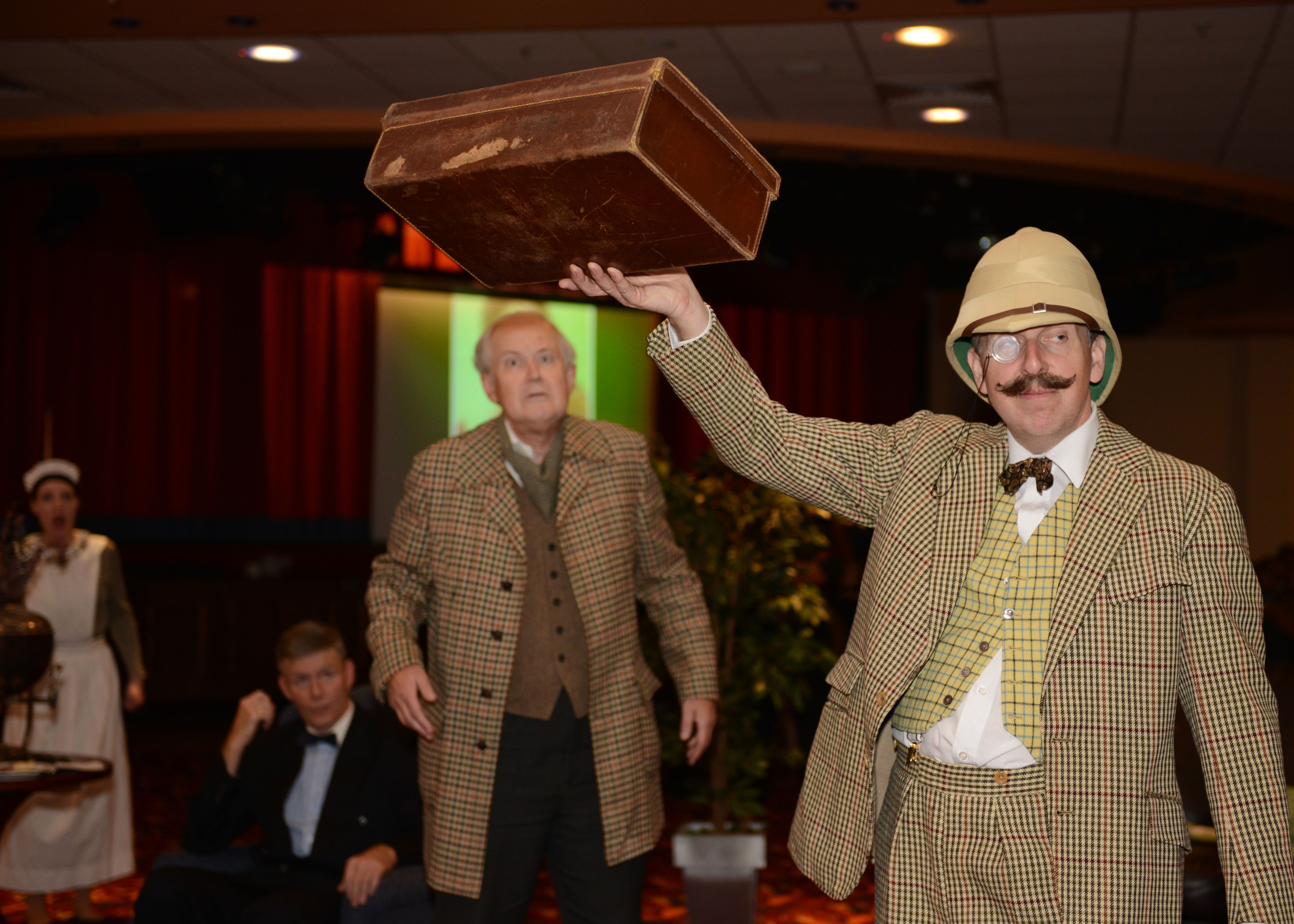
- A character in costume revealing a clue, at a live action murder mystery game
- Genres: Social game, Party game

Related games
- Social deduction game

A murder mystery game is a type of party game in which players investigate and solve fictitious murders. In many variations, a player secretly plays as a murderer while the others attempt to determine the murderer's identity.

These games typically involve a group of 6 to 20 people.

== Origin ==
The murder mystery fiction genre began in the first half of the 19th century. The party game wink murder dates back to the early 20th century and involves one player secretly selected as a murderer, who can "kill" other players by winking at them. A killed player must count to five before "dying", and the murderer tries to avoid detection.

Jury Box, released in 1937, is considered the first murder mystery game. In this game, the players, acting as jurors, are given a murder scenario, evidence presented by the district attorney and defendant, two photographs of the crime scene, and ballot papers. After the players have made their decision as to who is guilty, the real solution is read out.

Cluedo, known as Clue in North America, was released in 1948 and is renowned as the first murder mystery board game. Players collect information to solve the killer, weapon, and scene of the crime.

The 1980s saw the introduction of role-playing murder mystery games in a "How To Host" boxed format. These early scenarios were generally simpler than modern games, with minimal acting directions and relied on the guests being comfortable ad-libbing responses to each other's questions.

In 1986, Dimitry Davidoff created the party game Mafia, where players sit in a room and a number of secret mafia members conspire to "murder" innocent players during eyes-closed night phases. This led to a genre of social deduction games where players attempt to uncover a secret subgroup.

== Gameplay ==
=== Dinner party games ===
Modern murder mystery games for dinner parties are often structured so that each guest is equally involved. Murder Mystery Dinner Party Game Kits can take the form of scripted games or interactive games. A player's preference will be driven by how they want their party to progress:

- Scripted Games are where a small group of people sit around a table and play a planned out Murder Mystery.
- Interactive games are set up similar to parties, with the players having to find clues to figure out who the murderer is instead of scripts.

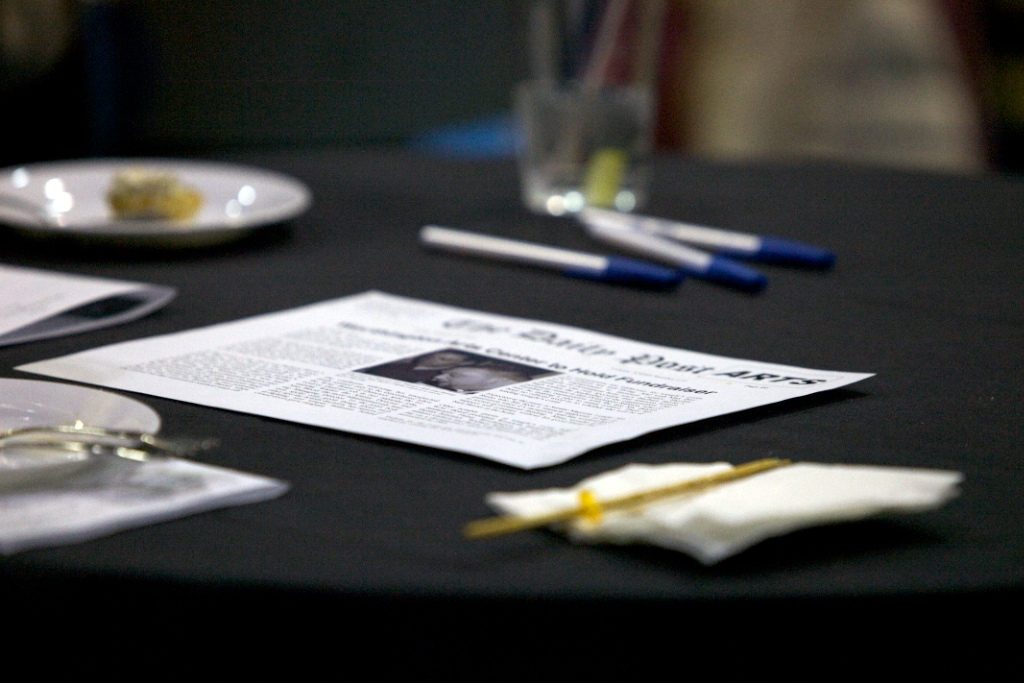
A newspaper article prop for a live-action murder mystery game

In scripted murder mystery games, the participants are told exactly what to say and when. They are often provided with introductory statements, questions to ask, answers to give, and occasionally some shared dialogue to break the ice. Character information often comes in booklets which are read from throughout the course of the evening, usually around a table in rounds with the sole purpose of solving the murder. These games gained popularity in the 1990s, particularly with the How to Host a Murder series. Scripted games allow no opportunity for ad-libbing; while players may portray their characters, their interactions are confined to the information furnished by the game.

In interactive murder mystery games, participants are provided with character backgrounds and confidential information. Unlike scripted games, these feature multiple subplots, and the goal extends beyond merely solving the murder. Typically, a dinner takes place during the event, but guests are not confined to sitting around a table; they are free to move about and engage with others at will. Participants are encouraged to interrogate, perform actions, or engage in activities with fellow guests, aiding them in solving the case or fulfilling their characters' individual objectives. Interactive games permit ad-libbing, allowing players to develop their characters in original directions. In some versions, the murderer is aware of their role from the outset, while in others, this information is revealed to everyone during the solution round.

The games for 6 to 20+ players usually takes over 2–3 hours and the players use their character booklets and clues (i.e., the game contents) to delve into the background of the murder using the questions, answers, hints, evidence, and clues provided. These are all designed to elicit more and more information about the murder until the players are in a good position to suggest who they believe the guilty party is.

More often than not, hosts invite players to attend the party dressed as, and ready to play the part of, one of the suspects listed in the game scenario. The scripted game is usually played over a three-course dinner party, whereas an interactive game can be played in a mix-and-mingle style format with finger foods, a buffet, or a sit-down dinner.

Interactive games are also used in team-building environments. Companies and church groups have found them to be a good resource for fostering good communication skills and building closer relationships among individuals. Organizers of the mystery can assign roles and characters based on their knowledge of the guests.

=== Large group murder mystery game ===
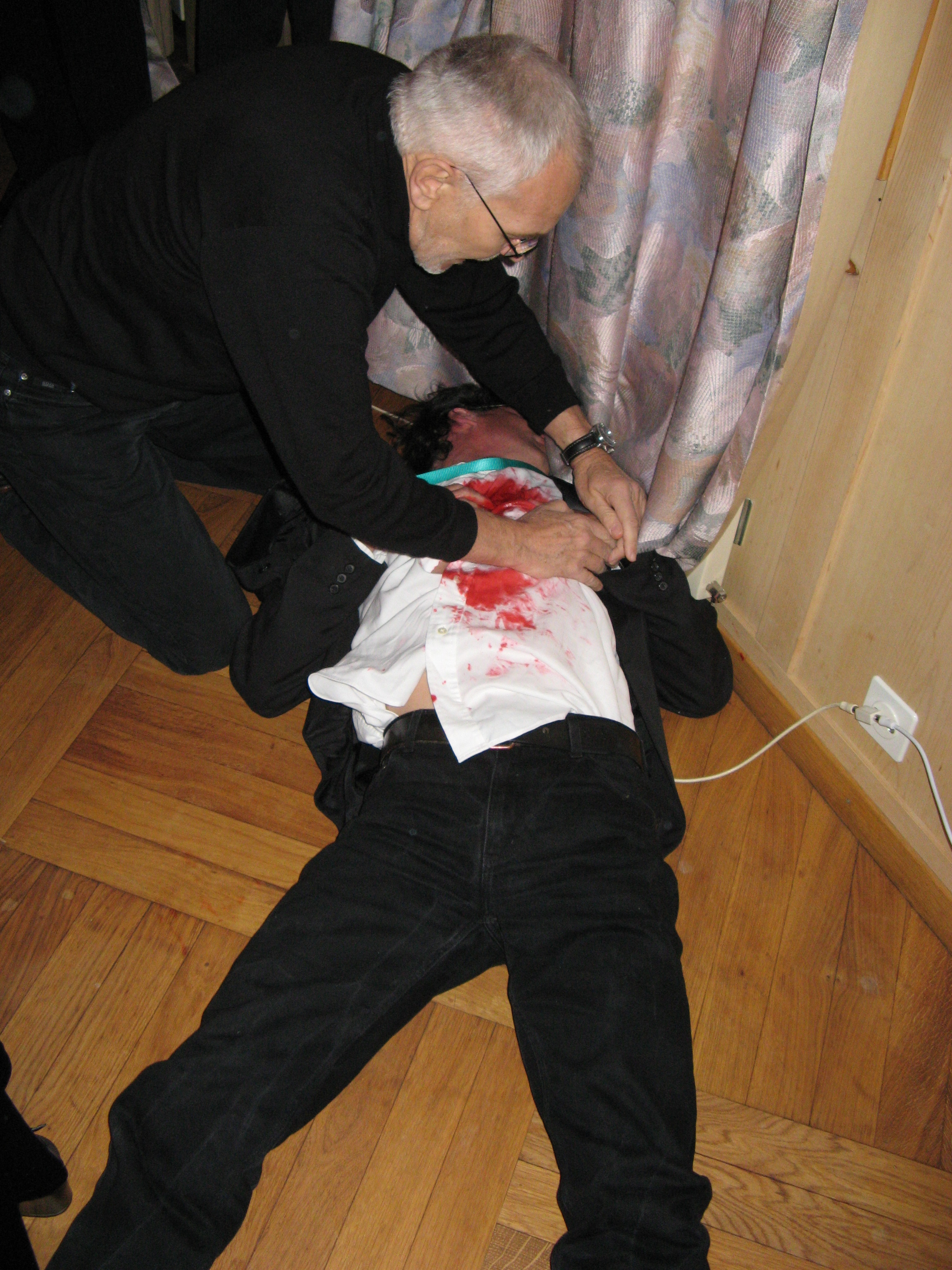
An actor playing dead at a live action murder mystery game

Because not everyone can take a role in a large group game, the role of "suspect" is usually given to actors, who learn scripts or ad lib a performance which will gradually reveal who the murderer is to the other guests. The actors are fully "in the know" about all aspects of the case.

The remaining guests will take on the role of detective and it will be their "job" to actively solve the case by examining evidence, finding clues, following and questioning suspects.

Large group events can be run in several ways including:

- In a single room with a staged theatrical performance.
- With actors acting "in the round" amongst the guests.
- In multiple rooms with clues scattered throughout the venue and suspects in different areas.
- As more traditional card games with clue cards given to the guests with chunks of information on each one.
- In video format with evidence being presented to teams after watching suspect videos.
- In a combination of script and clue evidence.

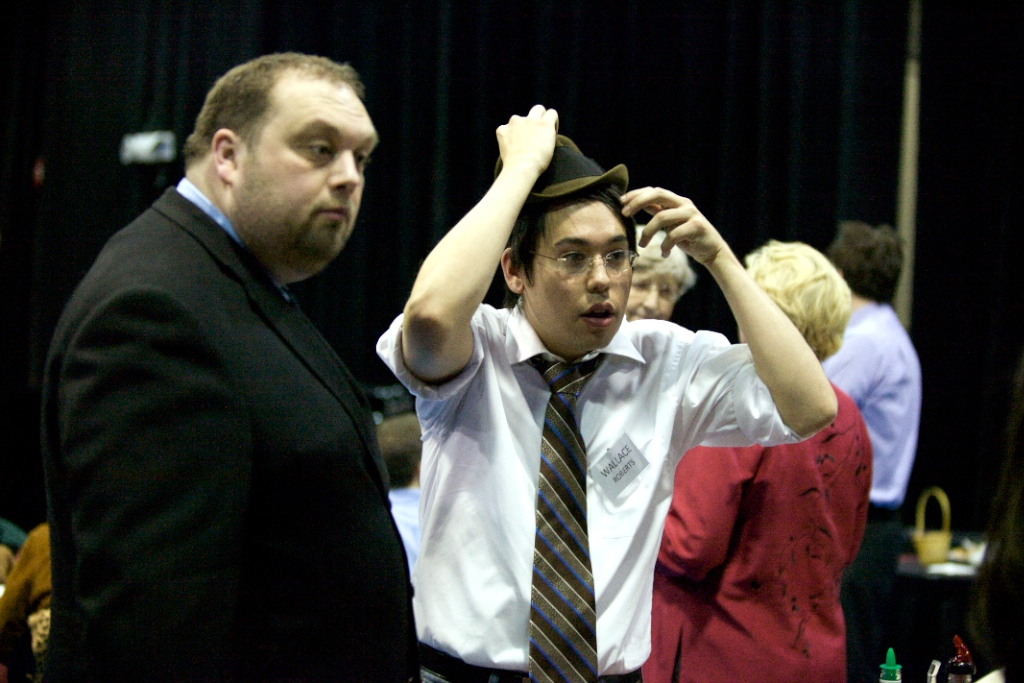
Costumed players in a murder mystery

Large group games are often played in a hired venue, a restaurant, a hotel, or at a workplace. They are often used for fundraisers, team building, and corporate events.

Live versions of murder mystery shows, in which guests attend commercial venues such as hotels as paying viewers, are sometimes classified as dinner theater or mystery dinners, rather than murder mystery games.

However, there are interactive games that were created for large groups of over 200 guests. Typically, these events are hosted like the other format of interactive games, but some characters in the game are expanded into teams to allow for everyone in the group to have a role.

=== Jubensha ===
Murder-mystery games known as jubensha (lit. 'scripted murder') became popular in China in the late 2010s, where players meet around a table and read through a script to deduce who among them is the murderer. Jubensha can be played in a tabletop format or as an immersive experience combining elements of live action role-playing and escape rooms. Players are assigned characters from a selection of scripts, and games are often held at dedicated venues where participants pay to take part. Some venues offer "immersive jubensha" games where players dress in costume, and venue staff perform the roles of non-player characters (NPCs).

The games draw inspiration from Western murder mystery evenings. The format gained popularity around 2015 through Chinese reality television programs featuring celebrities playing murder mystery games, including Lying Man, Dinner Party Seduction, and later Who's the Murderer. Their popularity contributed to the growth of dedicated jubensha clubs and venues. By early 2022, there were more than 30,000 jubensha venues in China.

== Versions ==
Murder mystery games come in several different versions:

- Scripted or turn-based games work by releasing information throughout the game. As the game progresses, each character learns something new about the plot and their involvement. Each turn, players ask specific questions or perhaps read from a script. These are popularly played around the table at a dinner party.
- Interactive murder mystery games provide players with details of their character from the start, but it is up to the character to determine how they solve the murder. Often players have other objectives – such as to be the richest player at the end of the game. Most people will have their secrets that have nothing to do with the murder. This provides even more reasons for players to interact with each other. These games are better suited to buffets or finger food as generally, everyone needs to be able to mingle and also to talk to others without being overheard. Some are done during a sit-down dinner as long as time is provided afterward for guests to move about and mingle.
- Video-based or online interactive mystery games will use video to provide the back story of the crime and may provide witness testimonials or show evidence to allow guests to solve the case in a more "game" style format. These are often played individually, and occasionally in larger groups, on the internet.
- Murder mysteries can be played on internet forums, the organizer privately notifies the murderer to let them know and they must try to blame someone else on the thread. At the end of a round, the organizer reveals the murderer.
- Variants may involve changing the nature of the crime (especially if younger players are involved), allowing some participants to know certain facts in advance (even the identity of the murderer), or having 'plot twists' of unexpected events to occur, to help or hinder the investigation, as needed. Games may contain scavenger hunts, puzzles, and problems to solve.

== In popular culture ==
The 1934 Ngaio Marsh murder mystery A Man Lay Dead is set during a murder-mystery party in an English country house, where a guest is actually murdered with a dagger.

Characters in the 1973 whodunit film The Last of Sheila play a scavenger hunt mystery game where they are assigned secret roles. Writer Stephen Sondheim based the script on a murder mystery game he created after college, where he "told each person to think of a way to kill one of the others over the weekend we would be spending together in the country".

The 1985 comedy mystery film Clue is based on the board game of the same name, following six guests invited to an old mansion, where they become suspects in a murder investigation. The film was released with multiple endings, offering three different solutions to the crime.

The 2022 film Glass Onion opens with a technology billionaire inviting friends and influencers to a remote island to play a murder mystery game.

== See also ==
- Make Your Own Murder Party - 1986 commercial video game/murder mystery planning tool
