= Malice Aforethought =

1931 crime novel by Francis Iles

- First edition
- Author: Anthony Berkeley writing as Francis Iles
- Language: English
- Genre: Crime novel
- Publisher: Gollancz
- Publication date: 1931
- Publication place: England
- Media type: Print (Hardcover and Paperback)
- Followed by: Before the Fact

Malice Aforethought (1931) is a crime novel written by Anthony Berkeley Cox, using the pen name Francis Iles. It is an early and prominent example of the "inverted detective story", claimed to have been invented by R. Austin Freeman some years earlier. The murderer's identity is revealed in the first line of the novel, which gives the reader insight into the workings of his mind as his plans progress. It also contains elements of black comedy, and of serious treatment of underlying tensions in a superficially respectable community. It is loosely based on the real-life case of Herbert Armstrong, with elements of Doctor Crippen.

== Plot summary ==
The opening sentence has been described as "immortal": "It was not until several weeks after he had decided to murder his wife that Doctor Bickleigh took any active steps in the matter."

Edmund Bickleigh, a physician with a modest rural practice, is in a loveless marriage with the domineering childless Julia. He consoles himself with young unmarried women, in particular the accommodating Ivy. Into his village arrives Madeleine, a rich young woman, who succumbs to his attentions but warns she will not marry him if he divorces. Reasoning that she will, however, marry him if he is a widower, he cruelly starts to poison Julia. To relieve her increasing pain he gives her increasing doses of morphine, until she dies miserably.

Madeleine then rejects him, to marry a wealthy young man, while the rejected Ivy also marries a well-off lawyer. Rumours start spreading that Julia's death was not accidental, fuelled by the antagonism towards Edmund of Madeleine's husband and Ivy's husband, who both bitterly resent that he was the seducer of their wives. Attempting to stop the gossip, Edmund poisons Ivy's husband and Madeleine as well. Not unaware of the rumours and the suspicious deaths, the police investigate and Edmund is put on trial. Acquitted of murdering his unfortunate wife, a second trial wrongly convicts him for the death of Madeleine's husband and he is executed.

== Adaptations ==
The novel has been adapted for television twice.

The first was a BBC serial in 1979.

A second adaptation Malice Aforethought, starring Ben Miller as Dr. Bickleigh, Megan Dodds as Madeleine, and Barbara Flynn as Julia, was produced by Granada Television and broadcast on ITV in 2005. It too has been shown on Mystery! in 2005.
