= Before the Fact =

1932 novel by Anthony Berkeley Cox

- First edition
- Author: Anthony Berkeley writing as Francis Iles
- Language: English
- Genre: Crime novel
- Publisher: Gollancz
- Publication date: 1932
- Publication place: England
- Media type: Print (hardback and paperback)
- Preceded by: Malice Aforethought

Before the Fact (1932) is an English novel by Anthony Berkeley Cox writing under the pen name "Francis Iles". It tells the story of a woman marrying a man who is after her inherited money and prepared, it seems, to kill her for it. Whether he does succeed in the end, or whether she has been imagining his plots, is left unclear. Together with the previous Iles book Malice Aforethought (1931), it can be placed in the category of psychological suspense novel. Elements of the story were used for the 1941 American film Suspicion, directed by Alfred Hitchcock.

== Plot ==
At age 28, plain and bookish Lina McLaidlaw lives a life of boredom with her retired parents in an English village. Her prettier sister has married a rising writer, but Lina never meets any men she could accept until the arrival of charming Johnnie Aysgarth, from an impoverished and disreputable family. Her father is opposed to a marriage, and everyone seems to know that all Johnnie is after is Lina's money.

However they are soon married, enjoy a long and expensive honeymoon abroad, and return to a large country house that Johnnie has acquired and extravagantly furnished. When Lina wonders how the jobless Johnnie has met all this outlay, and what he expects to live on, he eventually admits that he borrowed everything. Gradually the more level-headed Lina takes charge of the family finances, relying on an allowance from her father, and pushes Johnnie into finding a job. He gains a good post nearby, managing the country estate of a distant relation, while she looks after their house. She would like a baby, but doesn't get pregnant.

After the first shock of discovering Johnnie's huge debt, and the fact that he lied, other shocks keep arriving. She discovers that he is a practised thief, stealing jewellery from a guest and from her to sell. Her inherited furniture also starts disappearing, until she tracks some of it to an antique shop. He is a forger, putting her signature on cheques. Worse, he is sacked from his job for embezzling money.

An unrepentant gambler, Johnnie squanders the money at the racetrack and casinos, while also pursuing other women. Any number of local wives and daughters have had affairs with him, for which he rents a flat in a nearby town, and one of their servants has a son by him. When all this comes into the open, the childless Lina at last leaves to stay with her sister in London. There she is introduced at a party to an affectionate unmarried artist, who wants her to get a divorce and marry him. But Lina refuses to sleep with him, instead returning to her purgatory with Johnnie.

Johnnie meanwhile has been plotting new ways of raising money. Going with Lina to her parents for Christmas, he gets her father to perform a trick which is too much for the old man's weak heart. His death means that Lina comes into her inheritance and Johnnie thus has access to improved means. Later, he cons an old school friend into backing a property development and, taking his gullible partner to Paris, on a visit to a brothel pours so much brandy into him that the man dies. The money he had invested remains in Johnnie's hands.

In Johnnie's view, neither of these events counts as murder. His big project will be to murder Lina, collect her money and insurance, and not be detected. In this he is aided by Isobel Sedbusk, a writer of crime stories, who often visits their village and enjoys discussing foolproof ways of getting rid of people. She tells Johnnie that there is a common chemical which is tasteless if mixed in milk, kills instantly, and leaves no trace in the body.

Lina is driven increasingly desperate by Johnnie's interest in murder, accentuated by discovering that after years of marriage she seems to be pregnant. When she falls ill with flu, Johnnie mounts the stairs with a glass of milk which she knowingly drinks.

== About the story ==
The novel covers a period of approximately ten years: Johnnie Aysgarth's courtship of, and marriage to, Lina McLaidlaw, the disintegration of their marriage, and her imminent death – although it is uncertain if she really dies (Isobel Sedbusk's alleged deadly chemical is never named, and maybe does not exist.) The story is told almost wholly from Lina's point of view, so readers follow what she does and learn what she thinks. On the other hand, little is revealed of what Johnnie is up to, except for what Lina sees and gathers.

== Adaptations ==
The novel was adapted to film as Suspicion (1941), directed by Alfred Hitchcock. However, the inverted detective story format was eliminated, making Johnnie's murderous indiscretions merely a product of Lina's imagination. According to William L. De Andrea in Encyclopedia Mysteriosa (1994), this was because the studio, RKO Radio Pictures, was uncomfortable with the idea of having one of Hollywood's leading actors Cary Grant, who played Johnnie, being shown on screen as a devious psychopath.

Hitchcock was quoted as saying that he was forced to alter the ending of the movie. He wanted an ending similar to the climax of the novel, but the studio, more concerned with Cary Grant's "heroic" image, insisted that it be changed. Writer Donald Spoto, in his biography of Hitchcock The Dark Side of Genius, disputes Hitchcock's claim to have been over-ruled on the film's ending. Spoto claims that the first RKO treatment and memos between Hitchcock and the studio show that Hitchcock emphatically desired to make a film about a woman's fantasy life.

A 1988 American Playhouse remake stars Anthony Andrews and Jane Curtin.
