= Jury Box (game) =

1937 commercial parlor game

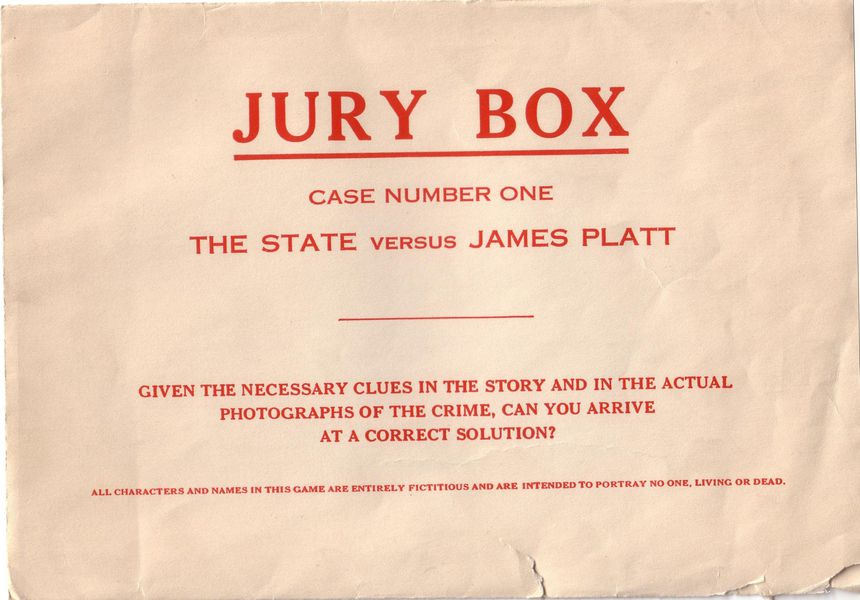
A case from the game

The Jury Box is a 1937 parlor game, created by Roy Post and published by Parker Brothers, that was popular in the United States in the late 1930s. Players are asked to solve six cases as members of a jury. The game is considered a predecessor to modern murder mystery games and role-playing games.

== Manufacturer ==
The game was manufactured in Canada by The Copp Clark CO., Limited, Toronto, under license by Parker Brothers Inc. in Salem, Massachusetts.

== Game play ==
For each case, the players act as individual members of a jury trying to determine whether the defendant is either guilty or innocent using the evidence provided to them.

One person is selected prior to the start of the game to serve as the District Attorney; this person presents the information but does not act as a member of the jury and does not accumulate points. The District Attorney is given the printed story, the photographs related to the crime, and a solution sealed in an envelope. They then read aloud the story of the crime for all the players to hear; each player can ask for any part of the story to be re-read. While the story is being read, no one is allowed to make any noise or interrupt. After that, the photographs connected to the story are handed around to each player to examine. After the story has been read and the evidence has been seen, each player will write down their solution to the case, listing the guilt or innocence of the defendant along with why they think so based on the evidence. While considering their solutions, players are not allowed to talk to each other; those violating this rule lose fifty points.

Once all the players have given their answers to the District Attorney, the correct verdict is read. Each player whose solution matches the supplied verdict will get fifty points; an additional fifty points is awarded if the correct reasoning for the solution is also given.

Each case should take around fifteen to twenty minutes to play. After all six cases have been presented and solved, the player with the most points wins.

== Contents ==
Each Jury Box board game contains packets of material on six separate cases. Every case includes a story that gives a full summary of the crime, two photographs from the crime scene, and a small envelope, labeled "Correct Verdict", which has the correct solution to the case inside it. There is also a pad of blank ballots; each player acting as a jury member gets a ballot to write their own solution to the case at hand.
