= Marie Jeanneret =

Swiss serial killer (1836–1884)

- Born: 13 January 1836; Le Locle, Switzerland
- Died: 4 April 1884 (aged 48); Geneva, Switzerland
- Penalty: 20 years

Details
- Victims: 6
- Span of crimes: 1867–1868
- Country: Switzerland
- Date apprehended: 1868

Marie Jeanneret (13 January 1836 – 4 April 1884) was a Swiss serial killer who murdered at least six people.

Jeanneret was accused of having murdered six people by poison and poisoned three other people from the end of October 1867 to mid-January 1868 on 23 November 1868. According to the criminal code of the canton of Geneva, the death penalty could be imposed for these crimes. The President of the Court was Eugène Colladon (1805–1880), the public prosecutor was William Turrettini (1810–1876). Marie Jeanneret was defended by lawyer Gaspard Zurlinden (1838–1915).

During the trial, she admitted that she had secretly administered atropine or morphine to all six of the deceased and the three other victims, although not with criminal intent, but out of medical interest in order to find out the effects of her experiments. In doing so, she did not consider the serious consequences. The jury reached a verdict that the defendant was found guilty, but under extenuating circumstances, so she was sentenced to the maximum sentence of twenty years in prison. The verdict led to the abolition of the death sentence in the canton of Geneva in 1871 after politician Marc Héridier campaigned for its abolition.

== See also ==
- List of serial killers by country
