= Suspicion (1941 film) =

1941 American film by Alfred Hitchcock

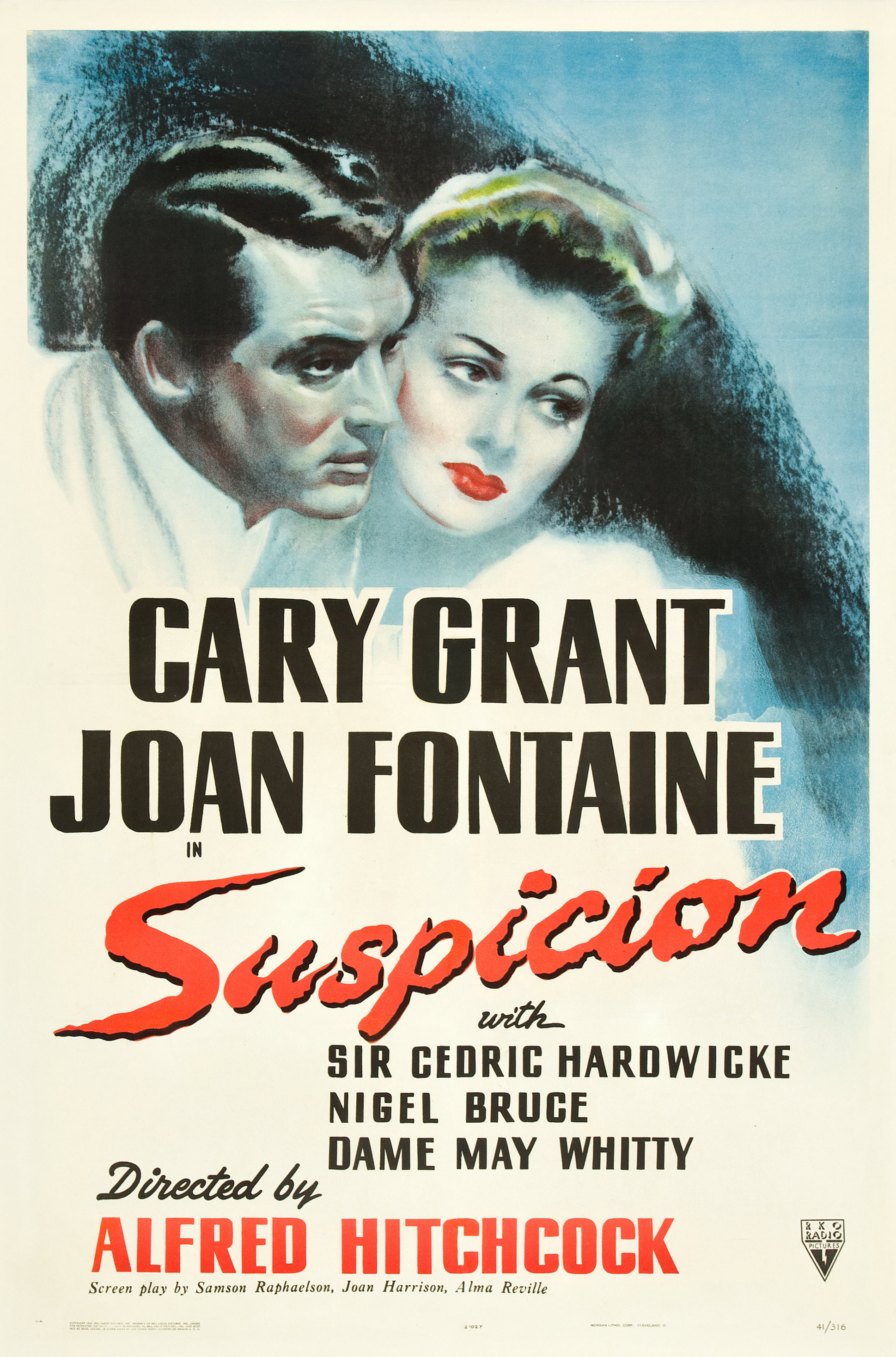
- Theatrical release poster by William Rose
- Directed by: Alfred Hitchcock
- Screenplay by: Samson Raphaelson; Joan Harrison; Alma Reville
- Based on: Before the Fact; 1932 novel by Francis Iles
- Produced by: Alfred Hitchcock; Harry E. Edington
- Starring: Cary Grant; Joan Fontaine; Sir Cedric Hardwicke; Nigel Bruce; Dame May Whitty
- Cinematography: Harry Stradling Sr.
- Edited by: William Hamilton
- Music by: Franz Waxman
- Production company: RKO Radio Pictures
- Distributed by: RKO Radio Pictures
- Release date: November 14, 1941
- Running time: 99 minutes
- Country: United States
- Language: English
- Budget: $1.1 million
- Box office: $4.5 million

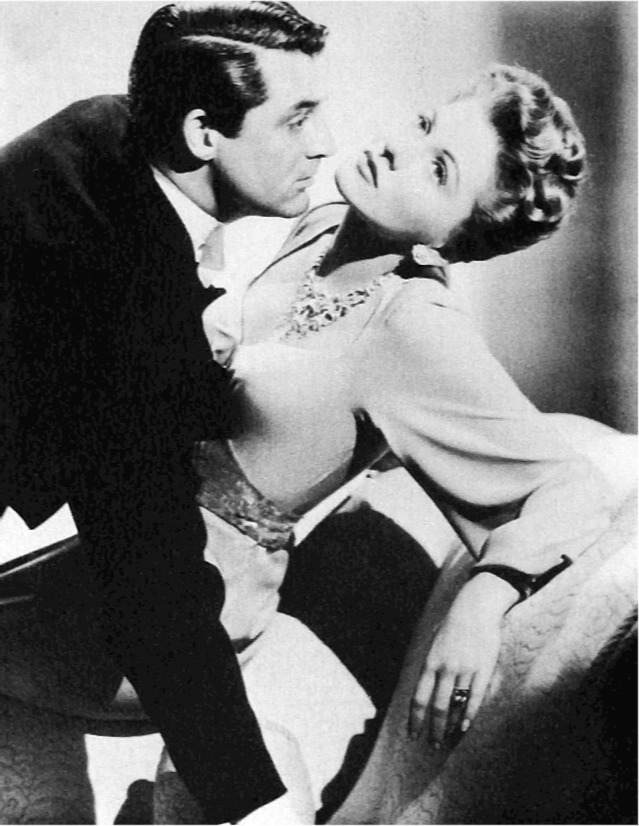
Cary Grant and Joan Fontaine

Suspicion is a 1941 American romantic psychological thriller film noir directed by Alfred Hitchcock, and starring Cary Grant and Joan Fontaine as a married couple. It also features Sir Cedric Hardwicke, Nigel Bruce, Dame May Whitty, Isabel Jeans, Heather Angel, and Leo G. Carroll. The film was inspired by the Francis Iles's 1932 novel Before the Fact.

For her role as Lina, Joan Fontaine won the Academy Award for Best Actress in 1941, making it the only Oscar-winning acting performance in an Alfred Hitchcock film. In the film, a romantically inexperienced woman marries a charming playboy after initially rejecting him. He turns out to be penniless, a gambler, and dishonest in the extreme. She comes to suspect that he is also a murderer, and that he is attempting to kill her.

== Plot ==
In 1938, handsome, irresponsible playboy Johnnie Aysgarth meets bespectacled Lina McLaidlaw on a train in England and later persuades her to take a walk with him. She is defensive and suspects his motives; he insults her in a ploy to create familiarity. But later, at a window, she overhears her parents talking about her. They assume she will never marry, and hurt by this, she kisses Johnnie.

She hopes to hear from him but he cancels their afternoon date and then vanishes. However, he returns for a hunt ball a week later and charms her into eventually eloping despite the strong disapproval of her wealthy father, General McLaidlaw. After a lavish honeymoon and returning to an extravagant house, Lina discovers that Johnnie has no job and no income, habitually lives on borrowed money, and was intending to try to sponge off her father. She talks him into getting a job, and he goes to work for his cousin, estate agent Captain Melbeck.

Gradually, Lina learns that Johnnie has continued to gamble wildly, despite promising to quit, and that to pay a gambling debt, he sold two antique chairs (family heirlooms) that her father had given her as a wedding present. Beaky, Johnnie's good-natured but naive friend, tries to reassure Lina that her husband is a lot of fun and a highly entertaining liar. She repeatedly catches Johnnie in ever more significant lies, discovering that he was fired weeks before for embezzling from Melbeck, who says he will not prosecute if the money is repaid.

Lina writes a letter to Johnnie that she is leaving him but then tears it up. After this Johnnie enters the room and shows her a telegram announcing her father's death. Johnnie is severely disappointed to discover that Lina has inherited no money, only her father's portrait. He persuades Beaky to finance a hugely speculative land development scheme. Lina is afraid this is a confidence trick or worse and futilely tries to talk Beaky out of it. Johnnie overhears and angrily warns his wife to stay out of his affairs but later he calls the whole thing off.

When Beaky leaves for Paris, Johnnie accompanies him partway. Later, news reaches Lina that Beaky died in Paris. Johnnie lies to her and an investigating police inspector, saying that he (Johnnie) stayed in London. This and other details lead Lina to suspect he was responsible for Beaky's death.

Lina then begins to fear that her husband is plotting to kill her for her life insurance. He has been questioning her friend Isobel Sedbusk, a writer of mystery novels, about untraceable poisons. Johnnie brings Lina a glass of milk before bed, but she is too afraid to drink it. Needing to get away for a while, she says she will stay with her mother for a few days. Johnnie insists on driving her there. He speeds recklessly in a powerful convertible on a dangerous road beside a cliff. Lina's door unexpectedly swings open. Johnnie reaches over, his intent unclear to the terrified woman. When she shrinks from him, he stops the car.

In the subsequent confrontation, Johnnie asserts that he was actually intending to commit suicide after taking Lina to her mother's. At this time he states that he has decided that suicide is the coward's way out, and is resolved to face his responsibilities, even to the point of going to prison for the embezzlement. He reveals being in Liverpool at the time of Beaky's death, trying to borrow on Lina's life insurance policy to repay Melbeck. Her suspicions allayed, Lina asks him to go home and see it all through together. Johnnie initially refuses but eventually they turn the car around and drive away together.

== Cast ==
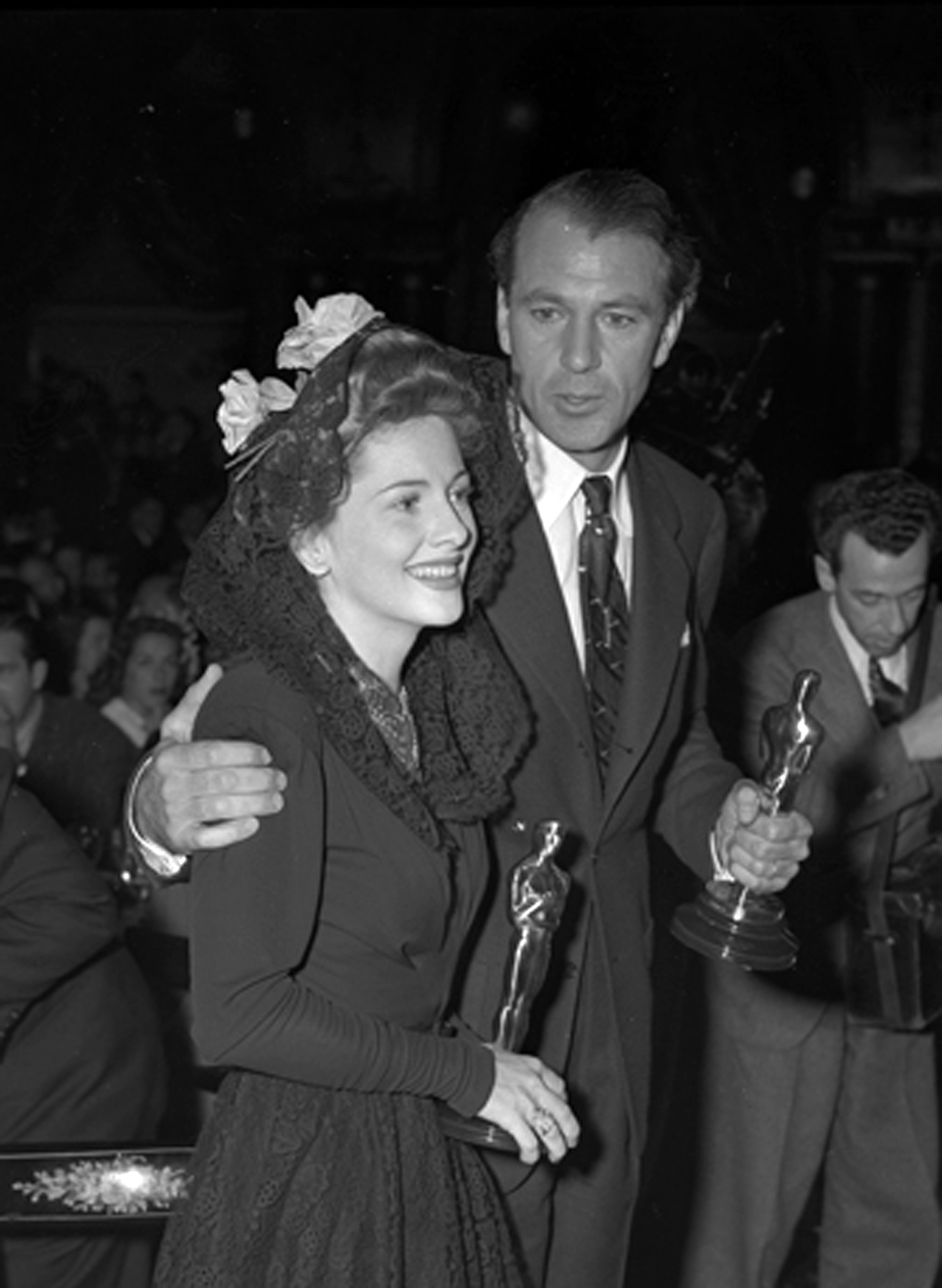
Joan Fontaine and Gary Cooper holding their Oscars at 14th Academy Awards, 1942. Fontaine won Best Actress for her role in Suspicion.

- Cary Grant as Johnnie Aysgarth
- Joan Fontaine as Lina McLaidlaw Aysgarth
- Nigel Bruce as Gordon Cochrane 'Beaky' Thwaite
- Sir Cedric Hardwicke as General McLaidlaw
- Dame May Whitty as Mrs. Martha McLaidlaw
- Isabel Jeans as Mrs. Helen Newsham, Johnnie's friend
- Heather Angel as Ethel, the Aysgarths's Maid
- Auriol Lee as Isobel Sedbusk, writer and Aysgarth's friend
- Reginald Sheffield as Reggie Wetherby, Lina's dancing partner
- Leo G. Carroll as Captain George Melbeck, Johnnie's employer and cousin

Uncredited cast members include

- Billy Bevan as Ticket Taker in train
- Leonard Carey as Burton, McLaidlaws' Butler
- Clyde Cook as Photographer
- Alec Craig as Hogarth Club Desk Clerk
- Vernon Downing as Benson, Inspector's assistant
- Gavin Gordon as Dr. Bertram Sedbusk, Isobel's brother
- Lumsden Hare as Inspector Hodgson
- Aubrey Mather as Executor of General Laidlaw's Will
- Elsie Weller, Gertrude Hoffman, and Dorothy Lloyd as Miss Wetherby
- Constance Worth as Mrs. Fitzpatrick

Alfred Hitchcock's cameo is a signature occurrence in most of his films. In Suspicion, he can be seen very briefly approximately 47 minutes into the film posting a letter at the village postbox.

== The West-Ingster screenplay ==
In November 1939, Nathanael West was hired as a screenwriter by RKO Radio Pictures, where he collaborated with Boris Ingster on a film adaptation of the novel. The two men wrote the screenplay in seven weeks, with West focusing on characterization and dialogue as Ingster worked on the narrative structure.

When RKO assigned Before the Fact to Hitchcock, he already had his own, substantially different, screenplay, credited to Samson Raphaelson, Joan Harrison, and Alma Reville. (Harrison was Hitchcock's personal assistant, and Reville was Hitchcock's wife.) West and Ingster's screenplay was abandoned and never produced. The text of this screenplay can be found in the Library of America's edition of West's collected works.

== Production ==
=== Development ===
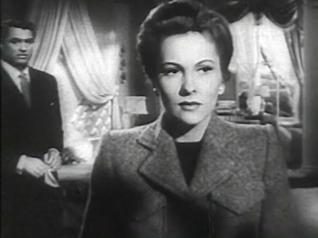
Johnnie and Lina in the film.

Suspicion illustrates how a novel's plot can be so much altered in the transition to film as to reverse the author's original intention. As William L. De Andrea states in his Encyclopedia Mysteriosa (1994), Suspicion

was supposed to be the study of a murder as seen through the eyes of the eventual victim. However, because Cary Grant was to be the killer and Joan Fontaine the person killed, the studio — RKO — decreed a different ending, which Hitchcock supplied and then spent the rest of his life complaining about.

Hitchcock was quoted as saying that he was forced to alter the ending of the movie. He wanted an ending similar to the climax of the novel, but the studio, more concerned with Cary Grant's "heroic" image, insisted that it be changed. In his biography of Hitchcock, The Dark Side of Genius, Donald Spoto disputes Hitchcock's claim to have been overruled on the film's ending. Spoto claims that the first RKO treatment and memos between Hitchcock and the studio show that Hitchcock emphatically desired to make a film about a woman's fantasy life.

As in the novel, General McLaidlaw opposes his daughter's marriage to Johnnie Aysgarth. In both versions, Johnnie freely admits that he would not mind the general's death because he expects Lina to inherit a substantial fortune, which would solve their financial problems. The book, however, is much darker, with Johnnie egging on the general to exert himself to the point where he collapses and dies. In the film, General McLaidlaw's death is only reported, and Johnnie is not involved at all. Again, Johnnie's criminal record remains incomplete.

Several scenes in the film create suspense and sow doubt as to Johnnie's intentions: Beaky's death in Paris is due to an allergy to brandy, which Johnnie knew about. A waiter who barely speaks English tells the police that Beaky addressed his companion that night as "Old Bean", the way Beaky addressed Johnnie. At the end of the film, Johnnie is driving his wife at breakneck speed to her mother's house. This scene, which takes place after her final illness, is not in the book.

The biggest difference is the ending. In Iles' novel, Johnnie serves his sick wife a drink which she knows to be poisoned, and she voluntarily gulps it down. In the film, the drink may or may not be poisoned and can be seen untouched the following morning. Another ending was considered but not used, in which Lina is writing a letter to her mother stating that she fears Johnnie is going to poison her, at which point he walks in with the milk. She finishes the letter, seals and stamps an envelope, asks Johnnie to mail the letter, then drinks the milk. The final shot would have shown him leaving the house and dropping into a mailbox the letter which incriminates him. Hitchcock's recollection of this original ending—in his book-length interview with François Truffaut, published in English as Hitchcock/Truffaut in 1967—is that Lina's letter tells her mother she knows that Johnnie is killing her, but that she loves him too much to care.

A musical leitmotif is introduced in Suspicion. Whenever Lina is happy with Johnnie — starting with a ball organised by General McLaidlaw — Johann Strauss's waltz "Wiener Blut" is played in its original, light-hearted version. At one point, when she is suspicious of her husband, a threatening, minor-key version of the waltz is employed, metamorphosing into the full and happy version after the suspense has been lifted. At another, Johnnie is whistling the waltz. At yet another, while Johnnie is serving the drink of milk, a sad version of "Wiener Blut" is played again. By placing a lightbulb in the milk, the filmmakers made the contents appear to glow as the glass is carried upstairs by Johnnie, further enhancing the audience's fear that it is poisoned.

A visual threat is inserted when Lina suspects her husband of preparing to kill Beaky: On the night before, at the Aysgarths' home, they play Anagrams, and suddenly, by exchanging a letter, Lina changes "mudder" into "murder" and then "murderer." Seeing the word, Lina looks at the flyer showing the cliffs Johnnie and Beaky plan to inspect for a real estate venture the next morning. The silhouettes of two men appear in the photograph. One pushes the other over the cliff, and we see Beaky falling and screaming. Lina faints.

If the viewer accepts Johnnie's statements in the final scene and decides that he is, for all his faults, no murderer, the film becomes a cautionary tale about the dangers of suspicion based only on assumed, incomplete, and circumstantial evidence. However, given his behaviour up to this point, it is not clear why Johnnie's assertions should be readily believed; in effect, the film leaves the viewer in a perpetual state of suspense as to what the truth is and what might happen next.

=== Casting ===
Originally, the story was intended as a B picture to star George Sanders and Anne Shirley. Then when Alfred Hitchcock became involved, the budget increased and Laurence Olivier and Frances Dee were to star. Eventually, it was decided to cast Cary Grant and Joan Fontaine. Fontaine had to be borrowed from David O. Selznick for an expensive fee; she had been dropped from RKO's contract list some years before. Grant and Fontaine had previously worked together in Gunga Din.

=== Filming ===
The film was shot entirely on sound stages between February 10 and July 24, 1941.

== Reception ==
=== Box-office ===
According to Variety, the film made $1.8 million at the box office in 1942. Suspicion earned a profit of $440,000.

=== Critical response ===
On Rotten Tomatoes, the film has a 97% approval rating based on 33 reviews, the consensus for the film reads, "Not even notorious studio meddling can diminish the craft and tantalizing suspense of Suspicion, a sly showcase for Joan Fontaine's nervy prowess and Alfred Hitchcock's flair for disquiet."

In 2016 the Los Angeles Times stated that "Many critics pegged “Suspicion” as a middling effort for the burgeoning auteur" with the ending being a point of contention, although Los Angeles Times reviewer Philip K. Scheuer stated in 1941 that the ending being "abrupt" resulted in it being "effective."

The 2016 article stated that "Even today, most aficionados place the film well into the teens when ranking Hitchcock’s 50-plus films."

== Accolades ==
| Award | Category | Nominee(s) | Result |
|---|---|---|---|
| Academy Awards | Best Picture | Alfred Hitchcock (for RKO Radio) | Nominated |
| Academy Awards | Best Actress | Joan Fontaine | Won |
| Academy Awards | Best Original Score | Franz Waxman | Nominated |
| Kinema Junpo Awards | Best Foreign Language Film | Alfred Hitchcock | Won |
| National Board of Review Awards | Best Acting | Joan Fontaine | Won |
| New York Film Critics Circle Awards | Best Actress | Joan Fontaine | Won |
| Photoplay Awards | Best Performances of the Month (December) | Cary Grant and Joan Fontaine | Won |

== Adaptations ==
During this time it was common for films to be adapted into radio plays. This film was adapted six times, from 1942 through 1949, starring the original stars and others: Once on Academy Award Theater, twice on Lux Radio Theatre and three times on Screen Guild Theater.

- Lux Radio Theatre presented the initial adaptation on May 4, 1942, a one-hour version with Joan Fontaine and Nigel Bruce, and with Brian Aherne (Fontaine's husband) in Grant's part.
- Screen Guild Theater adapted the film in a half-hour version on January 4, 1943, with Joan Fontaine and Nigel Bruce reprising their roles, while Basil Rathbone assumed Cary Grant's part (as a last-minute substitute for an ill Brian Aherne).
- Lux aired a remake on September 18, 1944, starring Olivia de Havilland (Joan Fontaine’s sister), William Powell and Charles W. Irwin.
- On January 21, 1946, Screen Guild Theater remade it with Cary Grant and Nigel Bruce reprising their roles with Loretta Young.
- CBS Radio aired a half-hour adaptation on October 30, 1946, with Cary Grant and Ann Todd on Academy Award Theater.
- On November 24, 1949, Screen Guild Theater remade it a third time, featuring all three of the original film stars; Grant, Fontaine and Bruce.

The televised 1988 American Playhouse remake starred Anthony Andrews and Jane Curtin.

== See also ==
- List of films cut over the director's opposition
- Gas Light – 1938 British thriller play by Patrick Hamilton
  - Gaslight – 1944 American film by George Cukor
- Gothic romance film – Film genre
- Rebecca – 1940 film by Alfred Hitchcock
