= Megan Dodds =

British-American actress (born 1970)

- Born: February 15, 1970 (age 56); Sacramento, California, United States
- Education: Juilliard School (BFA)
- Occupation: Actress
- Years active: 1990–present
- Spouse: Oliver J. Pearce (m. 1998)
- Children: 1 daughter

Megan L. Dodds (born February 15, 1970) is an American actress. She played Kate in the 2006 series Not Going Out, alongside Lee Mack and Tim Vine, and has appeared in the series Spooks, House, Detroit 1-8-7, and CSI: NY, and the films Ever After, The Contract, and Chatroom. Her stage work includes having played the title role in the production My Name Is Rachel Corrie (2006), which won the London Theatregoers' Choice Award for Best Actress.

== Early life ==
Megan L. Dodds was born in Sacramento, California. She graduated from Roseville High School in 1988 and then enrolled in a community college, where she was cast as Bananas in John Guare's The House of Blue Leaves. She next went to Juilliard School, where she studied for four years as a member of the Drama Division's Group 24 (1991–1995).

== Career ==
Dodds left the U.S. for London in 1997 to star in British comedian Ben Elton's play Popcorn. As a result of meeting her future husband, photographer Oliver J. Pearce, she stayed in London, about which she has said, "I love it here, I really feel like I learn a lot. There’s a lot of variety in terms of work."

=== Theatre ===
In Up for Grabs (2006, Wyndham's Theatre, London), Dodds played a technology entrepreneur, co-starring with Madonna as Mindy, Madonna's seductress, where she was described as combining "sexiness and solitude".

Dodds won the London Theatregoers' Choice Award for Best Actress in 2007 for the one woman show My Name Is Rachel Corrie, about an activist killed by an Israeli bulldozer during a 2003 demonstration in Gaza. A planned opening at the New York Theatre Workshop was cancelled in 2005.

=== Television and film ===
Dodds has appeared in television shows such as Love in a Cold Climate (2001), the BBC series Spooks (in the U.S., MI-5; 2002-2004), and Viva Blackpool. Dodds was a part of the first series cast of the BBC One sitcom, Not Going Out in 2006 as Kate, the flatmate of the lead character Lee Mack, leaving the show after the first series.

Dodds portrayed a "more conventionally beautiful" Marguerite as stepsister to Cinderella in Ever After (1998), a romance where Dodds' character is further described as "scarier than any ugly stepsisters that came before her, especially as it appears, briefly, that she has a legitimate shot at winning the prince".

== Personal life ==
After relocating to England in 1997, Dodds met Oliver J. Pearce, a fashion and advertising photographer. They married in Droitwich, Worcestershire in 1998. Their daughter was born in 2001.

== Filmography ==
=== Film ===
Megan Dodds film credits
Year	Title	Role	Ref.
1998	Ever After	Marguerite De Ghent	
2000	Urbania	Deedee	
2000	Bait	Agent Walsh	
2000	Interstate 84	Wendy	
2002	Purpose	Lisa Forrester	
2005	Festival	Dina	
2006	Free Jimmy	Claire (voice)	
2006	The Contract	Sandra	
2010	Chatroom	Grace Rollins	
2015	Oceanus: Act One	Erin Kendall	
2018	Juliet, Naked	Carrie	
2020	The Will	Josie	
2023	Wonderwell	Chlo	

=== Television ===
Megan Dodds television credits
Year	Title	Role	Notes	Ref.
1990	Midnight Caller	Crystal	Episode: "Planes"	
1998	The Rat Pack	May Britt	Television film	
2001	Love in a Cold Climate	Polly	Miniseries	
2001	Sword of Honour	Virginia	Television film	
2002–2004	Spooks	Christine Dale	Recurring role (series 1–3), 10 episodes	
2004	Agatha Christie's Poirot	Henrietta Savernake	Episode: "The Hollow"	
2005	Malice Aforethought	Madeleine Cranmere	Television film	
2006	Viva Blackpool	Kitty De-Luxe	Television film	
2006	Not Going Out	Kate	Main role (series 1)	
2006	Born Equal	Anastasia	Television film	
2008	Hotel Babylon	Katie	Episode 3.6	
2009	Lie to Me	Gail	Episode: "Depraved Heart"	
2009	House	Dr Beasley	Episode: "Broken"	
2011	Detroit 1-8-7	Jess Harkins	Recurring role, 6 episodes	
2012	Awake	Elizabeth Santoro	Episode: "Oregon"	
2012–2013	CSI: NY	Christine Whitney	Recurring role, 12 episodes	
2014	White Collar	Eva Perkins	Episode: "All's Fair"	
2019–2021	For All Mankind	Andrea Walters	Recurring role, 6 episodes	

=== Video games ===
Megan Dodds video game credits
Year	Title	Role	Notes
1995	Psychic Detective	Reporter	Voice role

== Stage ==
Year	Title	Role	Notes
1995	The School for Scandal	Maria	Lyceum Theatre, New York
1996	Ancient History/English Made Simple	Jill	Off-Broadway
1997	Popcorn	Brooke Daniels	Apollo Theatre
1999	Hamlet	Ophelia	Young Vic Theatre
1999	As You Like It	Celia	Williamstown Theatre Festival
2002	Up for Grabs	Mindy	Wyndham's Theatre
2005	This Is How It Goes	Woman	Donmar Warehouse
2006	My Name Is Rachel Corrie	Rachel Corrie	Royal Court Theatre (London, 2005-2006), The Playhouse Theatre (London, 2006), and Minetta Lane Theatre (off-Broadway, 2006); London Theatregoers' Choice Award, Best Actress winner
