= Inverted detective story =

Story where crime is shown in the beginning

An inverted detective story, occasionally known as a "reverse whodunnit" or "howcatchem", is a crime fiction structure in which the commission of the crime is shown or described at the beginning, usually including the identity of the perpetrator. The story then describes the detective's attempt to solve the mystery. There may also be subsidiary puzzles, such as why the crime was committed, which are explained or resolved during the story. This format is the opposite of the more typical "whodunit", in which all of the details of the perpetrator of the crime are not revealed until the story's climax. The first such story was R. Austin Freeman's The Case of Oskar Brodski published in Pearson's Magazine in 1912. The television series Columbo is one of the best-known examples of this genre.

== Origin ==
R. Austin Freeman described how he invented the inverted detective story in his 1912 collection of short stories The Singing Bone.

Some years ago I devised, as an experiment, an inverted detective story in two parts. The first part was a minute and detailed description of a crime, setting forth the antecedents, motives, and all attendant circumstances. The reader had seen the crime committed, knew all about the criminal, and was in possession of all the facts. It would have seemed that there was nothing left to tell. But I calculated that the reader would be so occupied with the crime that he would overlook the evidence. And so it turned out. The second part, which described the investigation of the crime, had to most readers the effect of new matter.

This was perhaps more common by the 1930s. Ngaio Marsh included a foreword on the subject in her 1935 novel Enter a Murderer.

When I showed this manuscript to my friend, Chief Detective-Inspector Alleyn of the Criminal Investigation Department, he said:

"It's a perfectly good account of the Unicorn case, but isn't it usual in detective stories to conceal the identity of the criminal?"

I looked at him coldly.

"Hopelessly vieux jeu, my dear Alleyn. Nowadays the identity of the criminal is always revealed in the early chapters."

"In that case," he said, "I congratulate you."

I was not altogether delighted.

== Examples ==
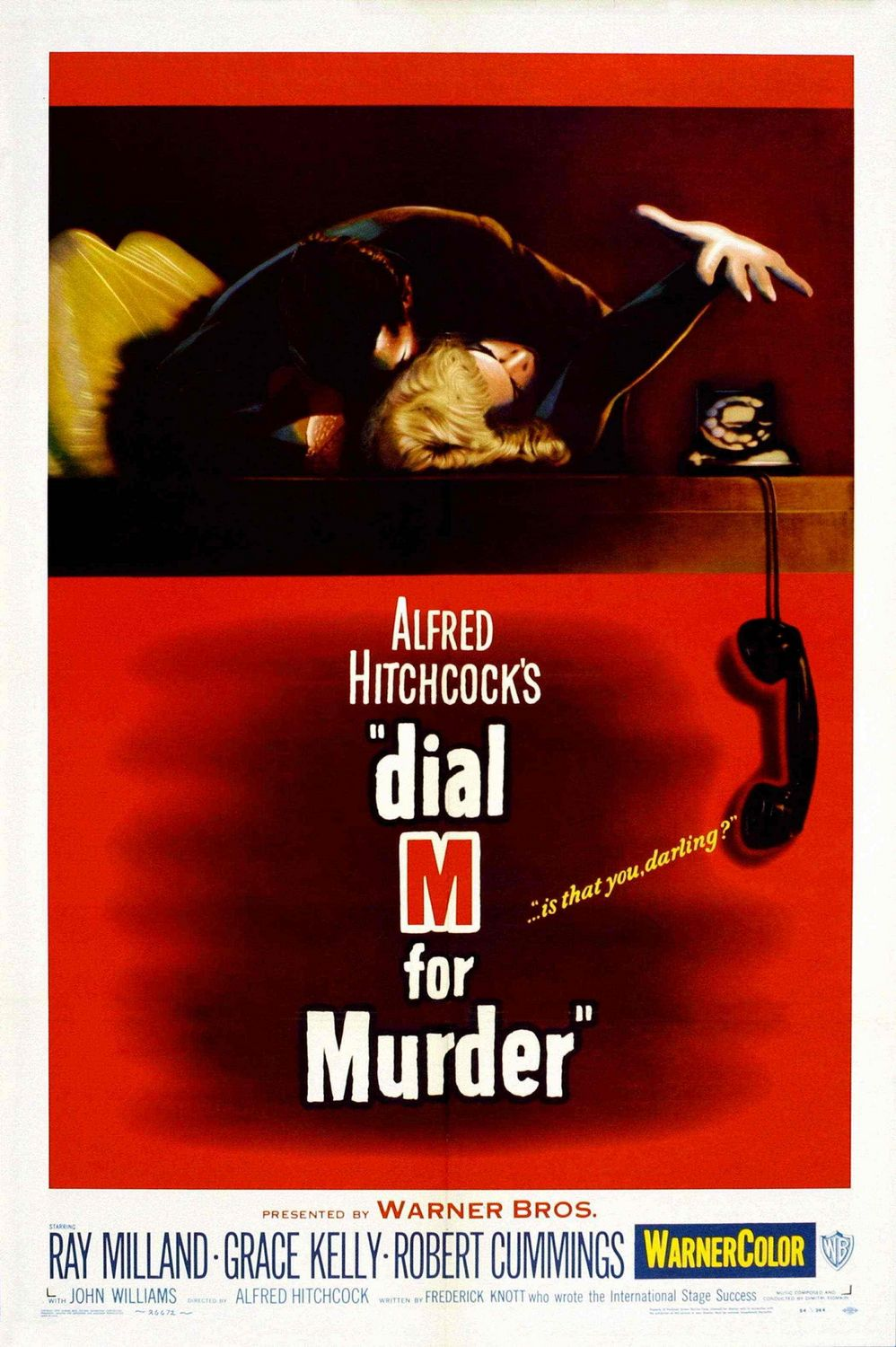
Thriller film Dial M for Murder

One early and prominent example of this subgenre is Malice Aforethought, written in 1931 by Anthony Berkeley Cox writing as Francis Iles. Freeman Wills Crofts's The 12.30 from Croydon (1934) is another important instance. The 1952 BBC television play Dial M for Murder by Frederick Knott (later adapted for the stage and then adapted again in 1954 as a theatrical film by Alfred Hitchcock) is another example. Tony Wendice outlines his plans to murder his wife Margot in the opening scenes, leaving the viewer with no questions about perpetrator or motive, only with how the situation will be resolved. In Alfred Bester's 1953 novel, The Demolished Man, the reader learns in the first chapter that Ben Reich plans to murder a man; the rest of the novel is concerned with whether he will get away with it.

The 1954 American film Dragnet uses this format as the viewer witnesses the killing of a small-time hoodlum and watches as police led by Sergeant Joe Friday work to apprehend the man's killer and the criminal leader at its heart. The short stories written by William Edward "Roy" Vickers about the Department of Dead Ends are nearly all of the inverted type. They deal with the eccentric methods used by Inspector Rason, a detective in a fictional division of Scotland Yard assigned to investigate cold cases, to solve crimes where more conventional methods have failed.

Several of the Lord Peter Wimsey novels by Dorothy Sayers, such as Unnatural Death and Strong Poison, come near to inclusion in this category. In both books, there is from the start only one real suspect, whose guilt is more or less taken for granted by the middle of the book and who indeed turns out to be the murderer. In both books—as in some other Sayers detective novels, including her last, Busman's Honeymoon, the mystery to be solved is mainly, "why did this person have any motive to commit this murder" and "how did he or she do it" (which makes this format more similar to the majority of police investigations). Also, the short story "The Abominable History of the Man with Copper Fingers" had the villain not only discovered, but dead at the beginning. Lord Peter explained his investigation in detail, complete to the villain's stumbling into a vat of cyanide-and-copper-sulphate electroplating solution.

The term "howcatchem" was coined much later, by Philip MacDonald in 1963. It later became more widely used in the 1970s, most commonly to refer to the United States television series Columbo, perhaps the best-known example of this genre. The 1989 theatrical play Over My Dead Body, by Michael Sutton and Anthony Fingleton, depicts three elderly detective story writers committing a real-life locked room murder in Rube Goldbergian fashion. The audience is in on it every step of the way. In a variation of the typical inverted form, in this case the miscreants want to be caught and made to pay their debt to society.

In the 1990s, some episodes of Diagnosis: Murder were presented in the inverted detective story format, usually when featuring a "big name" (or at least recognizable) guest star. TV shows Monk, Criminal Minds, and Law & Order: Criminal Intent have frequently featured episodes structured as inverted detective stories, in which the viewer typically witnesses the killer commit the crime (during which the killer's identity is revealed to the audience), and then watches as the detectives try to solve it. In at least one Monk episode, they had to prove that a crime has been committed. The shows have also used the whodunit format at times. The British television crime series Luther also made regular use of the inverted detective story structure.

In the manga Death Note, Light Yagami, Misa Amane, and Teru Mikami are villain protagonists, known to be killers from the start. The series chronicles L, Mello, and Near as they gradually uncover the truth. The TV show Motive uses this format exclusively (hence the title). Each episode begins with scenes introducing and revealing the killer and the victim, and the rest of the episode shows the aftermath and the investigation before revealing the circumstances surrounding the murder. The first two seasons of the TV show The Sinner can be considered an inverted detective story. In each case there are either multiple witnesses or incontrovertible physical evidence that the suspect committed the crime. Instead, the investigation involves teasing out the complicated backstory and motives for the crime. Both Poker Face and Elsbeth are modern takes on the genre. The visual novel series Ace Attorney follows a mixture of this and the traditional whodunnit formula, depending on the episode. The first episode of each game usually shows the killer in a cutscene before the case begins, with later episodes shifting towards the killer's identity needing to be found.

== See also ==
- Caper story, a related subgenre
