= Anthony Berkeley Cox =

English crime writer (1893–1971)

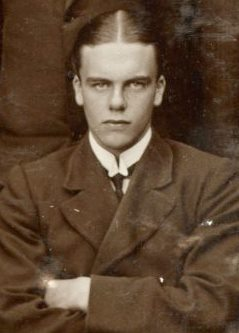
- Anthony Berkeley Cox at Sherborne School in 1911
- Born: 5 July 1893; Watford, England
- Died: 9 March 1971 (aged 77)
- Other names: Francis Iles, Anthony Berkeley and A. Monmouth Platts
- Occupation: crime writer

Anthony Berkeley Cox (5 July 1893 – 9 March 1971) was an English crime writer. He wrote under several pen-names, including Francis Iles, Anthony Berkeley and A. Monmouth Platts. He was a founder of the Detection Club, and his novel Before the Fact (1932) was filmed as the Alfred Hitchcock classic Suspicion (1941).

== Early life and education ==
Anthony Berkeley Cox was born 5 July 1893 at Watford, son of medical practitioner Dr Alfred Edward Cox (1861–1936), of Monmouth House and The Platts, two adjoining properties on Watford High Street, and Sybil Maud (died 1924), née Iles, who ran a school at Monmouth House. His paternal grandfather was a Derby wine merchant. Cox had two younger siblings: Stephen Henry Johnson Cox (1899–1960), who became a schoolmaster, and Cynthia Cicely Cox (born 1897).

With his brother, Cox was educated at Rose Hill School, Banstead, Surrey, and from the age of 14 was educated at Sherborne School and then University College, Oxford.

== Career ==
As an ex-cadet of the Officer Training Corps, Cox was commissioned as a temporary second lieutenant in the British Army on 19 September 1914. He was promoted to temporary lieutenant on 4 November 1915. He served in 7th Battalion of the Northamptonshire Regiment during the First World War. He suffered from a gas attack in France, which caused long-term damage to his health. Following the attack, he was invalided back to England and then worked a number of desk jobs for the Army. On 15 April 1919, he was transferred to the unemployed list, therefore ending his military service.

Following the war, he worked as a journalist for many years, contributing to such magazines as Punch and The Humorist.

His first novel, The Layton Court Mystery, was published anonymously in 1925. It introduced Roger Sheringham, the amateur detective who features in many of the author's novels including the classic Poisoned Chocolates Case. In 1930, Berkeley founded the Detection Club in London along with Agatha Christie, Freeman Wills Crofts and other established mystery writers.

His 1932 novel (as "Francis Iles"), Before the Fact was adapted into the 1941 classic film Suspicion, directed by Alfred Hitchcock, starring Cary Grant and Joan Fontaine. Trial and Error was turned into the unusual 1941 film Flight from Destiny starring Thomas Mitchell.

He was a friend of E. M. Delafield and they each dedicated a book to the other (Jill and The Wychford Poisoning Case). She gently ragged him in her Provincial Lady Goes Further by having people tell her that "Francis Iles" is really Aldous Huxley or Edith Sitwell. The opening sentence of Malice Aforethought has been described as "immortal": "It was not until several weeks after he had decided to murder his wife that Doctor Bickleigh took any active steps in the matter."

In 1938, he took up book reviewing for John O'London's Weekly and The Daily Telegraph, writing under his pen name Francis Iles. He also wrote for the Sunday Times in the 1940s and for the Manchester Guardian (later The Guardian) from the mid-1950s until 1970. A key figure in the development of crime fiction, he died in 1971 in St John's Wood, London. His estate was valued at £196,917 (£2,321,878 in 2023).

== Bibliography ==
=== Published as Anthony Berkeley ===
==== Roger Sheringham ====
- The Layton Court Mystery (Herbert Jenkins, 1925) (Published as by "?")
- The Wychford Poisoning Case (Collins, 1926) (published as by "The Author of "The Layton Court Mystery"")
- Roger Sheringham and the Vane Mystery [US title: The Mystery at Lovers' Cave] (1927)
- The Silk Stocking Murders (1928)
- The Poisoned Chocolates Case (1929)
- The Second Shot (1930)
- Top Storey Murder (1931)
- Murder in the Basement (1932)
- Jumping Jenny [US title: Dead Mrs. Stratton] (1933)
- Panic Party [US title: Mr Pidgeon's Island] (1934)
- The Roger Sheringham Stories (1994); limited edition of 95 copies: The Avenging Chance, White Butterfly, Perfect Alibi, The Wrong Jar, Mr Bearstowe Says..., The Body's Upstairs (a brief parody), Double Bluff, Razor-Edge and Red Anemones (These are earlier versions of "Mr. Bearstowe Says...". "Red Anemones" is a radio script.), Temporary Insanity (a stage play adapted from The Layton Court Mystery, Direct Evidence (an earlier version of "Double Bluff")
- The Avenging Chance and Other Mysteries from Roger Sheringham's Casebook (2004); 2nd edition with an additional story, Crippen & Landru, 2015: The Avenging Chance, White Butterfly, Perfect Alibi, The Wrong Jar, Mr Bearstowe Says..., The Body's Upstairs(a brief parody), Double Bluff, The Mystery of Horne's Copse, Unsound Mind, The Bargee's Holiday (First published Diss Express, 5 February 1943)

==== Other novels ====
- Professor On Paws (1926)
- Mr Priestley's Problem (first published as by A.B. Cox) [US title: The Amateur Crime] (1927)
- The Piccadilly Murder (1929)
- The Floating Admiral (1931) (written in collaboration with eleven members of the Detection Club)
- Trial and Error (1937)
- Not to Be Taken [US title: A Puzzle in Poison] (1938)
- Death in the House (1939)
- The Scoop and Behind the Screen (1983) (Originally published in The Listener (1931) and (1930), both written by members of the Detection Club)

==== Uncollected short stories ====
- "Mr Simpson Goes to the Dogs" (1934)
- "The Policeman Only Taps Once" (1936)
- "Publicity Heroine" (1936)
- "Hot Steel" (Sheringham)

=== Published as Francis Iles ===
==== Novels ====
- Malice Aforethought (1931). Serialised, Daily Express, 1931
- Before the Fact (1932). Serialised, Daily Express, 1932
- As for the Woman (1939)

==== Short stories ====
- "Outside the Law" (1934)
- "Dark Journey" (1935)
- "It Takes Two to Make a Hero'" (1943)

==== True crime essays ====
- "The Rattenbury Case" (1936)

=== Published as A. Monmouth Platts ===
- Cicely Disappears (1927) (Also known as The Wintringham Mystery)

=== Published as A. B. Cox ===
- Brenda Entertains (1925)
- Jugged Journalism (1925)
