= Chain novel =

Collaboratively-written fiction

A chain novel or chain story is a type of collaborative fiction written collectively by a group of authors. The novel is passed along from author to author, each adding a new chapter or section to the work, with the rule that each subsequent chapter or section should elaborate and follow the plotline of preceding chapters or sections.

The story continues through the participation of others; no one knows what happens next except the next person to add to the story. This method of writing is a shared project and often leads in unexpected directions. This collaborative effort is used to stimulate creativity and the exploration of new ideas.

One problem with chain stories is they can become long and complicated due to the number of different people adding new bits and twists.

Legal theorist Ronald Dworkin has compared common law jurisprudence to chain novels by suggesting that judges, like chain novel authors, must elaborate and follow the laws set before them.

== Teaching method ==
Chain stories can also be used as an experimental teaching method, particularly in language learning. In a "chain game," each player adds their own link to the story chain in the form of letters, words, or sentences.

== Examples ==
- The Floating Admiral, a 1931 detective novel which was written consecutively by 13 notable authors including Agatha Christie, Dorothy L. Sayers, Anthony Berkeley, G.K. Chesterton and Canon Victor Whitechurch, with each of the authors providing their own suggested solution to the mystery as an epilogue.
- Wicked and Deadly, Australian children's fiction by Paul Jennings and Morris Gleitzman who took turns writing chapters, and then sending them on to the other.

== See also ==
- Exquisite corpse, a method by which a collection of words or images is collectively assembled
- Mosaic novel, a novel where individual chapters or short stories share a common setting or set of characters with the aim of telling a linear story from beginning to end, with the individual chapters, however, refracting a plurality of viewpoints and styles
- Short story collection
- Chain writing, relay writing technique
