= Detection Club =

Group of British mystery writers founded in 1930

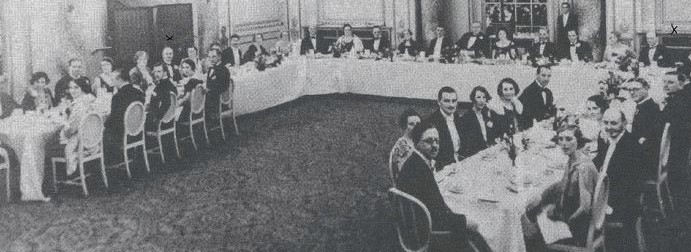
The Detection Club meeting in 1932, when G. K. Chesterton was its President

The Detection Club was formed in 1930 by a group of British mystery writers, including Agatha Christie, Dorothy L. Sayers, Ronald Knox, Freeman Wills Crofts, Arthur Morrison, Hugh Walpole, John Rhode, Jessie Louisa Rickard, Baroness Orczy, R. Austin Freeman, G. D. H. Cole, Margaret Cole, E. C. Bentley, Henry Wade, Constance Lindsay Taylor and H. C. Bailey. Anthony Berkeley Cox was instrumental in setting up the club, and the first president was G. K. Chesterton. There is a fanciful initiation ritual with an oath written by Sayers, and the club holds regular dinner meetings in London.

== Guidelines ==
In addition to meeting for dinners and helping each other with technical aspects in their individual writings, the members of the club agreed to adhere to Knox's Commandments in their writing to give the reader a fair chance at guessing the guilty party. These fair-play "rules" were summarised by one of the members, Ronald Knox, in an introduction to an anthology of detective stories. They were never intended as more than guidelines, and not all the members took them seriously. The first American member (though then living in the UK) was John Dickson Carr, elected in 1936.

The club continues to exist, although the fair-play rules have been considerably relaxed.

A number of works were published under the club's sponsorship; most of these were written by multiple members of the club, each contributing one or more chapters in turn. In the case of The Floating Admiral, each author also provided a sealed "solution" to the mystery as he or she had written it, including the previous chapters. This was done to prevent a writer from adding impossible complications with no reasonable solution in mind. The various partial solutions were published as part of the final book.

== Initial membership ==
The founding members of the club in 1930 were H. C. Bailey, E. C. Bentley, Anthony Berkeley, G. K. Chesterton, Agatha Christie, G. D. H. Cole, Margaret Cole, J.J. Connington, Freeman Wills Crofts, Clemence Dane, Robert Eustace, R. Austin Freeman, Lord Gorell, Edgar Jepson, Ianthe Jerrold, Milward Kennedy, Ronald Knox, A. E. W. Mason, A. A. Milne, Arthur Morrison, Baroness Orczy, John Rhode, Jessie Rickard, Dorothy L. Sayers, Helen Simpson, Constance Lindsay Taylor, Henry Wade, Victor Whitechurch and Hugh Walpole.

Over the following two decades further members were elected to the club: Anthony Gilbert (1933), E. R. Punshon (1933), Gladys Mitchell (1933), Margery Allingham (1934), Norman Kendal (1935), R.C. Woodthorpe (1935), John Dickson Carr (1936), Cecil Day-Lewis (1937), Muna Lee (1937), Maurice Guinness (1937), E.C.R. Lorac (1937), Christopher Bush (1937), Cyril Hare (1946), Christianna Brand (1946), Richard Hull (1946), Alice Campbell (1946), Val Gielgud (1947), Edmund Crispin (1947), Dorothy Bowers (1948), Douglas G. Browne (1949), Michael Innes (1949), Michael Gilbert (1949) and Mary Fitt (1950).

Membership was initially limited to those considered to be writing pure detective novels, rather than mystery thrillers. This began to change when Eric Ambler, known for his thrillers and spy novels, was elected in 1952. Several notable detective writers including Philip MacDonald and Josephine Tey were never invited to join the club, while Georgette Heyer who wrote detective stories alongside her better-known regency novels turned down an invitation. Daily Express columnist Nancy Spain was considered for membership but was rejected. Future president Julian Symons was initially rejected before eventually being admitted in 1951. Ngaio Marsh, a major figure in detective writing, only joined later in life.

Subsequent members of the Club included Andrew Garve, H. R. F. Keating and John Bingham. Martin Edwards charted the early history of the Club in his 2015 book The Golden Age of Murder.

== The oath ==
Do you promise that your detectives shall well and truly detect the crimes presented to them using those wits which it may please you to bestow upon them and not placing reliance on nor making use of Divine Revelation, Feminine Intuition, Mumbo Jumbo, Jiggery-Pokery, Coincidence or Act of God?

== Presidents ==
- G. K. Chesterton (1930–1936)
- E. C. Bentley (1936–1949)
- Dorothy L. Sayers (1949–1957)
- Agatha Christie (1957–1976)
- Lord Gorell (1957–1963)
- Julian Symons (1976–1985)
- H. R. F. Keating (1985–2000)
- Simon Brett (2000–2015)
- Martin Edwards (2015–)

Lord Gorell shared the presidency with Agatha Christie, who only agreed to accept the role if a co-president was appointed to conduct the club's proceedings.

== Publications ==
- The Scoop and Behind the Screen (1931, round-robin novellas)
- The Floating Admiral (1931,1932, round-robin novel)
- Ask a Policeman (1933)
- The Anatomy of a Murder (1936) (US title The Anatomy of Murder (New York, Macmillan, 1937) True crime essays
- Detection Medley (1939; US title, Line-Up, 1940; short stories, some original, some reprints; edited by John Rhode)
- Mystery Playhouse presents The Detection Club (January 1948); six 30 minute radio plays by club members on BBC Light Programme written in aid of club funds
- No Flowers By Request (round-robin novella, 1953)
- Verdict of Thirteen (1978; original short stories, edited by Julian Symons, published by Faber and by Harper & Row)
- The Man Who... (1992); original short stories in honor of Julian Symons's 80th birthday, edited by H. R. F. Keating, published by Macmillan])
- The Detection Collection (2005; original short stories in recognition of the club's 75th anniversary, edited by Simon Brett, published by Orion and by St. Martin;'s (2006))
- The Verdict of Us All (2006; original short stories in honor of H. R. F. Keating's 80th birthday, edited by Peter Lovesey, published by Crippen & Landru and Allison & Busby)
- The Sinking Admiral (2016, round-robin novel, published by Collins Crime Club)
- Motives for Murder (2016; original short stories in honor of Peter Lovesey's 80th birthday, edited by Martin Edwards, published by Crippen & Landru and by Sphere (Little, Brown Book Group).
- Howdunit: A Masterclass in Crime Writing by Members of the Detection Club (2020; edited by Martin Edwards, published by Collins Crime Club).
- Eric the Skull (2020; a 45-minute BBC Radio 4 play, being a fictionalised account of the setting up of the club, written by Simon Brett and produced by Liz Anstee).
- Playing Dead (2025; original short stories in honor of Simon Brett's 80th birthday, edited by Martin Edwards, published by Severn House Publishers)
