= Protagonize =

Defunct creative writing website

- Website type: Writing, Creative
- Available in: Multilingual
- Owner: tauntmedia
- Website: www.protagonize.com
- Commercial: Commercial
- Users: 29,000
- Launched: December, 2007
- Current status: Offline
- Content license: Creative Commons Attribution-Noncommercial-Share Alike 3.0 License

Protagonize was an online creative writing community based in Vancouver, BC, Canada. It was established in late December 2007. It was owned and operated by Taunt Media. The site catered to both amateur and experienced authors interested in online collaborative creative writing, and in 2016, was home to over 43,800 works (pieces of writing) and 160,800 pages, and over 29,000 members from around the world. On June 3, 2017, Protagonize closed down due to stagnant user growth and declining revenue from advertising and donations. The current domain redirects to a blog page explaining the shutdown.

== History ==
Protagonize is an online community and self-publishing platform, launched in December, 2007 by creator Nick Bouton as a home for Choose Your Own Adventure-style branching stories. Shortly after launch, the site began to allow for linear narrative as well, and has since expanded to include poetry, screenplays, and other forms of literature.

Following its subsequent growth, there has been an increasing focus on the community aspect of the site, with features such as groups and writing circles being added.

In June 2008 Protagonize was selected as a finalist in the 2008 Canadian New Media Awards for "Excellence in Social Media Websites".

In June 2009 Protagonize was one of seven local BC startups chosen to demo at Launch Party Vancouver 7 as part of the Startup Most Likely to Succeed competition.

At least one published book started out life as a story on Protagonize.

On June 3, 2017, Protagonize closed down due to stagnant user growth and declining revenue from advertising and donations.

== See also ==
- Addventure
- Collaborative fiction
- Interactive fiction
- Online book
- Serials
