= The Book Game =

2025 novel by Frances Wise

The Book Game is a 2025 novel by Frances Wise.

Frances Wise is the collaborative pseudonym of Chloë Houston and Adam Smyth. Houston is professor of early modern drama and joint Head of the Department of English Literature at the University of Reading, and Smyth is professor of English Literature and the History of the Book at Balliol College, University of Oxford. The Book Game is their first collaborative fiction novel.

The Book Game narrates events at a week-long writing retreat in Cambridge in the summer of 2022. The novel was chosen by The Spectator as one of the books of the year for 2025. Writing in the Sunday Telegraph, Luiza Sauma described the novel as 'a crowd-pleasing bestseller'.
