= Denis Rolleston Gwynn =

Irish journalist, writer and historian

- Born: 6 March 1893; Dublin, Ireland
- Died: 10 April 1971 (aged 78); Malahide, Ireland
- Occupation: Non-fiction writer

Academic background
- Education: University Cork College

Academic work
- Discipline: Modern Irish history
- Institutions: University College Dublin

Denis Rolleston Gwynn (6 March 1893 – 10 April 1971) was an Irish journalist, writer and professor of modern Irish history. He served in the British Army in World War I.

== Life ==
Denis Gwynn was born on 6 March 1893, the third son of Stephen Gwynn, the Irish patriot, writer and Irish Parliamentary Party Member of Parliament. His mother was Mary ('May') Louisa Osborn Gwynn; his parents were first cousins. The middle name Rolleston was derived from Denis Gwynn's great-grandmother Catherine Rolleston, who married his great grandfather John Gwynne.

Along with his mother and siblings, but not his father, Denis Gwynn was received into the Roman Catholic Church in 1902. He was educated at St. Enda's School Rathfarnham, Clongowes Wood College and at University College Dublin where he graduated BA (1914), MA (1915) and D.Litt. (1932).

During World War I, in 1916, Gwynn enlisted in the Royal Munster Fusiliers. He served on the Western Front in France from 1916 to 1917, but was then invalided home and worked for the remainder of the war at the British Ministry of Information.

After the war, Gwynn worked as a journalist. He became assistant editor of the periodical Everyman in London, joined the National Press Agency, and worked for a while as a reporter in Brittany and Paris, then in 1922 returned to London where he was active for many years as a journalist specialising in Irish Catholic issues. He was on the editorial staff of the Westminster Gazette and edited the Dublin Review from 1933 to 1939.

During World War II Gwynn retired to the Hampshire countryside and became a farmer.

In 1948 Gwynn returned to Ireland and took up the post of research professor of Modern Irish History at University College Cork. He remained in this post until his retirement in 1962. Professor Gwynn also acted as editor of the Cork University Press (1954–1962) and wrote a regular column called Now and Then in the Cork Examiner. He wrote several works of history and biography and was a contributor to Encyclopedia Britannica.

In 1963, Denis Gwynn married Alice McEnery (née Trudeau) (1904–1991), born in Chicago, the only daughter of Dr Edward Livingston Trudeau Jnr and painter Hazel Martyn, an American beauty who later became the wife and muse of Irish artist John Lavery. For many years Hazel Lavery's face, as drawn by Lavery, featured on Irish banknotes. Alice's paternal grandfather was Edward Livingston Trudeau (1848–1915) an American physician and public health pioneer who helped to establish principles for disease prevention and control, particularly for tuberculosis.

Denis Gwynn died at his home in Malahide, County Dublin, on 10 April 1971 and was buried at Stamullen Cemetery, County Meath.

== Literary Connection ==
The novelist Jessie Victor Rickard lived the final years of her life, until her death in 1963, at Denis Gwynn's house in Montenotte, Cork. Jessie Rickard was a close friend of Alice Gwynn.

== Works ==
- The Catholic Reaction in France, New York: The Macmillan Company, (1924).
- The Irish Free State, 1922–1927, London: Macmillan and Company Limited, (1928).
- The Struggle for Catholic Emancipation (1750–1829), London: Longman's Green, (1928),online
- A Hundred Years of Catholic Emancipation], London: Longman Green and Co., (1929).
- Daniel O’Connell, the Irish Liberator (1929)
- The Life and death of Roger Casement (1930)
- Edward Martyn and the Irish revival (1930)
- John Keogh: the pioneer of Catholic Emancipation (1930) (1934)
- Daniel O’Connell and Ellen Courtney (1930)
- The Life of John Redmond (1932)
- De Valera (1933)
- The O'Gorman Mahon (1934)
- The Vatican and the War in Europe (1940)
- William Smith O'Brien (1946)
- Young Ireland and 1848 (1949)
- Cardinal Wiseman (1950)
- The history of Partition (1950)

== Biographical sources ==
- A Dictionary of Irish History since 1800, D. J. Hickey & J. E. Doherty, Gill & MacMillan (1980)
- A Biographical Dictionary of Cork, Tim Cadogan & Jeremiah Falvey (2006), p. 117
