= Chain story =

Chain story may refer to:

- Chain novel
- Cumulative tale
