= Hazel Lavery =

American painter (1890–1935)

Hazel Lady Lavery
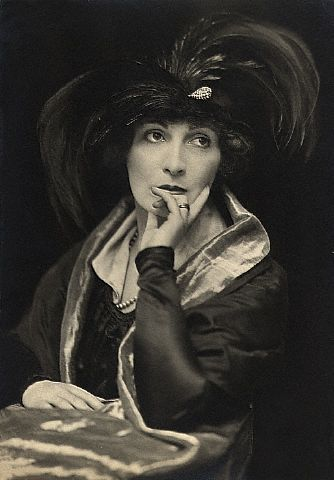
- Born: Hazel Martyn; 14 March 1880; Chicago, Illinois, U.S.
- Died: 3 January 1935 (aged 54); London, England, UK
- Spouses: Edward Livingston Trudeau Jr. (m. 1903; died 1904) Sir John Lavery (m. 1909)

Hazel Lavery, Lady Lavery (née Martyn; 1880–1935) was an American painter and the second wife of portrait artist Sir John Lavery. Famed for her beauty, Lavery's likeness appeared on banknotes of Ireland for much of the 20th century.

== Early life ==
Born in Chicago on 14 March 1880, Hazel Martyn was the daughter of Edward Jenner Martyn, a wealthy industrialist of Irish descent. A contemporary account refers to young Hazel Martyn as "The Most Beautiful Girl in the Midwest". Hazel had one sister, Dorothea Hope "Dorothy" Martyn (1887–1911), who was an aspiring playwright. Suffering from anorexia nervosa, Dorothy died in 1911 aged 23, and it was her death that spurred Hazel to leave America.

== Personal life ==
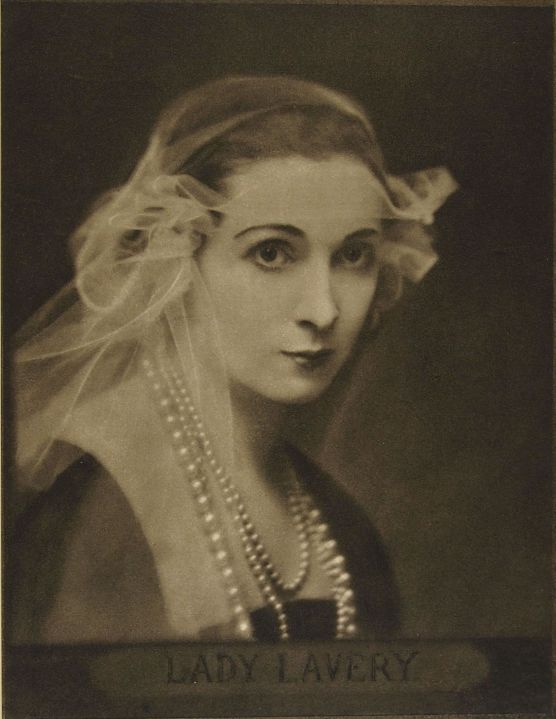
Lady Lavery, from The Book of Fair Women, by E. O. Hoppé, 1922

In 1903, Hazel Martyn married Edward Livingston Trudeau Jr, son of Edward Livingston Trudeau, a physician who advanced the treatment of tuberculosis. Trudeau died five months later from an embolism brought on by pneumonia. They had one daughter, Alice, born 10 October 1904 (Alice later spent much of her life in Ireland, marrying first John A. McEnery of Co. Kilkenny, then after being widowed, in 1963 she married historian Denis Rolleston Gwynn).

Hazel Martyn first met John Lavery, a Catholic-born painter, originally from Belfast whilst engaged to Trudeau. In 1909 she and Lavery married after the death of her mother who was opposed to the match. Subsequently, she became Lavery's most frequent sitter.

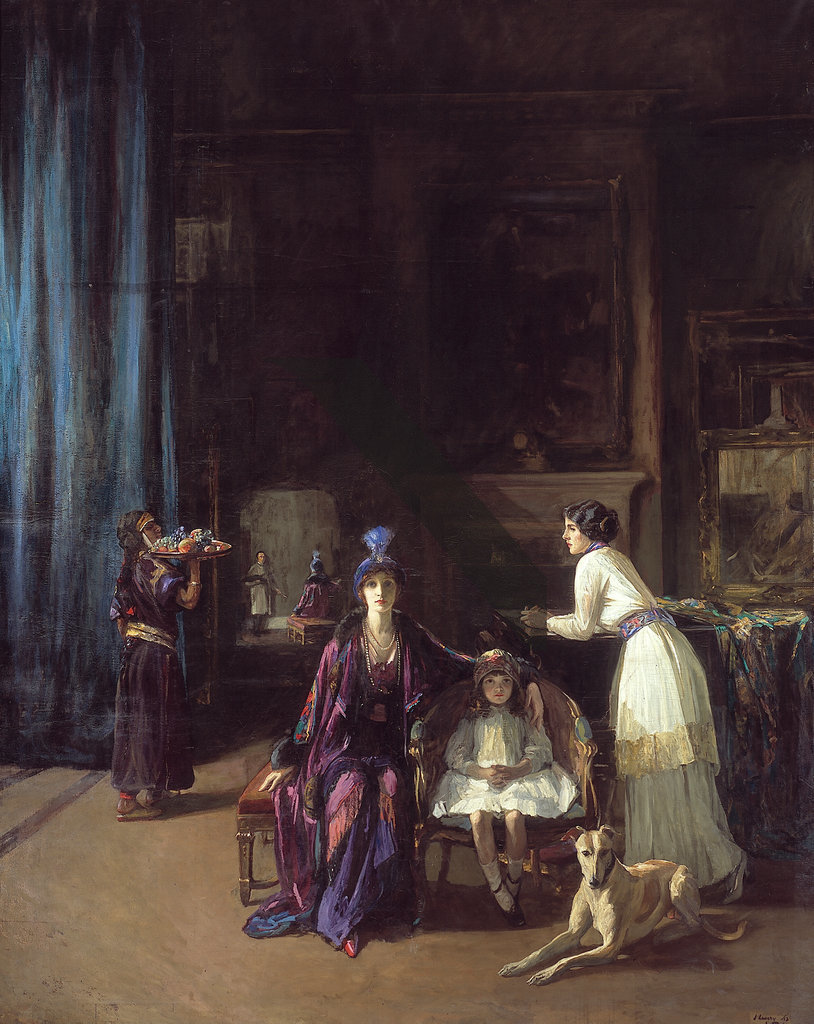
The Artist's Studio, Lady Hazel Lavery with her Daughter Alice and Stepdaughter Eileen (1910-1913

During World War I, John Lavery became an official artist for the British government. In 1918, he received a knighthood, and Hazel Lavery became Lady Lavery.

The Laverys lent their palatial house at 5 Cromwell Place in South Kensington to the Irish delegation led by Michael Collins during negotiations for the Anglo-Irish Treaty in 1921.

Hazel Lavery died of a heart attack on 3 January 1935 at her home in London, having been suffering ill health for over a year after an operation to remove a wisdom tooth, with her husband and daughter at her side.

Her funeral mass took place at the Brompton Oratory in Knightsbridge. She was buried in Putney Vale Cemetery. In Ireland, a memorial service for her took place at the request of the government.

With the outbreak of the Second World War, Sir John Lavery moved to live with his stepdaughter Alice McEnery, at Rosenarra, Kilmoganny, Co. Kilkenny, Ireland and died there in January 1941. He was initially buried at Mount Jerome Cemetery in Dublin but was reinterred next to Hazel Lavery in Putney Vale Cemetery in 1947.

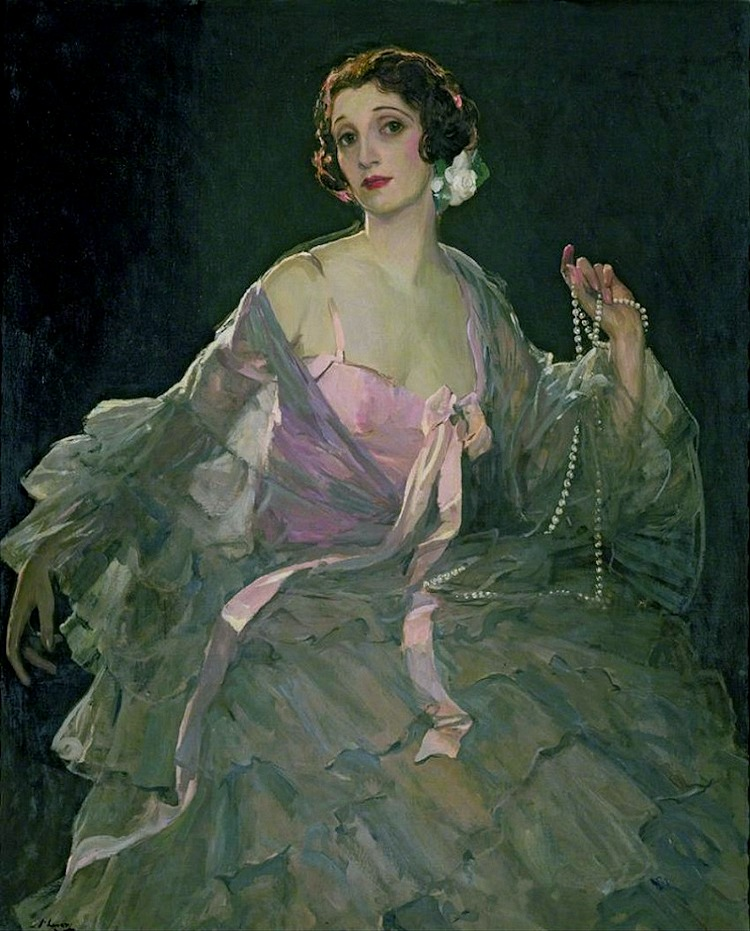
Sir John Lavery - Lady Hazel Lavery, 1922

== Irish banknotes ==
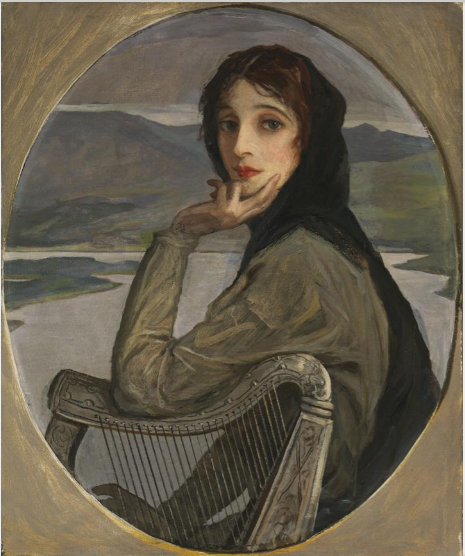
Portrait of Lady Lavery as Kathleen Ni Houlihan 1927

After the Anglo-Irish treaty, the Irish Free State government invited John Lavery to create an image of a female personification of Ireland for the new Irish banknotes. Such a personification harks back to figures in ancient Irish mythology and has been exemplified in recent centuries by women such as James Clarence Mangan's Dark Rosaleen and W. B. Yeats' Cathleen Ní Houlihan.

This personification of Ireland, modelled on Lady Lavery and painted by her husband, was reproduced on the Series A banknotes of Ireland from 1928 until the 1970s. It then appeared as a watermark on Series B and Series C notes until the latter were replaced by the euro in 2002.

== Other portraits ==
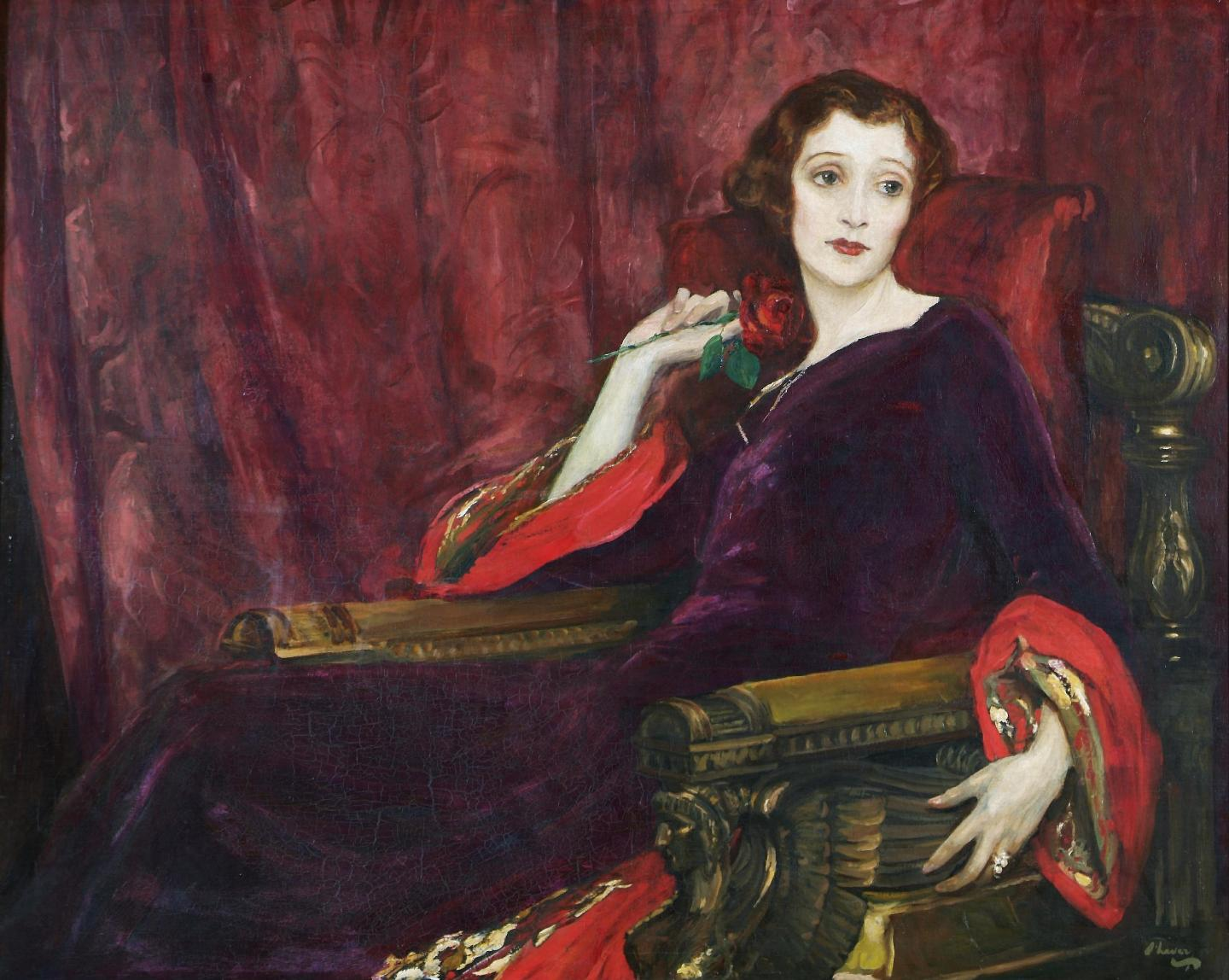
The Red Rose, 1923, Crawford Art Gallery

Lady Lavery sat for more than 400 portraits by Sir John. Many were similarly named, leading an expert to remark that "Hazel in ..." is virtually a Lavery trademark.

Lavery's biographer described "Hazel in rose and grey" as "One of the nicest of Lavery's "Hazel in" pictures. For once he abandons the full-length format and the composition gains a more curvy, dynamic appearance. Hazel, profiled by what photographers call a hair light, wears a wispy dress the colour of faded hydrangeas".

Another well-known portrait of Hazel Lavery painted by her husband is known as The Red Rose (1923). As one expert describes, this painting has a complicated history:

Her well-known face and the characteristic red, purple and gold colour harmonies make The Red Rose immediately recognizable as a portrait of her. However, the canvas was begun in 1892 as a portrait of Mrs William Burrell. In 1912 it was transformed into a portrait of Sarah Bernhardt, and in the early twenties it was, for a brief period, a portrait of Viscountess Curzon.

== Correspondence ==
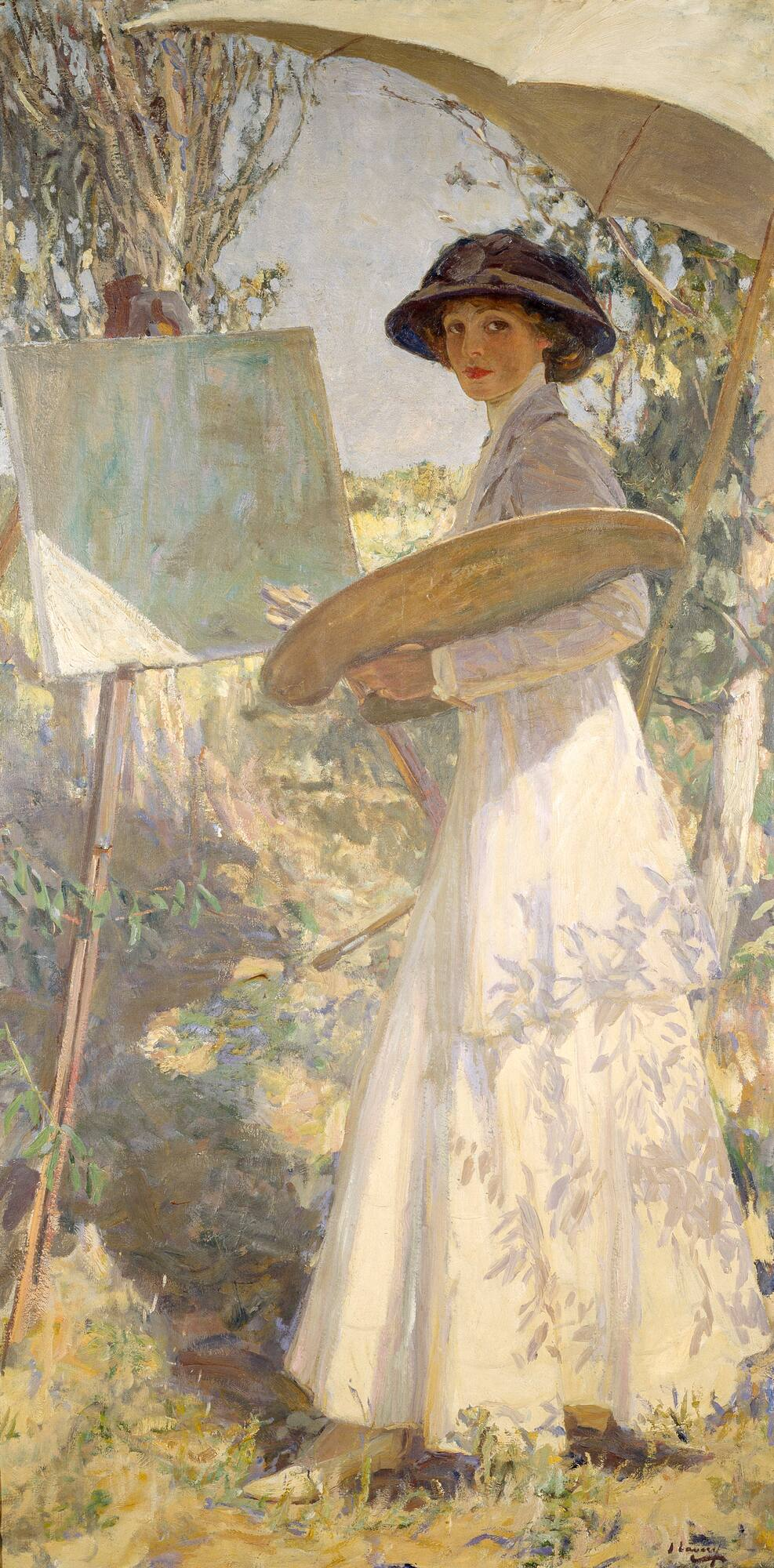
Mrs Lavery sketching, 1910, Dublin City Gallery The Hugh Lane

Lady Lavery knew many famous figures of her era and corresponded with such notable figures as Maurice Baring, Hilaire Belloc, Owen Buckmaster, Tim Healy, Shane Leslie, Reginald McKenna, Jessie Louisa Rickard, George Bernard Shaw, Lytton Strachey, Gerald Hugh Tyrwhitt-Wilson and W. B. Yeats.

This correspondence became public long after her death and reveals much about her personality and how she was regarded by her contemporaries. Amongst the events that are recounted are a visit to Ireland by the British Royal family, and her letters from Winston Churchill in which he confided in her his reservations about the creation of Northern Ireland.

== Rumoured affair ==
Other correspondents speculated about Lady Lavery's relationship with Michael Collins and Kevin O'Higgins. According to the memoirs of Derek Patmore, a writer, artist, and interior designer who was a close friend of Lady Lavery's, Collins was "the great love in her life" and that Sir Shane "told me that when Michael Collins was killed in an ambush they found a miniature of Hazel hanging around his neck with a poem Shane Leslie had written to her on the back of it".

Speculation about the relationship between Collins and Lady Lavery led a newspaper of the day to refer to her as his "sweetheart", an issue Collins wrote to his fiancé Kitty Kiernan about.

Historian Meda Ryan has cast doubts on these rumours. Ryan states that "in all the research I have done, I have found no evidence whatsoever that he had an affair with Lady Lavery". Emmet Dalton, a close associate of Collins who was with him during the period when the supposed affair happened, says he saw no evidence of an affair. Todd Andrews states that such an affair would have been against the code of conduct of the IRA and that it would not have been tolerated. Ryan also states that correspondence between Collins and Kitty Kiernan in this period shows that their relationship was solid.

== Art depicting Hazel Lavery ==
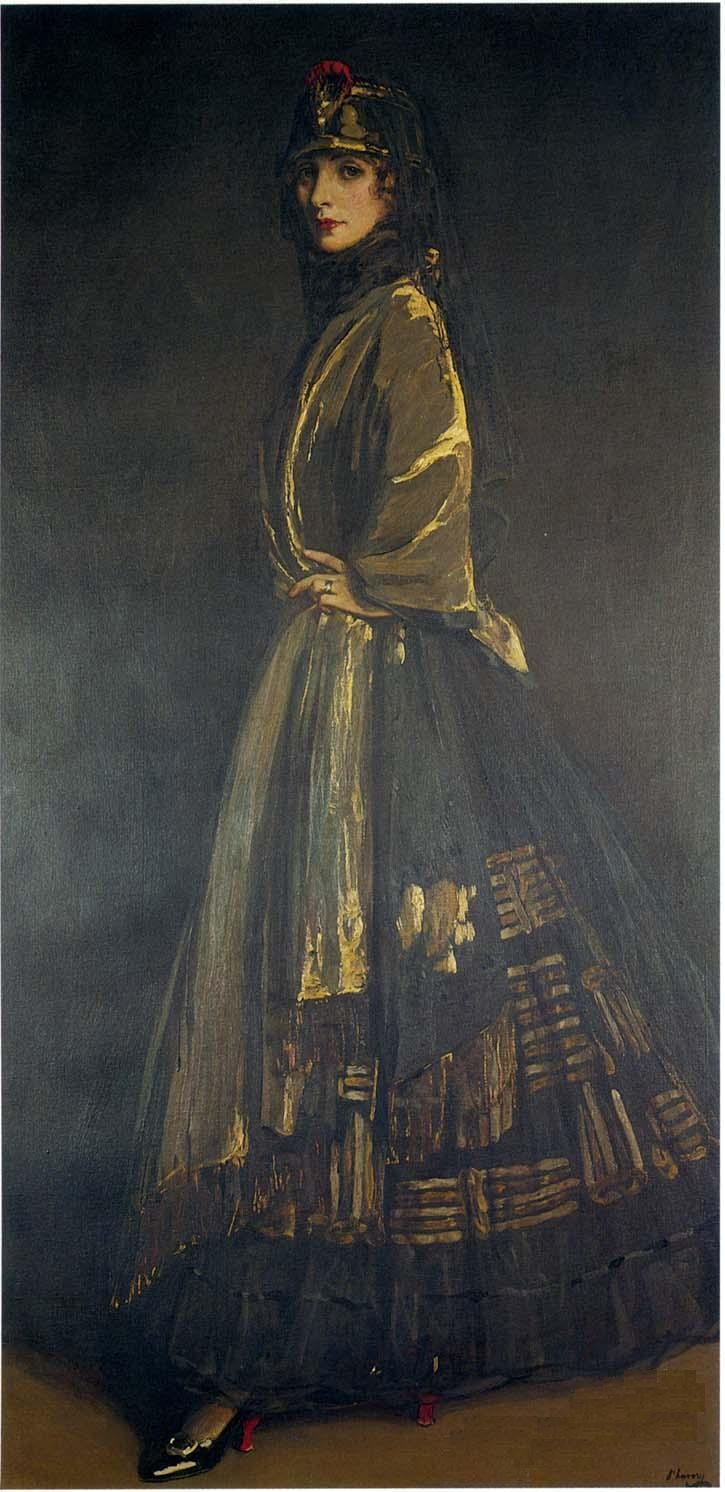
John Lavery

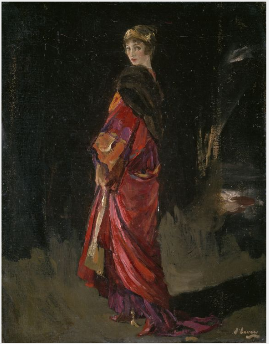
John Lavery

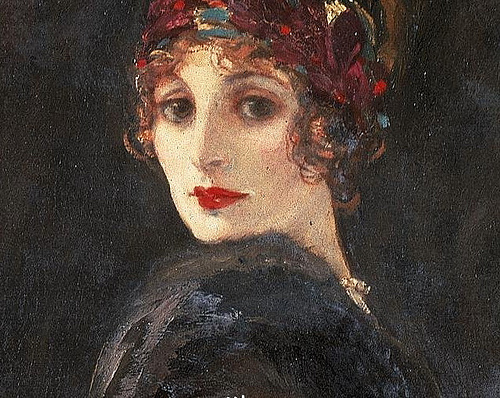
John Lavery

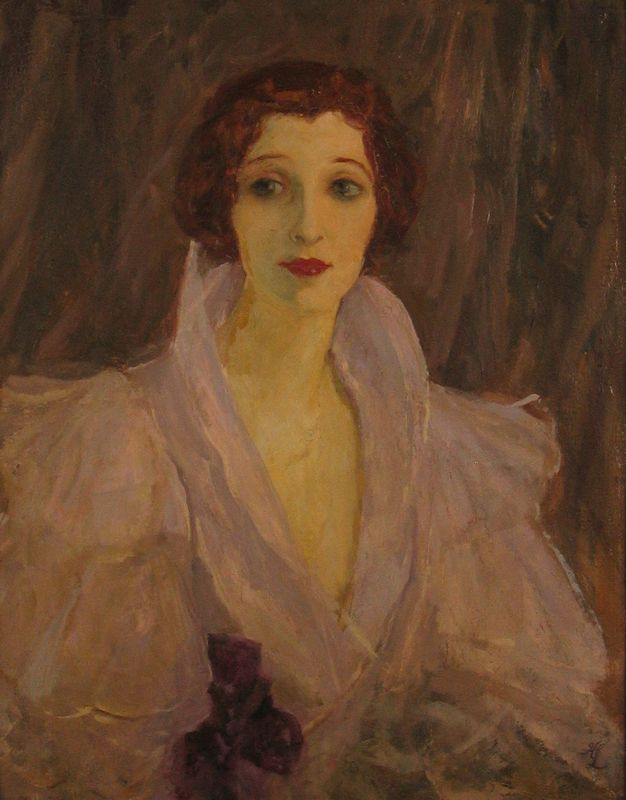
Hazel Lavery

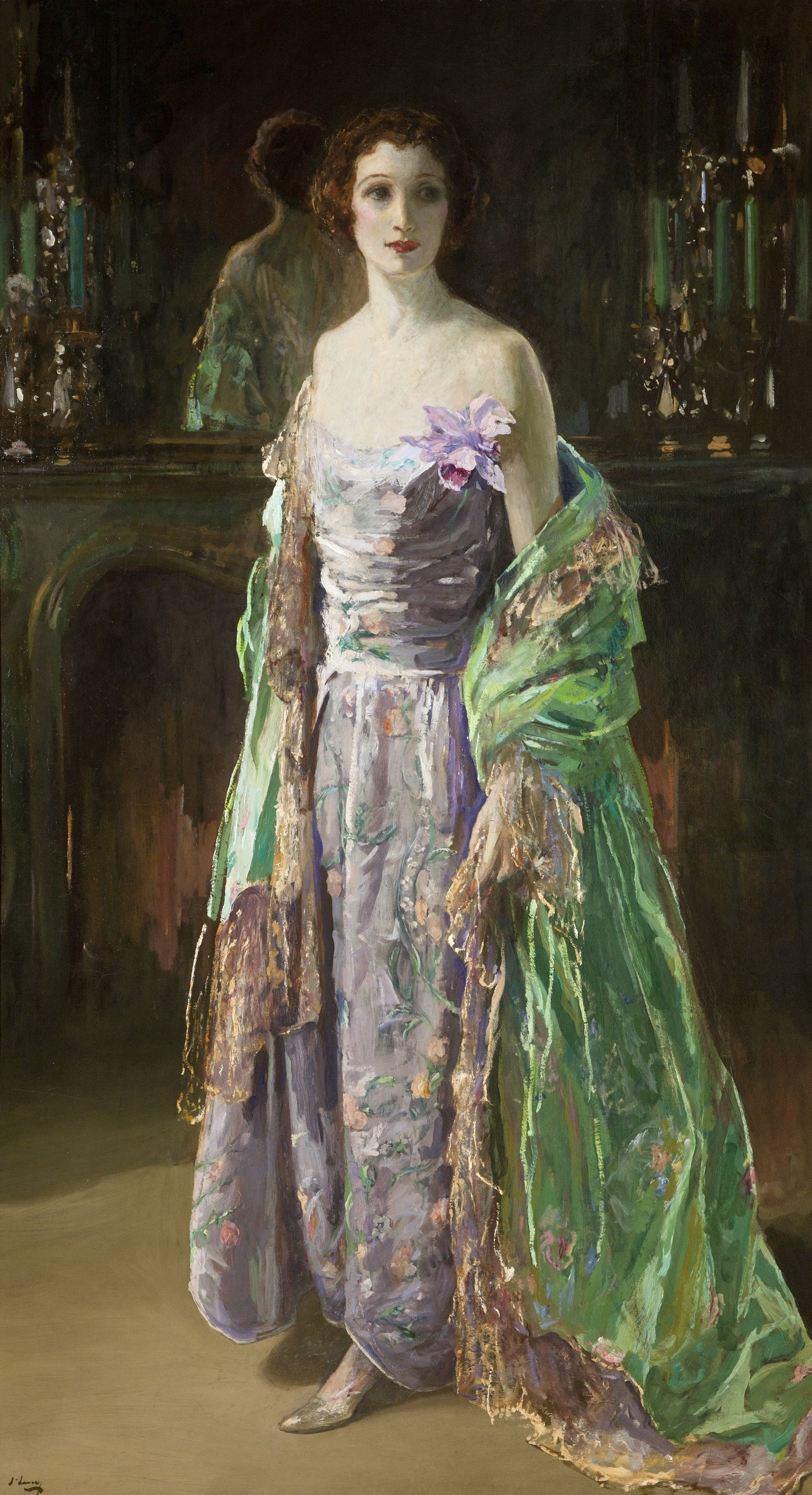
John Lavery

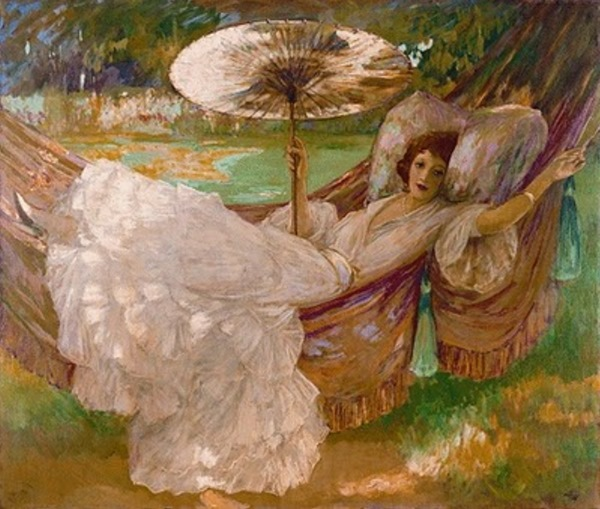
John Lavery

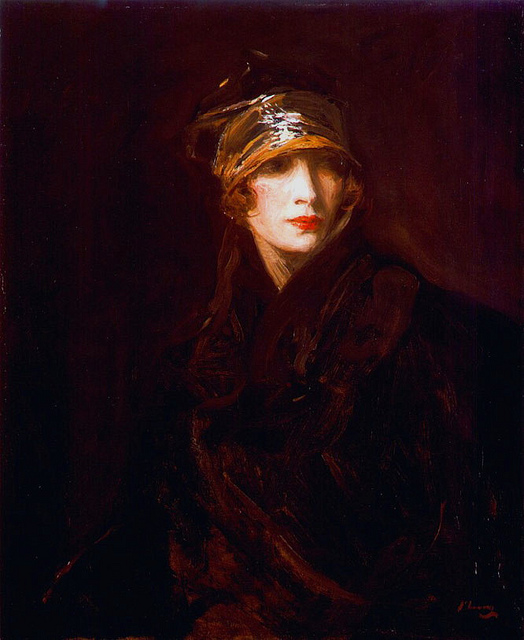
John Lavery

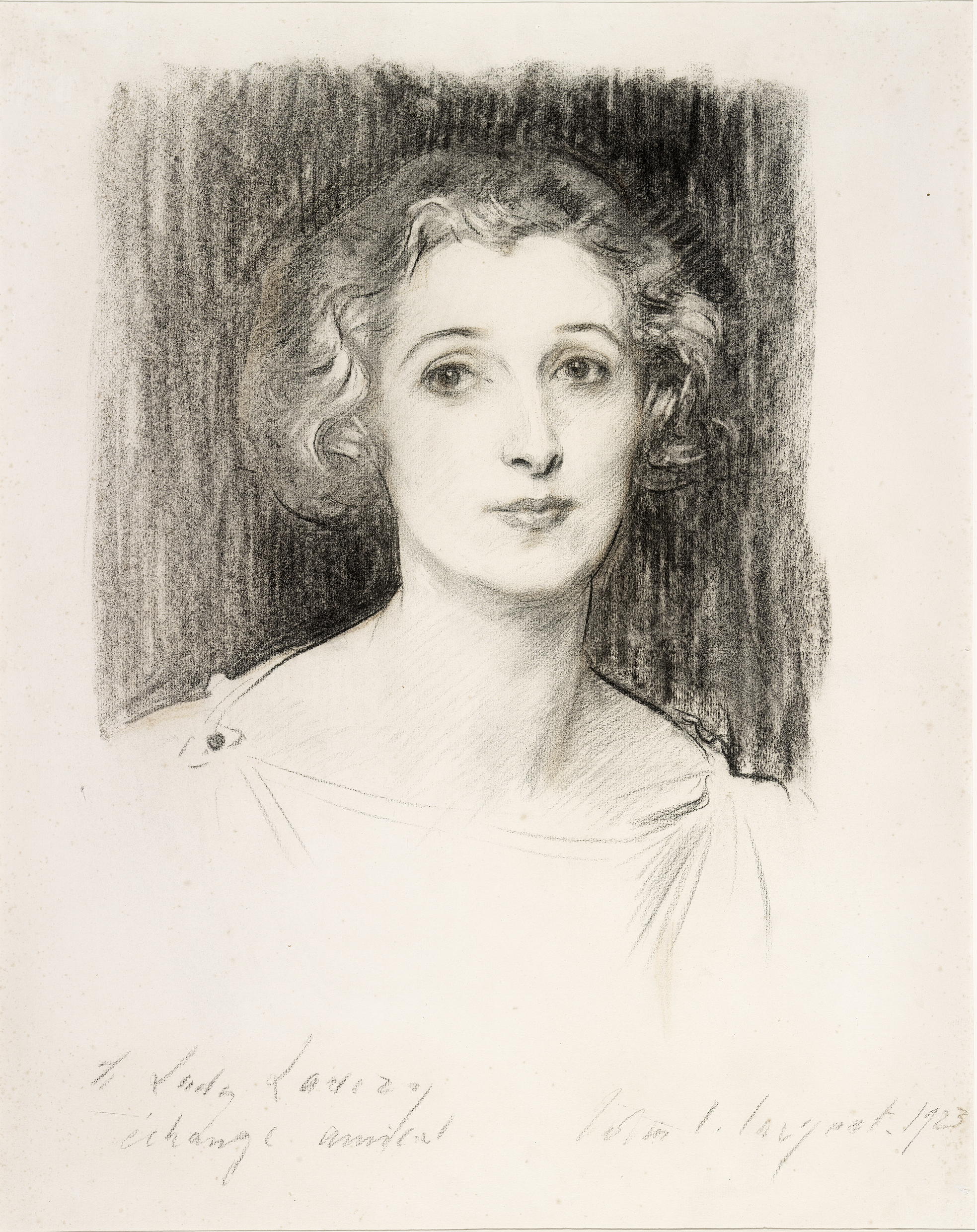
John Singer Sargent
