= The Golden Age of Murder =

2015 book by Martin Edwards

- Author: Martin Edwards
- Published: 2015
- Publisher: HarperCollins
- Media type: Print
- Pages: 528
- Awards: Edgar Award for Best Critical/Biographical Works (2016)
- ISBN: 978-0-008-10596-9
- Website: The Golden Age of Murder

The Golden Age of Murder is a book written by Martin Edwards and published by HarperCollins on 7 May 2015 which later went on to win the Edgar Award for Best Critical / Biographical Work in 2016.

== A history of mystery ==
As he explains in the Introduction, when Edwards himself became a published author of mystery fiction he was thrilled to be invited to join The Detection Club, about which he had first learned from the pages of Julian Symons' history of mystery writing Bloody Murder.

Subsequently he was made the club's archivist - only to discover that there were no archives; the club's only known minute-book had disappeared in the Blitz, and its priceless library had been sold off.

Inspired by his deep love of detective fiction, he set out to reconstruct some part of the club's history, of that "... elite but mysterious group of crime writers over which Sayers, Christie and Symons presided for nearly 40 years." In so doing, he discovered that the members themselves and events surrounding them were at least as fascinating as anything they had written about.
