= Lake District Mysteries =

Series of detective novels by Martin Edwards

The Lake District Mysteries are a series of detective novels by British crime writer Martin Edwards. The books feature Hannah Scarlett and the historian Daniel Kind, and are the first series of crime novels by a British detective novelist to be set in the Lake District, a region in North-West England.

The first book in the series, The Coffin Trail, was one of six books shortlisted for the Theakston’s Old Peculier Award for best crime novel of 2006, and each of the novels has received outstanding reviews. The books are published by Allison & Busby in the UK, by Poisoned Pen Press in the US, and by Luebbe in Germany.

== Novels ==
- The Coffin Trail (2004)
- The Cipher Garden (2006)
- The Arsenic Labyrinth (2007)
- The Serpent Pool (2010)
- The Hanging Wood (2011)
- The Frozen Shroud (2013)
- The Dungeon House (2015)
- The Crooked Shore (aka The Girl They All Forgot) (2021)

== Characters ==
=== Daniel Kind ===
Daniel is a historian with a personal and professional interest in the work of detectives who has abandoned a highly successful career following the suicide of his partner. During the course of the Lake District Mysteries, Daniel comes to know Detective Chief Inspector Hannah Scarlett and gradually a relationship develops between them.

Daniel first appeared in The Coffin Trail.

=== Hannah Scarlett ===
She is a Detective Chief Inspector in the Cumbria Constabulary and heads the Cold Case Review Team.

Hannah first appeared in The Coffin Trail. She lives with bookseller Marc Amos, but during the course of the Lake District Mysteries she becomes increasingly drawn to the historian, Daniel Kind, son of the veteran police officer who was her mentor in the early years of her career in the police.
