= Thorpe Hazell =

- Created by: Victor Whitechurch

In-universe information
- Gender: Male
- Nationality: English

Thorpe Hazell is a fictional detective created by the British author Victor Lorenzo Whitechurch. Hazell was a railway expert and a vegetarian, whom the author intended to be as far from Sherlock Holmes as possible. Short stories about Thorpe Hazell appeared in the Strand Magazine, the Royal Magazine, The Railway Magazine, Pearson's Magazine and The Harmsworth Magazine. They were collected in Thrilling Stories of the Railway (1912).

== List of stories ==
- "Peter Crane's Cigars"
- "The Tragedy on the London and Mid-Northern"
- "The Affair of the Corridor Express"
- "Sir Gilbert Murrell's Picture"
- "How the Bank Was Saved"
- "The Affair of the German Dispatch-Box"
- "How the Bishop Kept His Appointment"
- "The Adventure of the Pilot Engine"
- "The Stolen Necklace"

== Radio ==
Five stories were adapted for radio and read by Benedict Cumberbatch on BBC Radio 7.

No.	Original airdate	Title
1	8 December 2008	"The Affair of the German Dispatch-Box"
2	9 December 2008	"Sir Gilbert Murrell's Picture"
3	10 December 2008	"The Affair of the Corridor Express"
4	11 December 2008	"The Stolen Necklace"
5	12 December 2008	"The Affair of the Birmingham Bank" (i.e., "How the Bank Was Saved")
