= Milward Kennedy =

UK public servant and writer (1894–1968)

Milward Kennedy in 1939

Milward Rodon Kennedy Burge (21 June 1894 – 20 January 1968) was an English civil servant, journalist, crime writer and literary critic. He was educated at Winchester College and New College, Oxford. He served with British Military Intelligence in World War I and then worked for the International Labour Organization and the Egyptian government. He was London editor of the Empire Digest and reviewed mystery fiction for The Sunday Times and The Guardian. He retired in the 1960s to West Sussex. Burge married Georgina Lee in 1921 and after her death married Eveline Schrieber Billiat in 1926. He also wrote under the pseudonym Evelyn Elder.

Kennedy specialised in police mysteries, but also wrote about the adventures of Sir George Bull, a professional private investigator. He also collaborated with other members of The Detection Club on The Floating Admiral and Ask a Policeman. His series characters are Sir George Bull and Inspector Cornford.

== Bibliography ==
- The Bleston Mystery (1928) with A. G. Macdonell. As Robert Milward Kennedy
- The Corpse on the Mat (1929). Serialised in the US in 1930 as The Man Who Rang the Bell
- Corpse Guards Parade (1929)
- Half Mast Murder (1930)
- Death in a Deck-Chair (1930)
- Death to the Rescue (1931)
- The Floating Admiral (1931) with others
- The Murderer of Sleep (1932)
- Bull's Eye (1933)
- Ask a Policeman (1933) with others
- Corpse in Cold Storage (1934)
- Poison in the Parish (1935)
- Sic Transit Gloria (1936). Serialised in the US in 1936 as Scornful Corpse
- I'll be Judge, I'll be Jury (1937)
- It Began in New York (1943)
- Escape to Quebec (1946)
- The Top Boot (1950)

=== Short stories ===
- Death in the Kitchen. Evening Standard, 11 August 1932
- The Illusionist. The Bystander, 4 September 1935
- Through Glass, Darkly. The Bystander, Christmas Number 1935
- One Performance Only. The Bystander, 8 April 1936
- Mightier Than the Sword. The Bystander, 29 April 1936
- Modern Antique. The Bystander, 11 November 1936
- The Fur Coat. The Bystander, 18 August 1937
- Fables of Forgetfulness No. 1: It Pays to Forget. The Bystander, 20 July 1938
- Fables of Forgetfulness No. 2: A Regretful Lapse. The Bystander, 27 July 1938
- Fables of Forgetfulness No. 3: Superstition. The Bystander, 3 August 1938
- Why the Button?. The Bystander, 21 December 1938
- The Case of the Index Finger. Evening Standard, 7 March 1950
- The Fool. Evening Standard, 13 April 1950
- Q's Camp. Evening Standard, 21 April 1950
- The Conjuror's Art. Evening Standard, 14 August 1950
- The Accident. Evening Standard, 22 September 1950
- The Horse's Mouth. Evening Standard, 24 November 1950
- The Fake. Evening Standard, 28 December 1950
- Accent on Pearls. Evening Standard, 30 January 1951
- Knave of Clubs. Evening Standard, 6 April 1951
- X Takes Bishop. Evening Standard, 16 April 1951
- Miss Amelia. Evening Standard, 10 May 1951
- Poste Restante. Evening Standard, 25 June 1951
- Hearing Is Believing. Evening Standard, 13 July 1951
- Private Room. Evening Standard, 14 August 1951
- The Deadly Circle. Evening Standard, 20 September 1951
- Tea Party. Evening Standard, 10 October 1951
- You Have Been Warned. Evening Standard, 16 November 1951
- The Murderee. Evening Standard, 18 December 1951
- The Man Outside. Evening Standard, 23 January 1952
- Cupboard Hate. Evening Standard, 9 April 1952
- Brief Candle. Evening Standard, 1 March 1954
- China Clay. Evening Standard, 29 March 1954
- Alibi by Post. Evening Standard, 27 April 1954
- Up Jenkins. Evening Standard, 16 July 1954
- The Operative Word. Evening Standard, 26 July 1954

=== Short non-fiction ===
- The Rendezvous at the Rising Sun. Sunday Sun & Guardian, 14 July 1935

=== As Evelyn Elder ===
- Murder in Black and White (1931)
- Angel in the Case (1932)
- Two's Company (1952)
