= Jessie Louisa Rickard =

Irish literary and crime fiction writer

Jessie Louisa Rickard, also known as Mrs Victor Rickard (1876–1963), was an Irish literary novelist. During her lifetime she became a versatile writer who produced over forty novels, some of which found a large reading public. She preferred to be known as Mrs Victor Rickard to avoid association with a young woman called Jessie Rickard, who was brutally murdered in an incident reported in the media as 'The Cornish Tragedy'.

== Early life ==
She was born in Dublin as Jessica Louisa Moore, younger daughter of Canon Courtenay Moore M.A., V.P.R.S.A.I. (1842–1922), then rector of Castletownroch and later of Brigown, Mitchelstown, co. Cork, a noted antiquarian, founder of the Cork Historical and Archaeological Society and a Protestant Home Ruler, editor of The Church of Ireland Gazette and author of two novels. She spent her youth in Mitchelstown, and when only 18 (1894) wrote a series of hunting sketches which appeared in the Cork Examiner. They were so popular that she followed with a hunting story, The Price of a Friend, which was accepted as a series by the Irish Times. She married Robert Dudley Innes Ackland, by whom she had a daughter, and later divorced him, which caused a rift with her father.

== Literary career ==
The Last General Absolution of the Munsters at Rue du Bois by Matania. It depicts Victor Rickard mounted on the left

Not until 1912 however, when already aged 36, did she publish her first novel, Young Mr. Gibbs, a light and humorous work. Her next book, Dregs, which appeared in 1914, was a psychological study and was the forerunner of many romantic and sometimes sensational tales marked by great vitality. The word powerful can justly be applied to them and all had evocative titles: The Dark Stranger, Blindfold, Yesterdays Love, Old Sins Have Long Shadows, and A Reckless Puritan. She had married Lieut. Colonel Victor Rickard, a professional officer of the 2nd Battalion Royal Munster Fusiliers who featured prominently in the painting The Last Absolution of the Munsters by the war artist Matania, which depicts the second battalion of the Munsters halting at a wayside shrine at "Rue du Bois" on the eve of the Battle of Aubers Ridge in May 1915, in which Rickard, who led the regiment, was to die with many of his comrades.

Now widowed and with a son to support, she reverted to writing as a source of income. She first published The Story of the Munsters (1915) which provided the subject for this well-known Matania picture commissioned by her, depicting the Chaplain of the Munsters, Father Francis Gleeson, giving the Munsters their last absolution. She also published a series of articles in New Ireland during 1915 entitled The Irish at the Front, in which New Ireland claimed several soldiers received medals as a result.

== Prolific writer ==
Beginning with Young Mr Gibbs (1911) to Shandon Hall (1950) she wrote over forty novels ranging in genre from light comedy to detective novels which earned her a living as a popular novelist. With a widening reputation, and together with Dorothy Sayers, G. K. Chesterton, Fr. Ronald Knox and others she was a founder member of the Detective Writers' Club. Having moved to England for some years, she was received into the Catholic Church in 1925 by Rev. Joseph Leonard C.M. who at that time was stationed with the Vincentians at Strawberry Hill, London. Most of her novels were published under the name "Mrs Victor Rickard", but she also achieved a reputation with others, as the author of The Pointing Man.

== Later life ==
Illness and publishing difficulties due to the war brought an end to her high productivity. She moved to Lower Montenotte in Cork city in 1948 where she wrote her last novel. Her home became a frequent gathering place for a wide range of visitors. Mrs. Rickard was a close friend of Lady Hazel Lavery (1880–1935) who was the subject of her novel A Bird of Strange Plumage (1927). A debilitating stroke in the nineteen-fifties left her paralyzed on one side and she taught herself to write with her left hand. In her later years, she lived in the Montenotte home of Alice and Denis Gwynn. Alice (née Trudeau) was Lady Lavery's daughter by her first marriage, and granddaughter of tuberculosis pioneer Edward Livingston Trudeau.

She died on 28 January 1963 at the age of 86 and is buried in Rathcooney Cemetery, Greater Cork.

== Bibliography ==
=== Novels ===
- Young Mr Gibbs (Eveleigh Nash, 1911)
- Dregs (Rivers, 1914)
- The Light Above the Cross Roads (1916)
- The Frantic Boast (Duckworth, 1917)
- The Fire of Green Boughs (Duckworth, 1918)
- The House of Courage (Duckworth, 1919)
- Cathy Rossiter (Hodder & Stoughton, 1919)
- A Reckless Puritan (Hodder & Stoughton, 1920)
- A Fool's Errand (Hodder & Stoughton, 1921)
- Blindfold (Jonathan Cape, 1922)
- Without Justification (Jonathan Cape, 1923)
- Old Sins have Long Shadows (Constable, 1924)
- The Young Man in Question (1924)
- A Rebel House. Serialised, Freeman's Journal, 17 September 1924 to [DATE UNKNOWN]
- Upstairs? (Constable, 1925)
- His Wife. Serialised, St Andrew's Citizen from 30 January 1926 to [DATE UNKNOWN]
- Not Sufficient Evidence (Hodder & Stoughton, 1926). Serialised, May 1925 to February 1926
- The Light that Lies (Hodder & Stoughton, 1927)
- A Bird of Strange Plumage (Hodder & Stoughton, 1927)
- The Passionate City (1928)
- The Perilous Elopement (Hodder & Stoughton, 1928). Serialised, Dundee Evening Telegraph & Post, 1929
- The Guests of Chance (Hodder & Stoughton, 1928). Serialised, Dundee Courier & Advertiser, 1928
- The Scarlet Sin Serialised, Dundee Evening Telegraph, 1 May to 11 June 1929
- The Empty Villa (Hodder & Stoughton, 1929)
- The House on the Sands (1930). Serialised, Bucks Examiner (1930)
- The Dark Stranger (Hodder & Stoughton, 1930). Serialised, Dundee Evening Telegraph & Post, 1928
- The Mystery of Vincent Dane (Hodder & Stoughton, 1930). Serialised, Dundee Courier & Advertiser, 1930
- Yesterday's Love (Hodder & Stoughton, 1931). Serialised, Daily Mail, 1930
- Young Mrs Henniker (Jarrolds, 1931)
- Spring Hill (Jarrolds, 1932)
- Sorel's Second Husband (Jarrolds, 1932)
- The Young Man in Question (Jarrolds, 1933). Serialised, St Andrew's Citizen from 2 August to 1 November 1924
- Sensation at Blue Harbour (Skeffington, 1934)
- House Party (Jarrolds, 1935)
- Murder by Night (Jarrolds, 1936)
- ‘’The Secret Watcher’’. Serialised, Dundee Evening Telegraph & Post, 1936
- The Mystery of Tara Heston (Jarrolds, 1938)
- The Guilty Party (Jarrolds, 1940)
- Ascendancy House (Jarrolds, 1944)
- White Satin (Jarrolds, 1945)
- Shandon Hall (Jarrolds, 1950)
- ‘’The Pointing Man’’(undated)

=== Short fiction ===
- The Night Attendant. Western Times, 2 April 1918
- The Cardinal's Blessing. The Sphere, 30 November 1918
- The Tea Party. BIrmingham Weekly Post, DATE UNKNOWN 1937

=== Non-fiction books ===
- The Story of the Munsters at Etreux, Festubert and Rois du Bois (New Ireland Office, 1915)

=== Short non-fiction ===
- New Ireland series The Irish at the Front, June–November 1915
- W.A.N.D.: A Mascot. The Sphere, 20 May 1916
- The Sphere articles, The Munsters in the Retreat, March 1918
- Prisoners and Captives: I. The Woman's Leader and the Common Cause, 9 April 1920
- Prisoners and Captives: II. The Woman's Leader and the Common Cause, 16 April 1920
- Ireland Revisited. The Woman's Leader and the Common Cause, 1 October 1920
- The Forthcoming Municipal Elections. The Woman's Leader and the Common Cause, 15 October 1920
- Public taste and the Future of the Novel. Liverpool Echo, 7 November 1925
- The Road to Rome: Why I Am a Catholic. Freeman's Journal, 16 September 1926
