= Alice Campion =

Pseudonym of a group of Australian writers

Alice Campion is the pseudonym of a group of Australian writers who have published two collaborative novels, The Painted Sky (Random House, 2015; published in German as Der Bunte Himmel, Ullstein Verlag 2015), and The Shifting Light (Penguin Random House, 2017). The group promotes collaborative fiction writing through workshops, public lectures, and the internet.

== Members ==
Alice Campion consists of four core members: Denise Tart, a Sydney civil celebrant with a background in writing and performance; Jane Richards, a senior travel editor with Australian media group Fairfax; Jane St Vincent Welch (full name Mary Jane St Vincent Welch), an Australian film editor; and Jenny Crocker, a communications manager specialising in behaviour change campaigns. For its first novel, the Alice Campion group also included Madeline Oliver.

== Origins ==
The Alice Campion collaborators met as members of an inner-city book club in Sydney, Australia, The Book Sluts. In 2010, while discussing Crime and Punishment, five members of the group decided spontaneously to write a ‘bestseller’ in order to fund a trip to Russia. What began as a light-hearted attempt to write a run-of-the-mill romance soon developed into a more serious attempt to write a quality genre novel. The group was also motivated by the lack of collaborative writing in commercial fiction. While other forms of creative writing – notably screenwriting for television and movies – thrived on collaboration, multi-author novels were rare.

Other successful collaborative pairs writing commercial Australian literature include Thomas Keneally and his daughter Meg Kenneally as well as Florence James and Dymphna Cusack, who wrote the classic Australian novel Come In Spinner. Alice Campion remains the only multi-member commercial fiction group collaboration in the world.

== Writing process ==
The Alice Campion authors have outlined their writing process in detail, that they refer to as 'group fiction'. The document this process in their e-book How to Write Fiction as a Group. Generally, the group meets on a Sunday to develop the plot of the book. This involves breaking the existing story into short scenes of around two to four pages. The group collaboratively decides what will happen in each scene: the action, setting the point of view, impacts on the emotion and knowledge of the participating character and the tone. Each writer then takes a single scene away and writes it as a draft. Scenes must be written and circulated to the other writers ahead of the next meeting, which generally takes place on a Thursday. At this Revision Meeting, each writer reads her own scene out loud and other participants have an opportunity to suggest improvements, which are integrated or not by agreement. In subsequent drafts, scenes are re-written by someone other than the original author and edited collaboratively to ensure a smooth and seamless narrative. Disagreements are decided by a vote.

== Bibliography ==
- The Painted Sky (Random House Australia, 2015), published in German as Der Bunte Himmel (Ullstein Verlag, 2015). In this family mystery/romance hybrid, a young urban designer inherits an outback property and is drawn into layers of family secrets.
- How to Write Fiction as a Group (2015), an e-book by Alice Campion members Jenny Crocker, Jane Richards and Denise Tart.
- The Shifting Light (Penguin Random House, 2017), a sequel to The Painted Sky.

== Public reception ==
Following its publication in 2015, The Painted Sky drew attention from the Australian media. The Alice Campion authors have presented at numerous events, workshops and festivals including the Japan Writers’ Conference, the inaugural St Albans Writers’ Festival, the New South Wales Writers' Centre, the Society of Women Writers (NSW), the State Library NSW, the NSW Writers' Centre, and for Writers Victoria at the Wheeler Centre in Melbourne. Following the publication of The Shifting Light in 2017, the Alices appeared at the Sydney Writers' Festival and ran a workshop on how to write collaborative fiction.
