= Series A banknotes =

Banknotes of the Irish pound

A £1 Series A banknote

The Series A banknotes (Irish: Nótaí bainc sraith A) were the first banknotes created by and for the Irish Free State in 1928 and continued to be issued when the Free State became the Republic of Ireland. They are considered to "count amongst the most iconic and beautiful of all modern banknotes." The series is known as "The Lady Lavery Series", from the prominent portrait on the front of the notes. The notes were issued from 1928 to 1977 until they were gradually replaced by Series B banknotes beginning in 1976. However, as no £100 note was issued in Series B, the Series A £100 note remained in use until replaced by the Series C note in 1996.

== Banknotes ==
The Currency Commission of the Irish Free State prescribed the design of the notes and received advice from an advisory commission. Waterlow and Sons, Limited, London printed the notes on behalf of the commission. The series consists of notes in seven denominations: 10s, £1, £5, £10, £20, £50 and £100.

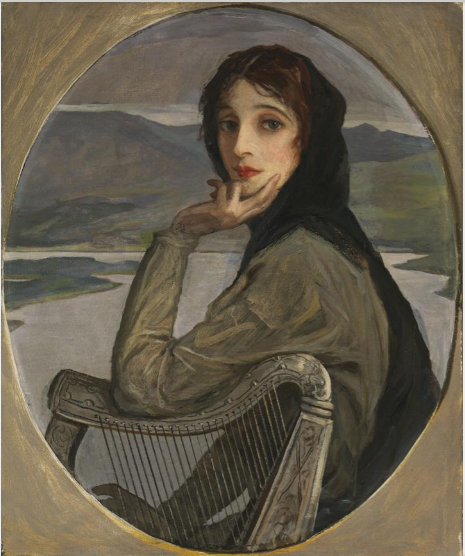
Portrait of Lady Lavery as Kathleen Ni Houlihan (1927) by John Lavery

Each note has a portrait of Lady Lavery – wife of the artist Sir John Lavery, who was commissioned to design this feature. The original oil on canvas painting of Lady Lavery, titled Portrait of Lady Lavery as Kathleen Ni Houlihan (1927), is displayed at the National Gallery of Ireland on loan from the Central Bank of Ireland. From the description of Lady Lavery's portrait at the National Gallery:

In 1927, [John] Lavery agreed to assist the Currency Commission in the design of the first Free State banknotes. Reworking a portrait of his wife Hazel of 1909, he cast her as Kathleen ni Houlihan, the mythical heroine of W.B. Yeats’s play of 1902, and placed her against a view of the lakes of Killarney. The artist later quoted W.T. Cosgrave, President of the Executive Council of the Irish Free State, as saying of the banknotes: ‘Every Irishman, not to mention the foreigner who visits Ireland, will carry one next to his heart’.

Portrait of Lady Lavery on a 10-pound Series A banknote

Reduced version of Lady Lavery's portrait on a 5-pound Series A banknote

The banknote design placed the portrait on the left of the banknotes, so the image from the painting was reversed to face right. The full portrait appears on the larger £10, £20, £50 and £100 notes but is reduced to a head and shoulders version on the smaller 10s, £1 and £5 notes. The head from the portrait was later used as a watermark on the Series B and Series C banknotes until 2002.

The watermark on all Series A banknotes is the "Head of Erin" taken from the statue, Hibernia with the Bust of Lord Cloncurry (1844), sculpted in Rome by John Hogan and brought to Ireland in 1846. The statue depicts Ireland, represented by the allegorical female figure of Hibernia, also known as “Erin”, with her arm around a bust of Lord Cloncurry. Hogan modeled the female figure after his Italian wife, Cornelia Bevignani. This statue is considered by some authorities to be Hogan's masterpiece. and "one of the finest examples of Irish neoclassical sculpture". The statue is in the collection of University College Dublin and is located at Belfield House.

The reverse of each denomination features the head of a "River God" representing one of the rivers of Ireland taken from a keystone on the Custom House, Dublin sculpted by Edward Smyth. Rivers in both the Irish Free State and Northern Ireland were chosen.

The Currency Commission notes were printed with Currency Commission/Coimisiún Airgid Reatha and Irish Free State/Saorstát Éireann with facsimiles of the signatures of the Chairman of the Currency Commission/Cathaoirleach Choimisiúin an Airgid Reatha and of the Secretary of the Department of Finance/Rúnaí na Roinne Airgid. When the Constitution of Ireland had legal effect Ireland was substituted for Irish Free State, Éire for Saorstát Éireann.

In 1943 additional changes were made when the Central Bank Act of 1942 gave legal effect. The Currency Commission was replaced with Central Bank of Ireland/Banc Ceannais na hÉireann on the notes and the signature of the chairman was replaced with that of Governor/An Ghobharnóir.

Banknotes produced during the Second World War were overprinted with different letters so that particular batches could be identified and removed from circulation if they were lost in transit between the printers in Britain and Dublin. The promise of exchange in London was removed from the notes in 1961. A metal security thread was added to the £1, £5 and £10 notes in 1971.

Series A (1928–1977)
Value	Dimensions (millimetres)	Main colour	Reverse design	First issued	Last issued
10s	138 × 78	Orange	River Blackwater	10 September 1928	6 June 1968
£1	151 × 84	Green	River Lee	10 September 1928	30 September 1976
£5	165 × 92	Brown	River Lagan	10 September 1928	5 September 1975
£10	191 × 108	Blue	River Bann	10 September 1928	2 December 1976
£20	203 × 114	Red	River Boyne	10 September 1928	24 March 1976
£50	203 × 114	Mauve	River Shannon	10 September 1928	4 April 1977
£100	203 × 114	Olive	River Erne	10 September 1928	4 April 1977†

† No £100 note was issued in Series B. The Series A £100 note remained in use until the Series C £100 note was issued in 1996.

Heads of river gods on the reverse of Series A banknote denominations
River Blackwater on 10s

River Lee on £1

River Lagan on £5

River Bann on £10

River Boyne on £20

River Shannon on £50

River Erne on £100

== See also ==
- Banknotes of the Republic of Ireland
