= Addventure =

Type of online interactive fiction

An addventure, also known as a collaborative gamebook, is a type of online interactive fiction that combines aspects of round-robin stories and Choose Your Own Adventure-style tales. Like a round-robin story, an addventure is a form of collaborative fiction in which many authors contribute to a story, each writing discrete segments. However, like a gamebook, the resulting narrative is non-linear, allowing authors to branch out in different directions after each segment of the story. The result is a continually growing work of hypertext fiction.

== History ==
The emergence of computer networks and electronic communication made the writing of collaborative fiction faster and more convenient than previous forms of correspondence. Round-robin stories were being written on bulletin board systems, mailing lists and USENET news groups, and many variations of the format were tried. One early form of branching story that emerged, where participants of such a round-robin group would start telling side-stories in parallel with the main story as it was still being created, led to very confusing and hard-to-follow stories if multiple branches were concurrently being extended on the same board or mailing list. Soon, systems emerged in which such branches were formalized and easily separated from the main story.

The portmanteau word "addventure" was coined by Allen "Prisoner" Firstenberg when he created an add-on story for the Nyack High School BBS in 1987–88 and called it "Add-venture". In 1994, the story was transplanted to the World Wide Web in HTML format, where it garnered some attention—and soon many imitators.

The magazines Internet World and Wired both wrote about Firstenberg's addventure. Firstenberg's addventure site is still accessible as of 2016, but all three stories that he ran have been closed for new additions since 1999.

Since then, a number of other addventures have been launched on the Web, some using Firstenberg's software and others using their own code. At least two of these stories have been running continuously for over twenty years:

- The BE Addventure This began on June 20, 1998. As of 3 June 2019, 300,549 episodes had been written. The addventure's subject matter is pornographic.
- Extend-A-Story: The Never Ending Quest This began on February 9, 1999. As of 3 June 2019, 33,167 episodes had been written. This game starts as a sword and sorcery epic, but it often transforms into other genres.

The uses of hypertext fiction whose content is goal-driven include exploration of the concepts of alternate history, so-called Many-Worlds interpretation, collaborative fiction and the older idea of the mosaic novel.

== Structure ==
Addventures, by their nature of discrete segments of writing connected to each other by paths, generally follow a conceptual tree structure. Each individual written section is a node, usually with one parent node and zero or more child nodes. Extending the addventure with new writing then becomes a task of choosing the node that one wants and adding a new child to it, with the new material comprising the content of the child. An addventure generally begins with a single room or chapter (the root node of the tree), and is extended by writers from that point.

The contents of nodes of the addventure are typically stored in a database, and each new node is assigned a unique identification number. In addition to identifying the node and serving as a primary key field for searching and indexing, the number is used to specify URLs that lead directly to that node and manipulate the tree, usually to allow a node to be moved from one parent to another or to give it new children.

Apart from the obvious variations of story genre, addventures can vary in their access restrictions for writers and in the restrictions they place on branching. Some addventures leave the continuation of a finished segment completely open, allowing any number of continuations in any direction imaginable, while others allow the author of the segment to influence the continuation by explicitly listing a set of possible directions.

== See also ==
- Choose Your Own Adventure
- Hypertext fiction
- Interactive fiction
