= Constance Lindsay Taylor =

British screenwriter and author (1907–2000)

Constance Lindsay Taylor (10 January 1907 – 15 January 2000) was a British writer, playwright and screenwriter who wrote under the pseudonym Guy Cullingford. Her novels and short stories were written in the style of Golden Age detective fiction.

== Early life and marriage ==
Born Alice Constance Dowdy on 10 January 1907 in Dovercourt, Essex, she was the only child of Sidney Ernest Dowdy and Anna May Flowers. Her father was a chemist and a keen photographer.

She worked as a children’s librarian at Ipswich Library before marrying solicitor, Morris Lindsay Taylor, in July 1930. The couple moved to Chester, where Morris Lindsay Taylor held the role of Deputy Town Clerk. Over the next ten years, the couple had three children and relocated as Morris Lindsay Taylor took up the position of Town Clerk in Bognor Regis, followed by further town clerk roles in London.

== Career ==
Lindsay Taylor's first novel, Murder with Relish, was published in 1948, when she was 41 years old. The book was published under her actual name, but her publisher advised that she use a male pseudonym for subsequent novels. All of Lindsay Taylor's further work was published under the name Guy Cullingford; the surname was the maiden name of her maternal grandmother.

Lindsay Taylor went on to publish a further eleven novels, all of which were murder mysteries. Her most celebrated book, Post Mortem, was published in 1953, and received critical acclaim in both the UK and US. Her stories were noted for their in-depth characters, everyday settings, humour and wry observations on the British class system.

During the 1950s and 1960s, a number of Lindsay Taylor's short stories were published in fiction magazines including Alfred Hitchcock's Mystery Magazine and Ellery Queen's Mystery Magazine. The short story My Unfair Lady was published in three Alfred Hitchcock anthologies between 1959 and 1986.

In 1958, an adaptation of Post Mortem, entitled A Ghost of a Chance was broadcast on the BBC Home Service's Saturday Night Theatre. Lindsay Taylor wrote the script and the cast included Ronald Ward, Joan Matheson, Lionel Gamlin, and Jeffrey Segal.

During the 1970s, Lindsay Taylor wrote three screenplays for television: Sarah, The Boy Dave and The Winter Ladies. These were a departure from her usual mystery genre, and were centred around coming-of-age themes (Sarah and The Boy Dave) and domestic drama. All were produced by Yorkshire Television and broadcast on ITV. In 1973, Sarah was nominated for an International Emmy Award in the fiction category.

Lindsay Taylor's novels, and the short story, My Unfair Lady, were republished by Orion's digital imprint, The Murder Room, in 2015.

Lindsay Taylor was a member of the Detection Club, which was formed in 1930 by a group of British mystery authors including Agatha Christie, G. K. Chesterton and Dorothy L. Sayers. She died, aged 93, on 15 January 2000, at Marine House Nursing Home, Rosemarkie, Scotland.

== Publications ==
All published under the pseudonym Guy Cullingford, with the exception of Murder with Relish.

Novels

- Murder with Relish (1948) (published under the name Constance Lindsay Taylor)
- If Wishes Were Hearses (1952)
- Post Mortem (1953)
- Conjuror's Coffin (1954)
- Framed for Hanging (1956)
- The Whipping Boys (1958)
- A Touch of Drama (1960)
- Third Party Risk (1962)
- Brink of Disaster (1964)
- The Stylist (1968)
- Bread and Butter Miss (1979)
- Bother at the Barbican (1991)

Short stories

- Change Partners (1958)
- My Unfair Lady (1958)
- Kill and Cure (1958)
- Mr Mowbray's Predecessor (1961)
- The Birthday (1964)
- Something to Get at Quick (1967)
- Locals Should Know Best (1968)
- The Incurable Complaint (1969)

Plays and screenplays

- A Ghost of a Chance, broadcast on BBC Home Service, 14 June 1958
- Sarah, broadcast on ITV, 21 January 1973
- The Boy Dave, broadcast on ITV, 30 December 1975
- The Winter Ladies, broadcast on ITV, 15 May 1979
