= Bill Knox =

Scottish author (1928–1999)

William Knox (1928 – March 1999) was a Scottish author, journalist and broadcaster, best known for his crime novels and for presenting the long-running STV series Crimedesk.

== Life and career ==
Born in Glasgow, Knox became the youngest journalist for a Glasgow newspaper at age 16. He went on to report on crime, on motoring, and to become a news editor.

He began writing crime novels in the 1950s. Knox often wrote under pseudonyms, frequently for the American market. These included Michael Kirk, Robert MacLeod and Noah Webster. He published over 50 crime novels, including several series, notably the "Thane and Moss" books.

In the 1970s, he was approached by Scottish Television to present a series asking for public assistance in solving crimes in the central Scotland area. Knox presented the fifteen-minute slot for over ten years, always signing off with the promise that any calls to the police "can be in confidence". At this time he also made a series of short programmes called Tales of Crime, also for STV, in which he recounted famous Scottish criminal cases.

His crime novels from the 1960s onwards, and in the 1970s his Crimedesk television series, publicised the Glasgow slang term "neds", referring to petty criminals or small-time hoodlums. A 1982 analysis of crime fiction discussing Knox's 1977 novel Pilot Error noted his description of Strathclyde Police as being unconcerned about "neds" getting hurt in a fight as long as no one else was affected.

Knox's book The Crossfire Killings won the Police Review award for Best Police Procedural of 1986.

His final novel, The Lazarus Widow, was unfinished at the time of his death, and was completed by Martin Edwards.

The novels went out of publication following Knox's death in 1999. In 2024, Zertex Media, a publishing company owned by crime writer Barry Hutchison (who uses the pen name JD Kirk), began republishing the books, starting with Deadline for a Dream in January 2024.

== "Sunday Mail" interview ==
In 1965, Know was interviewed for the Sunday Mail by David Sinclair. The article's headline was "I want to kill the kilts and haggis image I confess" . He stated that research and detail were the keys to his books. When the interviewer visited Knox's house in Clarkston (according to the article) Knox's wife Myra was hanging from coat pegs so that Knox could discover how many pegs would be needed in real life. He admitted that he found it difficult to write women characters the way he wanted to, due to a puritanical, Calvanistic streak.

== Bibliography ==
- Deadline For A Dream (US: In At The Kill) (1957)
- The Cockatoo Crime (1958)
- Death Department (1959)
- Leave It To The Hangman (1960)
- Death Calls The Shots (1961)
- Die For Big Betsy (1961)
- Little Drops Of Blood (1962)
- Sanctuary Isle (US: The Grey Sentinels) (1962)
- The Man In The Bottle (US: The Killing Game) (1963)
- The Scavengers (1964)
- The Taste of Proof (1965)
- The Deep Fall (US: The Ghost Car) (1966)
- Devilweed (1966)
- Justice On the Rocks (1967)
- Blacklight (1967)
- The Klondyker (US: The Figurehead) (1968)
- Court of murder: Famous trials at Glasgow High Court (1968)
- Blueback (1969)
- Children of the Mist (US: Who Shot the Bull?) (1970)
- Seafire (1970)
- To Kill a Witch (1971)
- Stormtide (1972)
- Draw Batons (1973)
- Whitewater (1974)
- View from Daniel Pike (1974)
- Children of the Water (1974)
- Rally to Kill (1975)
- Hellspout (1976)
- A Witchdance in Bavaria (1976)
- A Pay-off in Switzerland (1977)
- Witchrock (1977)
- Pilot Error (1977)
- Live Bait (1978)
- Bombship (1980)
- Killing in Antiques (1981)
- Storyland Wall Frieze (1981)
- Tales of Crime (1982)
- Bloodtide (1982)
- The Hanging Tree (1983)
- Wavecrest (1985)
- The Crossfire Killings (1986)
- Dead Man's Mooring (1987)
- The Interface Man (1989)
- The Drowning Nets (1991)
- The Counterfeit Killers (1996)
- Lake of Fury (1996)
- An Incident in Iceland (1996)
- Place of Mists (1996)
- Salvage Job (1997)
- Blood Proof (1997)
- A Burial in Portugal (1997)
- Cargo Risk (1997)
- Isle of Dragons (1997)
- Nest of Vultures (1997)
- Country Club Wives (1997)
- A Cut in Diamonds (1997)
- Drum of Power (1998)
- Mayday from Malaga (1998)
- Death Bytes (1998)
- A Problem in Prague (1998)
- Cave of Bats (1998)
- Witchline (1999)
- The Lazarus Widow (with Martin Edwards) (1999)
