= Series B banknotes =

Banknotes of the Irish pound

A £1 Series B banknote

The Series B banknotes (Irish: Nótaí bainc sraith B) of Ireland replaced the Series A banknotes. The banknotes were issued between 1976 and 1992 by the Central Bank of Ireland, before being replaced in 1993 by Series C banknotes.

== Banknotes ==
The Central Bank announced its intention for the new banknotes in December 1971 and Servicon, an Irish design company, was employed to design the notes of the denominations; £1, £5, £10, £20, £50 and £100. The £100 note was never issued or circulated; this remains somewhat of an idiosyncrasy in the issue of Irish banknotes as this is the only series without a note of this denomination. The series was Legal Tender from 1976–1995, although not printed after May 1993.

The theme chosen for these notes was history of Ireland, and each note featured the portrait of a person with this theme in mind from a particular era from historic to modern and complementing visual elements. The portrait of Lady Lavery painted by Sir John Lavery was retained from Series A; contained as a watermark in the unprinted space. Each banknote has the signature of the Governor of the Central Bank of Ireland and the Secretary of the Department of Finance.

During much of the period of circulation of this series, foreign exchange controls prohibited the export of any notes larger than £20 from the Republic.

=== One Pound ===
The one pound note has a portrait of Medb, the legendary Queen of Connacht in Irish mythology. Also a pre-Christian geometric design based on those found on bone slips is used in on the note, the background is an excerpt from the Táin.

The reverse is a decorated excerpt from Lebor na hUidre, the oldest surviving Irish manuscript.

The one pound note was removed from circulation from June 1990 as it was replaced by the Irish pound coin. It was the final one pound note to be circulated and the first note of Series B to be removed from circulation.

=== Five Pounds ===
The five pound note has a portrait of Johannes Scotus Eriugena, the philosopher and theologian, of the ninth century. The letter A from the start of Psalm 17 of the Psalter of Ricemarcus is used against the Book of Durrow.

The reverse features an adaptation of animal and script extracts from the Book of Kells, an eighth century copy of the gospels.

=== Ten Pounds ===
The ten pound has a portrait of Dean Jonathan Swift the poet and satirist. The background contains a reproduction of the coat of arms of Dublin from a city council resolution against a letter by Swift from April 1735.

The reverse has a portion of a map of Dublin which was published by John Rocque in 1756. Great Abbey Street and Astons Quay - now known as Middle Abbey Street and Aston Quay respectively are shown as well as the River Liffey.

=== Twenty Pounds ===
The twenty pound note has a portrait of William Butler Yeats, the poet, dramatist, and mystic together with a representation of the mythological hero Cú Chulainn, based on the motif used by the Abbey Theatre. The background is of a Deirdre, a Yeats manuscript.

The reverse is an image of the Blasket Islands, off County Kerry with the background of An tOileánach by Tomás Ó Criomhthain.

=== Fifty Pounds ===
The fifty pound note has a portrait of Turlough O'Carolan, the blind Irish harper and composer, with the background from Timbrell.

The reverse has a design based on the wood carvings on the organ loft of St. Michan's Church, Dublin.

=== One Hundred Pounds ===
A Series B hundred pound note was never issued, the Series A £100 note remained in circulation.

A design mock up was submitted for the £100 denomination in August 1979. After some years of development, a decision was made to not proceed with production of the note, primarily because it was decided that the denomination was not required. The development of the note proceeded through several proof stages before being cancelled in early 1987.

During the late 1970s some newspapers reported that a planned £100 note would be mauve and would have Grace O'Malley on the front, and the Galtee Mountains, or a map of Ireland on the reverse, and the dimensions of the notes in size would be 188 x 98 mm. Detailed information about the design of the note became available with the opening of Central Bank of Ireland Archives to the public in 2017.

The face of the banknote design features a portrait of Grace O'Malley, the Pirate Queen, with one of her ships looming large in the centre and a second ship in the distance. The predominant colours are red for the portrait and mauve for the ship and background elements.

The reverse of the banknote design is predominantly beige. It features a genealogical map of Ireland, based on the 1567 map of "Hibernia: Insula non procul ab Anglia vulgare Hirlandia vocata" by John Goghe.

Series B (1976–1993)
Value	Dimensions (millimetres)	Main colours	Front	Reverse	First issued	Last issued
£1	148 × 78	Green & red	Queen Medb (Maeve)	Extract from Lebor na hUidre	10 June 1977	13 September 1989
£5	156 × 82	Brown	John Scotus Eriugena	Extract from the Book of Kells	26 February 1976	7 May 1993
£10	164 × 86	Purple	Jonathan Swift	Detail of John Rocque's 1756 Dublin street map	1 June 1978	15 April 1992
£20	172 × 90	Blue	W. B. Yeats	Map of the Blasket Islands	7 January 1980	14 February 1992
£50	180 × 94	Reds & browns	Turlough O'Carolan	Wood carvings in organ loft of St. Michan's Church, Dublin	1 November 1982	5 November 1991
£100	No £100 note was issued for Series B					
