= Harry Devlin (fictional detective) =

Harry Devlin is a fictional detective created by the British crime writer Martin Edwards. He has appeared in eight novels and eight short stories, and was described by Marcel Berlins in ‘The Guardian’ as ‘a charming but down-at-heel Liverpool solicitor with bruised emotions, a nice line in self-deprecation, and a penchant for Mersey low life.’ The series has received consistently good reviews.

In All the Lonely People, the book which introduced Harry Devlin, his estranged wife Liz is murdered, and he is the prime suspect. Harry needs to clear his name and find who killed the woman he loved. The book was nominated for the John Creasey Memorial Dagger for the best first crime novel of 1991 (the winner being Walter Mosley).

The first seven novels appeared between 1991 and 1999. Harry Devlin returned in 2008 in Waterloo Sunset, a novel which reflects the changes in his life and in his native Liverpool during the intervening years.

== Novels ==
- All the Lonely People (1991)
- Suspicious Minds (1992)
- I Remember You (1993)
- Yesterday’s Papers (1994)
- Eve of Destruction (1996)
- The Devil in Disguise (1998)
- First Cut is the Deepest (1999)
- Waterloo Sunset (2008)

== Short stories ==
- It's Impossible
- The Boxer
- When I'm Dead And Gone
- Never Walk Alone
- I Say A Little Prayer
- My Ship Is Coming In
- With A Little Help From my Friends
- A House Is Not A Home
