= Dorothy Bowers =

British writer

- Born: 11 June 1902; Leominster, Herefordshire, United Kingdom
- Died: 29 August 1948 (aged 46); England, United Kingdom
- Occupation: Novelist

Dorothy Bowers (1902–1948) was a British mystery novelist. After graduating from Oxford University she became a history teacher as well as compiling crossword puzzles. Her debut novel Postscript to Poison was well received by critics. Her five novels were all published during the Golden Age of Detective Fiction. She died from tuberculosis shortly after having been elected to the Detection Club in recognition of her novels. She had been considered a natural successor to Dorothy L. Sayers.

== Novels ==
- Postscript to Poison (1938) (featuring Inspector Pardoe)
- Shadows Before (1939) (featuring Inspector Pardoe)
- Deed without a Name (1940) (featuring Inspector Pardoe)
- Fear For Miss Betony (1941) (featuring Inspector Pardoe)
- The Bells at Old Bailey (1947) (featuring Inspector Raikes)

== Bibliography ==
- Edwards, Martin. The Golden Age of Murder. HarperCollins, 2015.
- Haycraft, Howard. Murder for Pleasure: The Life and Times of the Detective Story. Courier Dover Publications, 2019.
