= Chain writing =

Type of collaborative writing

Chain writing, also known as relay writing or estafet writing, is a type of collaborative writing in which a group of authors collectively write a piece of literature by each writing separate, subsequent sections of a larger story or critical work. The term was coined in 2015 by Madeira and Montanero in a thesis dissertation.

== Process ==
Chain writing typically starts with a prompt. This prompt can be an idea, an image, a piece of dialogue, or from a similar starting point. The process of chain writing is flexible and largely depends on the authors' ambitions when starting the project.

Authors must decide what the parameters for the chain writing are ahead of time. As writers write in fragments of text, they can choose to write in sentences, paragraphs, or, as in larger works of literature, chapters. Writers in the chain writing process may also choose to set their parameters as a time or page limit if they prefer to.

Then, once the parameters are set, the actual process of writing begins. The first designated author of the piece writes their segment of text, establishing a style and creating an introduction to the piece. Once they are done with their section of the piece, they pass the piece off to the next writer. The next writer will then read through the writing from the first writer and write their section based on what was previously set. Afterwards, they will pass it to the next person in the line of progression, who will then write a section based on both the previous segments. This process will continue to repeat itself, person after person, possibly going full circle back to the first author depending on the amount of writers participating and the length of the literature as a whole.

There are a few ways the chain writing can come to a close. Often, the process will end once the piece has gone through a full cycle of authors, though sometimes authors may decide to set a specific amount of passes that they want to go through before drawing the writing to a conclusion. Ultimately, it depends on the writers in the process and how they want to go about it.

In some forms of chain writing, such as the exquisite corpse, writers are only given a portion of what was last read rather than getting to read through all the prior writing. This allows for an even more sporadic style of writing.

== In education ==
Among students who are beginning writers or are writing in a new language, such as English Language Learners in the United States' education system, the chain writing process has been used in the teaching of language fluency and the writing process. Within the classroom, educators are typically the ones to provide the parameters of the chain writing activity.

Usually when a chain writing project is assigned in the classroom setting, educators place students in small groups to allow for a more peer-driven style of learning. Whereas writing is typically a task done independently, chain writing allows for collaboration to be introduced to the process. It has been shown that the group-oriented setting allows for students to think more critically about the narrative structure and pay more attention to the writing process. Students get more involved when they are working on the collaborative project in class than they do when working on individual writing. By getting the chance to work on a piece with other peers, students gain a better understanding of various writing aspects, whether it be in the writing style or the syntax of their sentences.

Because of this, chain writing works best when placing more advanced writers with writers who are still learning. This way, students are able to copy the mechanics from students who are more experienced with writing and apply it to their own ideas. It allows students to learn through example while also allowing the students to equally contribute to one project. Typically, this is taught using writing of description where students are given an object and asked to describe it. The chain method allows for students to look at what was already written about it by their peers and challenges students to build onto that description with something new but still relevant. Students are still asked to use their creativity in writing while working collaboratively in a group setting.

Usually, chain writing activities in the classroom settings are followed by a discussion afterwards where students can share their experience with the process.

One limitation that comes about from the chain writing process as a class activity is time constraint. Since students only get so much time inside the classroom in a day, students don't typically get a lot of time to think through their writing and properly polish it before having to pass it to the next person which may be demanding for slower writers.

== Chain novels ==
Also referred to as chain stories, chain novels are novels which follow the chain writing process. These novels are passed from author to author, each contributing some writing to the story based only on what had been written up until that point. Nobody knows what exactly will happen next except for the next writer in line. As no author in the line knows exactly where the story will go, chain novels tend to lead to unexpected places even to the authors that took part in the process of writing it.

Examples of chain novels include The Floating Admiral (1931) which is a detective novel written by 13 separate authors, including Agatha Christie, Dorothy L. Sayers, and Anthony Berkeley. Another example would include the novel, Wicked and Deadly, a children's fiction book written by Paul Jennings and Morris Gleitzman, who took turns writing chapters.
