= The Floating Admiral =

1931 collaborative detective novel

- First edition cover
- Author: (Detection Club) G. K. Chesterton, Agatha Christie, Dorothy L. Sayers, Ronald Knox, Freeman Wills Crofts, etc
- Language: English
- Genre: Mystery novel
- Publisher: Hodder & Stoughton
- Publication date: December 1931
- Publication place: United Kingdom
- Media type: Print (Hardback & Paperback)
- Pages: 351 pp (first edition, hardback)

The Floating Admiral is a chain-written, collaborative detective novel written by fourteen members of the British Detection Club in 1931. The twelve chapters of the story were each written by a different author, in the following sequence: Canon Victor Whitechurch, G. D. H. Cole and Margaret Cole, Henry Wade, Agatha Christie, John Rhode, Milward Kennedy, Dorothy L. Sayers, Ronald Knox, Freeman Wills Crofts, Edgar Jepson, Clemence Dane and Anthony Berkeley. G. K. Chesterton contributed a prologue, which was written after the novel had been completed.

In a literary game of consequences, each author would write one chapter, leaving G.K. Chesterton to write a typically paradoxical prologue and Anthony Berkeley to tie up all the loose ends. In addition, each of the authors provided their own solution in a sealed envelope, all of which appeared at the end of the book.

As Sayers explained in the introduction to the book, "Each writer must construct his instalment with a definite solution in view—that is, he must not introduce new complications merely 'to make it more difficult' ... [E]ach writer was bound to deal faithfully with all the difficulties left for his consideration by his predecessors."

== Literary significance and criticism ==
Notable crime fiction critic Jacques Barzun noted:-

These members of the (London) Detection Club collaborate with skill in a piece of detection rather more tight-knit than one had a right to expect. There is enough to amuse and to stimulate detection; and the Introduction by Dorothy Sayers and supplements by critics and solvers give an insight into the writers' thoughts and modes of work.

== Plot summary ==
On a drifted boat, the body of Admiral Penistone is found. Last night, he had dinner with his niece in the house of the vicar. Afterwards he used his own boat to navigate over the river to his home. However, the boat on which the admiral is found is not his property, but is owned by the vicar. The admiral was stabbed by a knife or a dagger, but there is no blood on the floor. Furthermore, the mooring line has been cut.

== List of characters ==
- Neddy Ware: a local of the village who owns a boat. He discovered the body of the Admiral, of whose crew Ware once was a part. He is known to generally be peace-loving but can have a temper and a sailor's vocabulary when roused.
- Constable Hempstead: a local police officer who was on night duty around the time of the death and spotted a mysterious figure in a car.
- Inspector Rudge: the inspector working on the case of Admiral Penistone's murder.
- Reverend (Mr) Mount: the vicar of the village, on whose boat the body of Admiral Penistone is found. His hat is found near the body. He has two sons and a runaway wife who left him for another man.
- Alec Mount: one of Reverend Mount's two sons, a sixteen-year-old.
- Peter Mount: one of Reverend Mount's two sons, a fourteen-year-old.
- Sir Wilfrid Denny: a friend of Admiral Penistone and a retired civil servant who is fond of his garden. He had ties with the Admiral in China and, strangely, rushed off to London on the morning of the discovery of the Admiral's body.
- Elma Holland (née Fitzgerald): a young woman, about thirty or a few years above that age. She wasn't beautiful, as judged by Rudge, but if she made herself up she could have been pretty. She is the niece of the Admiral and engaged to Arthur Holland. She has been in the area for a month and is of independent means.
- Arthur Holland: a young, handsome man with a slightly sunburnt face who is engaged to Elma. He is a tradesman who works with materials such as rubber, silk and jute, trading the items for China. He stayed at the Lord Marshall hotel in nearby Whynnmouth at the time of the murder. He secretly marries Elma.
- Mrs Davis: the local gossip and the proprietress of the Lord Marshall at Whynnmouth, who provides Rudge with invaluable details (mostly scandalous in nature).
- Mr Daker: a solicitor and a friend of Mr Fitzgerald (Mr Fitzgerald is the father of Elma and Admiral Penistone's brother-in-law): a dryly cautious man with a strong family feeling.
- Walter Fitzgerald: Elma's brother, an attractive young man who forged a document while working in China. He has been missing for a period of time and if he comes forward he will be arrested for the forgery - if he doesn't he will lose his father's inheritance.
