= Round-robin story =

Story written by multiple authors taking turns

A round-robin story, or simply "round robin", is a type of collaborative fiction or storytelling in which a number of authors write chapters of a novel or pieces of a story, in rounds. Round-robin novels were invented in the 19th century, and later became a tradition particularly in science fiction. In modern usage, the term often applies to collaborative fan fiction, particularly on the Internet, though it can also refer to friends or family telling stories at a sleepover, around a campfire, etc.

== See also ==
- Addventure, which combines the round robin method with gamebook narrative form
- Exquisite corpse
