= Series C banknotes =

Banknotes of the Irish pound

An example (£10 note) of the Series C Banknotes

The Series C Banknotes (Irish: Nótaí bainc sraith C) of Ireland were the final series of notes created for the state before the advent of the euro; they replaced Series B banknotes. The series gradually entered circulation from 1992 and remained in circulation until 2002.

== Banknotes ==
The notes were commissioned by the Central Bank of Ireland in five denominations. The Central Bank held a limited competition in 1991 and invited nine Irish artists, having decided on the theme previous to invitation. The designs of Robert Ballagh were chosen, and his designs were used in all the denominations to follow a unified design pattern.

The theme for this series was people who contributed to the formation of a modern Ireland, and to this effect it includes political figures, literary and religious figures.

These notes incorporated a number of sophisticated features for security, and for the partially sighted and blind; such features had not previously seen on banknotes in Ireland.

=== Five Pounds ===
The front of the note features Catherine McAuley, who founded the Sisters of Mercy; the background features the Mater Misericordiae Hospital, Dublin, which was founded by the Sisters of Mercy.

The back of the note features three children in a classroom. The first verse of the Irish poem Mise Raifteirí an File by the blind poet Antoine Ó Raifteirí is presented on the blackboard in Gaelic script. A map of Europe, without political boundaries, is at the back.

=== Ten Pounds ===
The front of the note features James Joyce; the background features Counties Dublin and Wicklow, particularly Dublin Bay.

The back of the note features one of the heads on the Custom House, Dublin by Edward Smyth. The head is one of fourteen and believed to represent the River Liffey. A nineteenth-century map and part of Finnegans Wake with Joyce's signature also feature.

=== Twenty Pounds ===
The front of the note features a portrait of 19th-century nationalist leader Daniel O'Connell, the background features his home at Derrynane Abbey, County Kerry. The brick detail in the building is '£20' printed repeatedly. This was an added security feature that was often missed by counterfeiters.

The back of the note features a "Repeal the Act of Union" pledge signed in 1845 by early Irish statesmen, with the Four Courts in the background.

=== Fifty Pounds ===
The front of the note features Douglas Hyde, Irish-language scholar and first President of Ireland; the background features Áras an Uachtaráin set against the interior of the base of the Ardagh Chalice.

The back of the note features an uilleann piper and the seal of Conradh na Gaeilge. An excerpt from a sixteenth-century manuscript kept by the Royal Irish Academy also features.

=== One Hundred Pounds ===
The front of the note features Charles Stewart Parnell; the background depicts a view of his residence Avondale House of Rathdrum, County Wicklow. A hound also features.

The back of the note features part of the Parnell Monument, O'Connell Street, Dublin. The signature of Parnell is the one which he used in response to the Home Rule Bill.

Series C (1992–2000)
Value	Dimensions (millimetres)	Main colours	Front	Reverse	First issued	Last issued
£5	120 × 64	Brown & blue	Catherine McAuley	"Mise Raifteirí an File" by Antoine Ó Raifteirí	April 1994	2000
£10	128 × 68	Green	James Joyce	River Liffey keystone with map of Dublin	September 1993	2000
£20	136 × 72	Violet	Daniel O'Connell	Pledge signed in 1845 by Daniel O'Connell	November 1992	2000
£50	144 × 76	Blue	Douglas Hyde	Piper and Seal of Conradh na Gaeilge	November 1995	2000
£100	152 × 80	Red & green	Charles Stewart Parnell	Parnell Monument in O'Connell Street, Dublin	September 1996	2000

== Sources ==
- Series C (1992/96 – 2000) Famous Irish Historical Figures
