= Collaborative fiction =

Form of writing

Collaborative fiction is a type of writing by a group of authors who share creative control of a story.

Collaborative fiction can occur for commercial gain, as part of education, or recreationally – many collaboratively written works have been the subject of a large degree of academic research.

== Process ==
Our overall process changes from book to book. Usually while I'm working on another project, Mary will come up with an idea, run it by me for my input, then get on with plotting and research. Nothing's ever set in concrete. No two books follow quite the same procedure.

— The author Bronwyn Williams

A collaborative author may focus on a specific protagonist or character in the narrative thread, and then pass the story to another writer for further additions or a change in focus to a different protagonist. Alternatively, authors might write the text for their own particular subplot within an overall narrative, in which case one author may have the responsibility of integrating the story as a whole. In Italy, various groups of authors have developed more advanced methods of interaction and production.

The methods used by commercial collaborative writers vary tremendously. When beginning writing the short story 'the toy mill' Karl Schroeder and David Nickle began by writing alternating sentences, whereas when English authors Terry Pratchett and Neil Gaiman wrote Good Omens they largely wrote separate plotlines and then collaborated much more heavily when revising the manuscript.

The collaboration may be very limited. When John Green and David Levithan wrote Will Grayson, Will Grayson the only plot point they decided on was that two characters would meet at some point in the novel and that their meeting would have a tremendous effect on their lives. After this decision, they separately wrote the first three chapters for their half and then shared them with each other. After sharing, they then "knew immediately it was going to work", as stated by Levithan.

== Debate over value of collaborative authorship ==
Some academics are concerned with being able to discover who wrote what, and which ideas belong to whom. Specifically, in the humanities collaborative authorship has been frowned upon in favor of the individual author. In these instances, antiquated ideas of individual genius influence how scholars look at issues of attribution and tenure. Collaboration scholars Ede and Lunsford note, "everyday practices in the humanities continue to ignore, or even to punish, collaboration while authorizing work attributed to (autonomous) individuals". In particular, literary-critical essays often move to "settle" questions of authorship before moving on to their central interpretive purposes. Woodmansee uses studies of writing practices since the Renaissance to conclude that the modern definition of authorship, is a 'relatively recent formation' and that previously 'more corporate and collaborative' forms of writing prevailed, suggesting a long history of Collaborative Fiction. She further argues that the concept that 'genuine authorship consists in individual acts of origination' is an entirely modern myth.

For Renaissance playwrights, collaboration appears to have been the norm; Bently notes that nearly two-thirds of plays mentioned in Henslowe's papers reflect the participation of more than one writer. There is also an issue of continuous revision: it was common practice in Renaissance English theatre for professional writers attached to a company to compose new characters, scenes, prologues and epilogues for plays in which they did not originally have a hand. Scott McMillin has exported revision as a deconstruction of authorial individuality in the Sir Thomas More manuscript.

In an artistic sense, as Lorraine York notes, "Critics and readers feel a persistent need to 'de-collaborate' these works, to parse the collective text into the separate contributions of two or more authors". This is part of a tradition in criticism to view collaboration as a subset or aberrant kind of individual authorship – such that later readers could separate out by examining the collaborative text. Particular examples of this approach to criticism include Cyrus Hoy who studies authorship in the Beaumont/Fletcher plays.

There have been several university-based projects that investigated collaborative fiction, both from a writing perspective and as a testbed for scientific techniques, such as visualization of narrative structure. Collaborative writing in smaller groups is a widespread and successful educational technique.

A Million Penguins was a large scale and completely open collaborative fiction writing sponsored by Penguin Books in 2007 that did not succeed in developing community or a cohesive narrative.

== Collaborative fiction in different countries ==
=== In Italy ===
Italy has a strong tradition in collaborative fiction: the most remarkable texts being Lo zar non è morto, a 1929 collective novel by the futurist team "Gruppo dei Dieci", Don Milani's Scuola di Barbiana experiment, Lettera a una professoressa (1967), the various historical best-sellers produced by the Wu Ming collective between 1999 and 2011, and In territorio nemico, the 115-author novel realized within the SIC – Scrittura Industriale Collettiva project founded by Gregorio Magini and Vanni Santoni, which established a codified methodology for the collective production of literary texts.

=== In Australia ===
Australia has a number of famous writing teams. In 1944 James McAuley and Harold Stewart collaborating as Ern Malley wrote seventeen poems in one day as a hoax against Max Harris and his magazine Angry Penguins. From the late 1920s to the late 1940s Flora Eldershaw and Marjorie Barnard wrote under the name of M. Barnard Eldershaw. During that time they published a body of work that included five novels. Evidently Barnard did more of the actual writing whilst Eldershaw concentrated on development and structure of the works. Louise Elizabeth Rorabacher who wrote about the collaboration stated: "that in their early collaborative novels it is impossible to distinguish their separate contributions." The partnership worked because according to Nettie Palmer, a leading literary critic of the time: "Any difference in the characters of the two women doesn't make for a difference in their point of view or values." Dymphna Cusack wrote twelve novels, two of which were collaborations. She wrote Come In Spinner, a novel set in Sydney during the end of World War II, with Florence James. The completed book was submitted and won the 1948 Daily Telegraph novel competition. Cusack also collaborated with another writer – Miles Franklin on the 1939 novel Pioneers on Parade.

Between 1997 and 2000, Australian children's authors, Paul Jennings and Morris Gleitzman, co-wrote two series of children's books, Wicked and Deadly.

This tradition has continued into the 21st century. The 2015 Australian outback novel The Painted Sky was written by a group of five Australian women, and its 2017 sequel The Shifting Light' by four authors who collaboratively write under the pseudonym Alice Campion. Their unique writing process has resulted in critics applauding their "single" author voice. As 'Group Fiction', three of the collective have also written a guide to collaborative fiction writing called How to Write Fiction as a Group. In 2020, novelist Craig Cormick collaborated with Indigenous Australian writer Harold Ludwick to write an alternative history novel, On a Barbarous Coast, about Captain Cook's 1768-1771 voyage to Australia.

== Community and educational uses ==
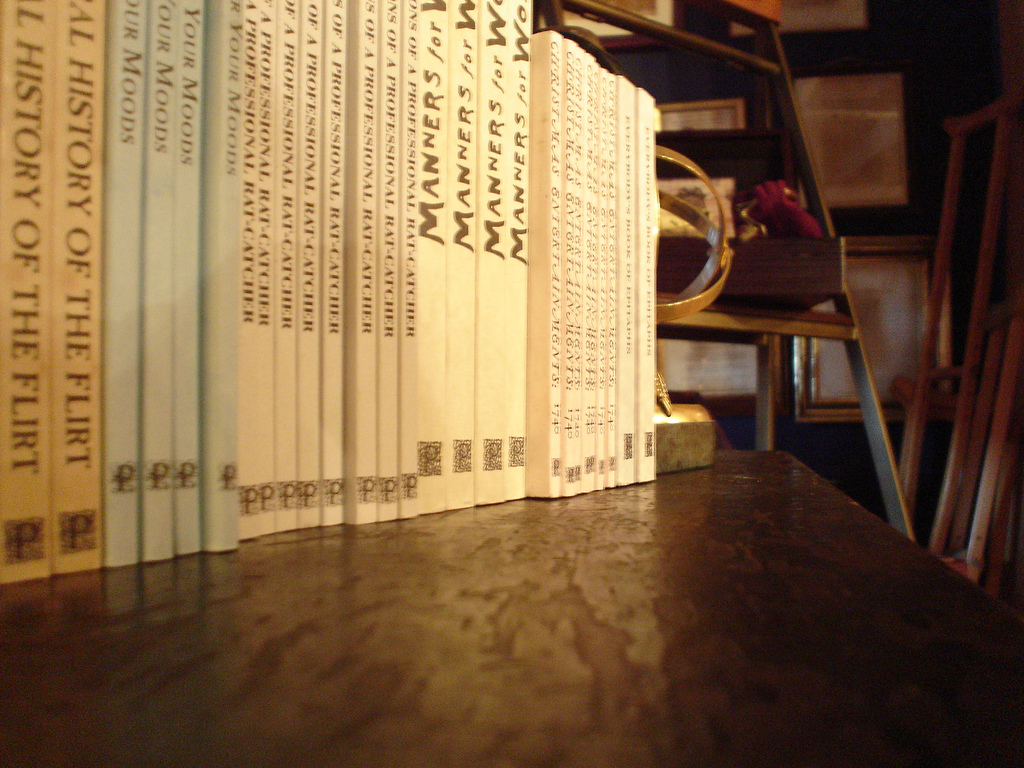
Selection of books written collaboratively as part of the 826 Valencia Project

Collaborative writing has been used to increase community engagement in writing: one of the three 2008 TED Prizes was given to Dave Eggers, partially for his work with the 826 project, which uses many collaborative techniques to engage school children, and community groups in writing. The 826 Valencia chapter consists of a writing lab, a street-front pirate supply store that partially funds the programs, and two satellite classrooms in nearby middle schools. Over 1,400 volunteers—including published authors, magazine founders, SAT-course instructors, and documentary filmmakers—have donated time to work with thousands of students since the chapter was founded. His TED Prize wish was for community members to personally engage with local public schools.

Other educationally motivated work has been developed by the University of London and used both to improve the writing skills of the participants and as a testing ground for scientific techniques, such as visualization of narrative structure. The project attempted to show students the workflow of a novel from inception to production and to improve teamwork and feedback skills. Workshops lasted up to a week and aimed to produce a full-length novel from a plot idea provided by an established author, with younger students producing smaller sized novels. Because the workshops were very short the use of collaborative writing was required so that a novel could be produced in the timeframe. Techniques from software engineering were used to arrange the workload amongst the students.

A collaborative novel written in an educational setting was Caverns, written collaboratively in 1989 as an experiment by Ken Kesey and a creative writing class that he taught at the University of Oregon. Because of Kesey's attachment to the project, the book was widely reviewed in newspapers and magazines. Critics were generally intrigued by the book but ultimately critical of its shortcomings: noting in particular the lack of a coherent voice and a too-large cast of characters. Writing in the Los Angeles Times, Bob Sipchen noted, "Caverns is an amusing lark, full of weird characters and goofy plot twists. It was a sufficiently intriguing project to make The Mainstream Media swarm around Kesey again. But no one is calling Caverns literature."

== Recreational collaborative writing ==
Collaborative fiction can be fully open with no rules or enforced structure as it moves from author to author; however, many collaborative fiction works adopt some set of rule on what constitutes an acceptable contribution.

Writing games for collaborative writing have a tradition in literary groups such as the Dadaists and the Oulipo. The advent of the internet has seen many such collaborative writing games go online, resulting both in hypertext fiction and in more conventional literary production. For example, the Baen's bar forum, known as 1632 Tech, has been a prime force behind the many works in the popular alternate history 1632 series under the aegis of Eric Flint — especially The Grantville Gazettes. Other examples of collaborative online writing include the SCP Foundation wiki and writing by the 4chan board /lit/. Author and scholar Scott Rettberg's paper "Collective Narrative" discusses connections between avant garde literary groups and online collaborative fiction.

We've done things differently with different works, For our children's book, we had a complete outline. Each of us would write one section each week, and we would revise when we met. This method worked well. By the end, you really couldn't tell who had written what.

— Lee Rouland

=== Influence of tabletop gaming ===
Other forms of collaborative fiction have evolved from the practices of tabletop and role-playing video game gamers and related 'fandom' activities. Role-playing games such as Dungeons and Dragons are often seen as a process to generate narratives through each characters interactions Such table top role-playing has always been an exercise in collaborative fiction, but can possess more structured rules: players acting out in an antisocial way can be penalised by the game mechanics (though they are just as likely to be penalised socially).

Eventually, these tabletop behaviors merged with hypertext fiction to create text-based interactive role-playing environments, like roleplaying MUSHes. In 2001, OtherSpace became the first such game to publish a novel taken from these interactions.

==== World creation ====
Ring of Fire (series) is a series of alternate history books by Eric Flint and other authors set in a universe created by Eric Flint with the intention of integrating multiple authors into the fabric of the universe structure.

Sites such as Orion's Arm and Epic Legends Of The Hierarchs: The Elemenstor Saga encourage the development of fictional universes rather than novels (though 'Epic Legends' is parody of fantasy universes).

== Online collaboration platforms ==
With the development of the internet collaborative writing is gaining new relevance with various online collaborative writing platforms emerging. Most popular are collaborative real-time editors such as Etherpad and Google Docs which are however mostly used for coordinating projects and brainstorming. Nevertheless, they have also been used to collectively write works of fiction, such as Hypersphere or The Legacy of Totalitarianism in a Tundra anonymous users of the Literature (/lit/) board of 4chan from over 71 countries using Google Docs.

== Commercial collaborations ==
Traditional fiction writers and writing circles have experimented in creating group stories, such as Robert Asprin's Thieves World and MythAdventures – such approaches date back at least as far as The Floating Admiral in 1931. There are many highly regarded collaborations, but also some collaborative work produced as spoofs or hoaxes such as Naked Came the Stranger, which was allegedly written to illustrate the point that popular American literary culture had become mindlessly vulgar. The Australian genre fiction collaborators known as Alice Campion are thought to be the first in the world to publish commercial fiction as a team of five, now four. Their popular novels, The Painted Sky (2015) and The Shifting Light (2017) were published by Penguin Random House.

=== Legal aspects ===
The disadvantages of the collaborative writing process can include problems with series or sequels to successful books, if one partner has other commitments or is bored with the project, then losses, delays and pressure on the relationship may occur. The Association of Authors' Representatives recommends that "a collaboration agreement must deal with termination of the collaboration: How the collaborators can part ways, who keeps the money, who keeps the rights to the material".

Moreover, there can be legal complications if, for example, two authors are under contract to write other books individually for different publishers – if there is any overlap on the types of books then the contractual responsibilities need to be thoroughly examined to avoid copyright problems.

== See also ==
- Collective intelligence
- Collaborative blog
- Collaborative writing
- Chain writing
- Computer-supported cooperative work
- List of novels written by multiple authors
- Mass collaboration
- Round-robin story
- Shared universe, for when authors collaborate in a setting rather than a particular storyline.
