= Victor Whitechurch =

English writer (1868–1933)

Victor Lorenzo Whitechurch
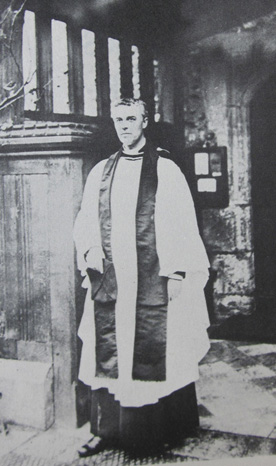
- Born: 12 March 1868; Norham, Northumberland
- Died: 25 May 1933 (aged 65); Buxton, Derbyshire
- Education: Chichester Theological College
- Occupation: Clergyman
- Writing career
- Genre: Crime fiction
- Notable work: Thrilling Stories of the Railway

Victor Lorenzo Whitechurch (12 March 1868 – 26 May 1933) was a Church of England clergyman and author.

He wrote many novels on different themes. He is probably best known for his detective stories featuring Thorpe Hazell, which featured in the Strand Magazine, Railway Magazine, Pearson's and Harmsworth's Magazines. Hazell was a vegetarian railway detective, whom the author intended to be as far from Sherlock Holmes as possible. Another character was the spy Captain Ivan Koravitch. He also wrote religious books, novels set in the church and his autobiography – Concerning Himself, The story of an ordinary man (1909).

Whitechurch's stories were admired by Ellery Queen and Dorothy L. Sayers for their "immaculate plotting and factual accuracy: he was one of the first writers to submit his manuscripts to Scotland Yard for vetting as to police procedure."

The BBC produced a series of five adaptations of short stories from Thrilling Stories of the Railway which were read by Benedict Cumberbatch.

== Career ==
Whitechurch was educated at Chichester Grammar School and Chichester Theological College. After various positions as curate he became vicar of St. Michael's, Blewbury in 1904. In 1913 he became Chaplain to the Bishop of Oxford, and an honorary canon of Christ Church. In 1918 he became Rural Dean of Aylesbury.

== Works ==
- The Chronicle of St George (1891, editor)
- The Course of Justice: A Novel (1903)
- The Canon in Residence (1904) – see summary below
- The Locum Tenens: A Novel (1906)
- The Canon's Dilemma and Other Stories (1909)
- Concerning Himself: The Story of an Ordinary Man (1909)
- Off the Main Road: A Village Comedy (1911)
- Thrilling Stories of the Railway (1912)
- Left in Charge (1912)
- A Downland Corner (1912)
- Three Summers: A Romance (1915)
- Parochial Processions: Their Value and Organisation (1917)
- The Templeton Case (1924)
- A Bishop Out of Residence (1924)
- Downland Echoes (1924)
- The Adventures of Captain Ivan Koravitch (1925)
- Concerning Right and Wrong: A Plain Man's Creed (1925)
- If Riches Increase (1923)
- The Dean and Jecinora (1926)
- The Truth in Christ Jesus (1927)
- The Crime at Diana's Pool (1927)
- Shot on the Downs (1927)
- Mixed Relations (1928) - a.k.a. The Robbery at Rudwick House
- First and Last (1929)
- Murder at the Pageant (1930)
- Murder at the College (1932) - a.k.a. Murder at Exbridge
- Mute Witnesses: Being Certain Annals of a Downland Village (1933)

=== Short stories ===
- "Peter Crane's Cigars" (Thorpe Hazell)
- "The Tragedy on the London and Mid-Northern" (Thorpe Hazell)
- "The Affair of the Corridor Express" (Thorpe Hazell)
- "Sir Gilbert Murrell's Picture" (Thorpe Hazell)
- "How the Bank Was Saved" (Thorpe Hazell)
- "The Affair of the German Dispatch-Box" (Thorpe Hazell)
- "How the Bishop Kept His Appointment" (Thorpe Hazell)
- "The Adventure of the Pilot Engine'" (Thorpe Hazell)
- "The Stolen Necklace" (Thorpe Hazell)
- "The Mystery of the Boat Express"
- "How the Express Was Saved"
- "A Case of Signaling"
- '"Winning the Race"
- "The Strikers"
- "The Ruse That Succeeded"
- "A Perilous Ride" (Captain Ivan Koravitch)
- "The Slip Coach Mystery" (Captain Ivan Koravitch)
- "In the Rockhurst Tunnel"
- "The Convict's Revenge"
- "A Warning in Red"
- "A Jump for Freedom"
- "Special Working Instructions"
- "Pierre Cournet's Last Run"
- "Between Two Fires"
- "The Triumph of Seth P. Tucker"
- "A Policy of Silence"
- "In a Tight Fix"
- "The Romance of the 'Southern Queen'"

=== The Canon in Residence (1904) ===
The Reverend John Smith is a conventional cleric, who learns on holiday he has been promoted to be Canon in Residence of Frattenbury Cathedral. While staying at a hotel he meets a fellow Englishman, who tells him the clergy are too divorced from reality. This stranger drugs Mr Smith and takes his clerical clothing, leaving in return his garish clothing, which Mr Smith is forced to wear for the rest of his holiday in St Moritz. However, because of this, he learns a great deal that the dog collar would have prevented. Meanwhile, the stranger adopts Smith's name and goes off gambling and quaffing vast quantities of champagne in Monte Carlo, to the horror of an Englishwoman there who writes to her friends in Frattenbury about him.

On returning to Frattenbury, Canon Smith champions the cause of reform, in particular improvements to slum housing to the anger of his church colleagues and the city magnates, who spread rumours of his supposed time in Monte Carlo.

He sends a £20 note he found in the stranger's jacket to someone threatened with bankruptcy. Unfortunately this turned out to be stolen in a bank robbery, and Canon Smith is embarrassed by having to admit in court how he came by the note to clear the accused.

All comes right when his friend Jane Rutland receives another letter about the "clergyman" and she is able to tip off the police to get him arrested. Canon Smith goes to the bank robber in the cells to thank him for opening his eyes to others' points of view, and shows his forgiveness. The novel ends with his engagement to Jane Rutland.

The book has been adapted for both the stage and radio.
