= Staines (surname) =

Staines is a surname. Notable people with the surname include:

- Alberto Campbell-Staines (born 1993), Jamaican-born Australian athlete
- Alfred Staines (1838–1910), British cricketer
- Bill Staines (1947–2021), American folk singer
- Charles Staines, Welsh rugby-league footballer
- Charlie Staines (born 2000), Australian-born Samoan international rugby-league footballer
- David Staines (born 1946), Canadian literary critic
- Emery Staines (1874–1959), Australian rules footballer
- Frank Staines (1876–1937), Australian rules footballer
- Gary Staines (born 1963), British long-distance runner
- Gladys Staines (born 1951), Australian missionary
- Graham Staines (1941–1999), Australian missionary
- Hubert Staines (1893–1970), Canadian politician
- John Staines, New Zealand association footballer
- Laura Staines (born 1953), American rower
- María Arias Staines (born 1941), Mexican politician
- Mavis Staines (born 1954), Canadian ballet dancer
- Michael Staines (1885–1955), Irish politician
- Mike Staines (born 1949), British-born American rower
- Paul Staines (born 1967), British political blogger
- Richard of Staines (d.1277), medieval clerical judge
- Thomas Staines (1776–1830), Royal Navy officer
- William Staines (1731–1807), the Lord Mayor of London between 1800 and 1801

== Fictional characters ==
- Mr Staines, from the 1964 film Dr. Strangelove, portrayed by Jack Creley
- Dr. Christopher Staines, from the 1873 novel A Simpleton by Charles Reade
- Elsie Staines, from the British fantasy crime drama Ashes to Ashes, portrayed by Rita Davies
- Emery Staines, from the 2013 mystery novel The Luminaries by Eleanor Catton
- George Staines, birthname of transgender character Gaynor Mason, from the British fantasy crime drama Ashes to Ashes, portrayed by Sara Stewart
- John Staines MP, from the 1993 political thriller novel To Play the King by Michael Dobbs; portrayed by Anthony Smee in its television adaption
- Monty Staines, from the British sitcom Benidorm, portrayed by John Challis
- Nikki Staines, from the American legal drama Law & Order: Special Victims Unit, portrayed by Callie Thorne
- Professor Staines, a minor character in 1933 short story Murder at Pentecost, written by Dorothy L. Sayers and featuring Montague Egg
- Richard Staines, from the 1913 short story Zero by Barry Pain; the story also involves Richard's eventual wife Jane and their son Dick
- Stanley and Mary-Jane Staines, from the Australian animated children's series Staines Down Drains; the show also included their mother, Betty Staines
