= List of works by Dorothy L. Sayers =

Works by English writer (1893–1957)

Dorothy L. Sayers bibliography
- Novels↙: 16
- Collections↙: 8
- Poems↙: 7
- Plays↙: 10
- Scripts↙: 1
- Letters↙: 5
- Translations↙: 6
- Books edited↙: 4
- Non fiction↙: 24
- Miscellany↙: 4

Dorothy Leigh Sayers (usually styled as Dorothy L. Sayers; 1893–1957) was an English crime writer, poet, playwright, essayist, translator and Christian humanist; she was also a student of classical and modern languages. She is perhaps best known for her mysteries, a series of novels and short stories, set between the First and Second World Wars, which feature Lord Peter Wimsey, an English aristocrat and amateur sleuth. Sayers herself considered her translation of Dante's Divine Comedy to be her best work.

Sayers was educated at home and then at the University of Oxford. This was unusual for a woman at the time, as women were not admitted as full members of the university until 1920—five years after Sayers had completed her first-class degree in medieval French. In 1916, a year after her graduation, Sayers published her first book, a collection of poems entitled Op. I, which she followed two years later with a second, a slim volume titled Catholic Tales and Christian Songs. The same year she was invited to edit and contribute to the annual editions of Oxford Poetry, which she did for the next three years. In 1923 she published Whose Body?, a murder mystery novel featuring the fictional Lord Peter Wimsey, and went on to write eleven novels and twenty-one short stories about the character. The Wimsey stories were popular, and successful enough for Sayers to leave the advertising agency where she was working. (Note: One of Sayers's contributions while working at the agency was the slogan "My goodness, my Guinness!")

Towards the end of the 1930s, and without explanation, Sayers stopped writing crime stories and turned instead to religious plays and essays, and to translations. Some of her plays were broadcast on the BBC, others performed at the Canterbury Festival and some in commercial theatres. During the Second World War through these plays and other works like The Wimsey Papers (1939–40) and Begin Here: A War-Time Essay (1940), Sayers "offered her countrymen a stirring argument for fighting", according to her biographer, Catherine Kenney. As early as 1929 Sayers had produced an adaptation—from medieval French—of the poem Tristan by Thomas of Britain, and in 1946 she began to produce translations of Dante, firstly the four Pietra canzoni then, from 1948, the canticas of the Divine Comedy. Her critical analyses of Dante were popular and influential among scholars and the general public, although there has been some criticism that she overstressed the comedic side of his writing to make him more popular. Sayers died in December 1957 after suffering a sudden stroke.

== Poems ==
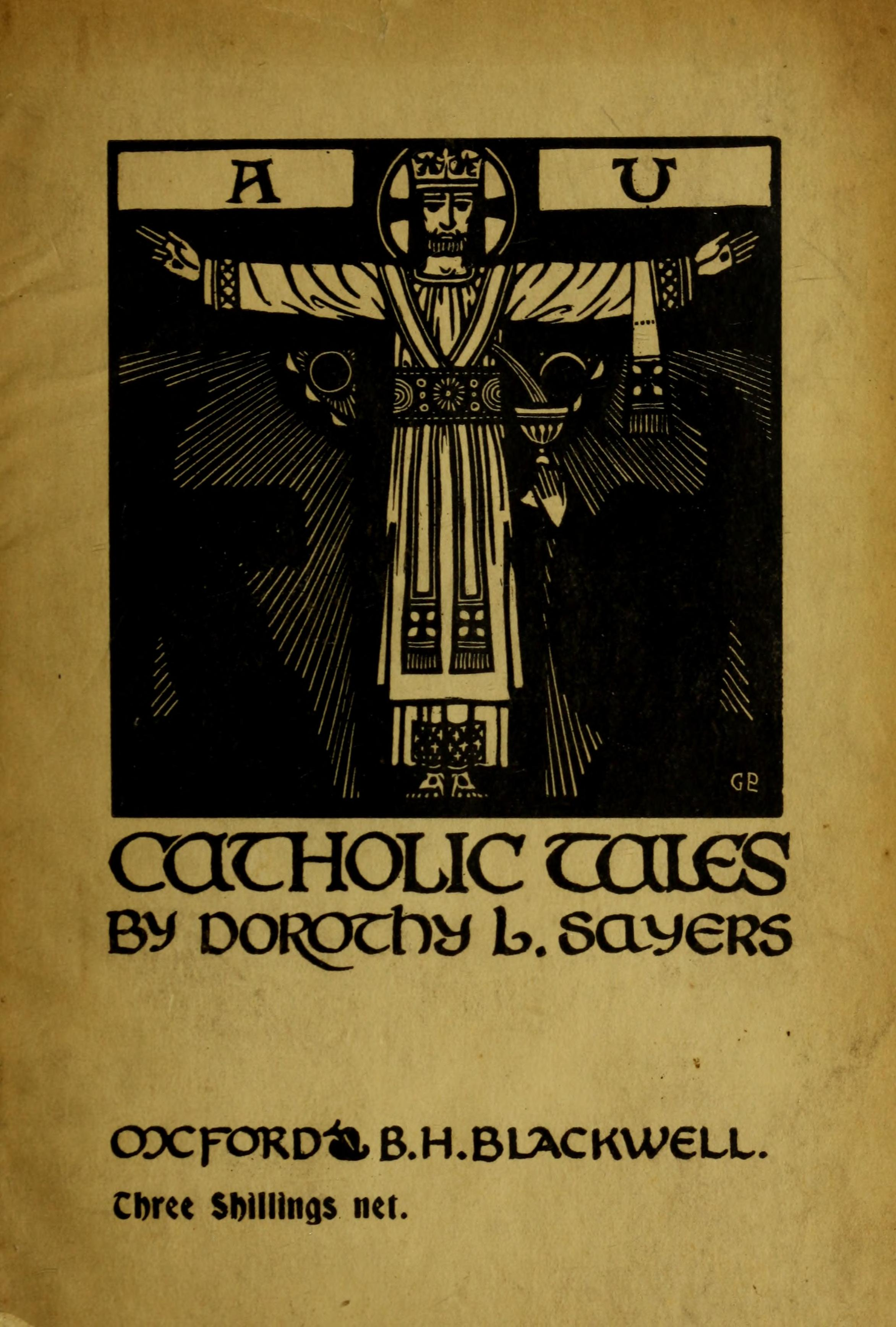
Cover of Catholic Tales and Christian Songs, 1918

Sayers's poetry
Title	Year of first publication	First edition publisher	Notes
Op. I	1916	Blackwell, Oxford	
Catholic Tales and Christian Songs	1918	Blackwell, Oxford	
Oxford Poetry, 1917	1918	Blackwell, Oxford	Contributor and editor with Wilfred Rowland Childe and T. W. Earp
Oxford Poetry, 1918	1919	Blackwell, Oxford	Contributor and editor with T. W. Earp and E. F. A. Geach
Oxford Poetry, 1919	1920	Blackwell, Oxford	Contributor and editor with T. W. Earp and Siegfried Sassoon
The Quorum	1920	The Editorial Committee, London	Contributor (two poems)
Lord, I Thank Thee	1943	Overbrook, Stamford, CT	
The Story of Adam and Christ	1955	Hamish Hamilton, London	

== Novels ==
Novels by Sayers
Title	Year of first publication	First edition publisher (London, except where stated)	Notes
Whose Body?	1923	Boni & Liveright, New York (May 1923); Unwin (October 1923)	
Clouds of Witness	1926	Unwin	
Unnatural Death	1927	Benn	Published in the US as The Dawson Pedigree
The Unpleasantness at the Bellona Club	1928	Benn	
Strong Poison	1930	Gollancz	
The Documents in the Case	1930	Benn	With Robert Eustace
The Five Red Herrings	1931	Gollancz	Published in the US as Suspicious Characters
The Floating Admiral	1931	Hodder and Stoughton	With members of The Detection Club. A chapter each was completed by: Canon Victor Whitechurch, George and Margaret Cole, Henry Wade, Agatha Christie, John Rhode, Milward Kennedy, Sayers, Ronald Knox, Freeman Wills Crofts, Edgar Jepson, Clemence Dane and Anthony Berkeley. G. K. Chesterton contributed the prologue.
Have His Carcase	1932	Gollancz	
Murder Must Advertise	1933	Gollancz	
Ask a Policeman	1933	Barker	With members of The Detection Club: Anthony Berkeley, Milward Kennedy, Gladys Mitchell, John Rhode, Sayers and Helen Simpson.
The Nine Tailors	1934	Gollancz	
Gaudy Night	1935	Gollancz	
Six against the Yard	1936	Selwyn and Blount	With members of The Detection Club: Margery Allingham, Anthony Berkeley, Freeman Wills Crofts, Father Ronald Knox, Sayers and Russell Thorndike.
Busman's Honeymoon: A Love Story With Detective Interruptions	1937	Harcourt Brace	Adapted from the play Busman's Honeymoon (1936)
Double Death: a Murder Story	1939	Gollancz	With members of The Detection Club

== Short story collections ==
Sayers contributed to numerous short story anthologies, but also published a number of collections of her own works.

Sayers's short story collections
Title	Year of first publication	First edition publisher (All London)	Notes
Lord Peter Views the Body	1928	Gollancz	All stories feature Lord Peter Wimsey Includes: The Abominable History of the Man with Copper Fingers, The Entertaining Episode of the Article in Question, The Fascinating Problem of Uncle Meleager's Will, The Fantastic Horror of the Cat in the Bag, The Unprincipled Affair of the Practical Joker, The Undignified Melodrama of the Bone of Contention, The Vindictive Story of the Footsteps That Ran, The Bibulous Business of a Matter of Taste, The Learned Adventure of the Dragon's Head, The Piscatorial Farce of the Stolen Stomach, The Unsolved Puzzle of the Man with No Face and The Adventure of the Cave of Ali Baba
Hangman's Holiday	1933	Gollancz	Includes: Featuring Lord Peter Wimsey: "The Image in the Mirror", The Incredible Elopement of Lord Peter Wimsey, The Queen's Square, The Necklace of Pearls; Featuring Montague Egg: The Poisoned Dow '08, Sleuths on the Scent, Murder in the Morning, One Too Many, Murder at Pentecost, Maher-Shalal-Hashbaz; Featuring neither: The Man Who Knew How and The Fountain Plays
In the Teeth of the Evidence and Other Mysteries	1939	Gollancz	Includes: Featuring Lord Peter Wimsey: In the Teeth of the Evidence, Absolutely Elsewhere; Featuring Montague Egg: A Shot at Goal, Dirt Cheap, Bitter Almonds, False Weight, The Professor's Manuscript; Featuring neither: The Milk-Bottles, Dilemma, An Arrow o'er the House, Scrawns, Nebuchadnezzar, The Inspiration of Mr. Budd, Blood Sacrifice, Suspicion, The Leopard Lady and the Cyprian Cat
A Treasury of Sayers Stories	1958	Gollancz	
Talboys	1972	Harper	Includes: All featuring Lord Peter Wimsey: Striding Folly, The Haunted Policeman, and Talboys
Lord Peter: A Collection of All the Lord Peter Wimsey Stories	1972	Harper	Includes: The Abominable History of the Man with Copper Fingers, The Entertaining Episode of the Article in Question, The Fascinating Problem of Uncle Meleager's Will, The Fantastic Horror of the Cat in the Bag, The Unprincipled Affair of the Practical Joker, The Undignified Melodrama of the Bone of Contention, The Vindictive Story of the Footsteps That Ran, The Bibulous Business of a Matter of Taste, The Learned Adventure of the Dragon's Head, The Piscatorial Farce of the Stolen Stomach, The Unsolved Puzzle of the Man with No Face, The Adventure of the Cave of Ali Baba (all from Lord Peter Views the Body), The Image in the Mirror, The Incredible Elopement of Lord Peter Wimsey, The Queen's Square, The Necklace of Pearls (all from Hangman's Holiday), In the Teeth of the Evidence, Absolutely Elsewhere (both from In the Teeth of the Evidence and Other Mysteries), Striding Folly and The Haunted Policeman (both from Talboys).: Also includes "Sayers, Lord Peter and God" by Carolyn Heilbrun and "Greedy Night, A Parody" by E. C. Bentley.
Striding Folly	1972	New English Library	Includes: All featuring Lord Peter Wimsey: Striding Folly, The Haunted Policeman and Talboys
The Scoop and Behind the Screen	1983	Gollancz	Two collaborative detective serials written by members of the Detection Club which were broadcast weekly by their authors on the BBC National Programme in 1930 and 1931 with the scripts then being published in The Listener a week after broadcast.
Crime on the Coast and No Flowers by Request	1984	Gollancz	Two collaborative detective serials written by members of the Detection Club; originally published in Daily Sketch (1953)
The Complete Stories	2002	Perennial	Includes all short stories from Lord Peter Views the Body, Hangman's Holiday, In the Teeth of the Evidence and Other Mysteries, Talboys and Lord Peter: A Collection of All the Lord Peter Wimsey Stories

== Editor ==
Works of which Sayers was the editor
Title	Year of first publication	First edition publisher (All London)	Notes
Great Short Stories of Detection, Mystery and Horror	1928	Gollancz	
Great Short Stories of Detection, Mystery and Horror: Second Series	1931	Gollancz	
Great Short Stories of Detection, Mystery and Horror: Third Series	1934	Gollancz	
Tales of Detection	1936	J.M. Dent	As part of the Everyman's Library series

== Translation ==
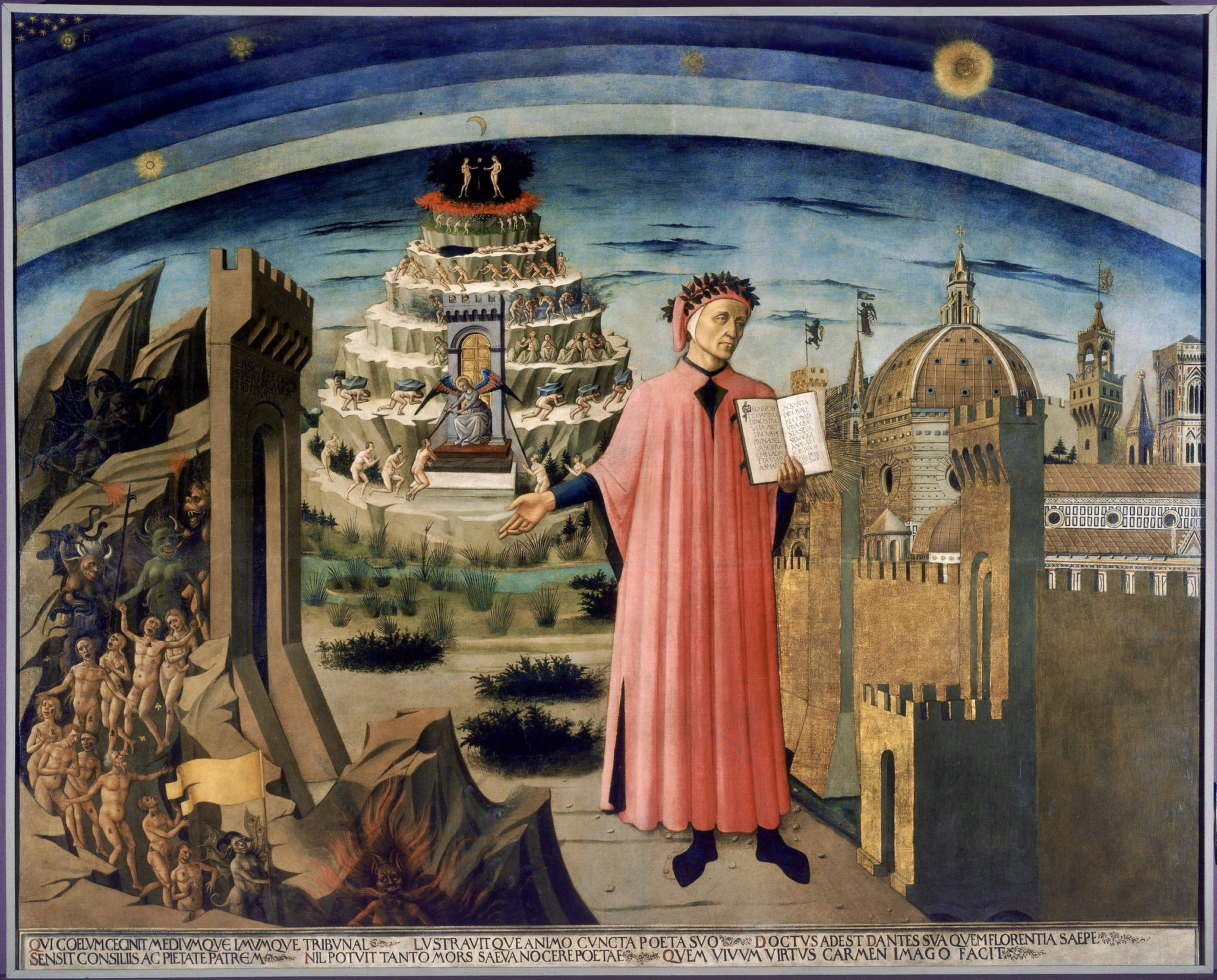
Dante shown holding a copy of the Divine Comedy, next to the entrance to Hell, the seven terraces of Mount Purgatory and the city of Florence, with the spheres of Heaven above, in Michelino's fresco

Translations by Sayers
Title	Year of first publication	First edition publisher (London, unless otherwise stated)	Notes
Tristan in Brittany, Being Fragments of the Romance of Tristan, Written in the Twelfth Century by Thomas the Anglo-Norman	1929	Benn	Translation of the Old French poem Tristan by Thomas of Britain
The Heart of Stone, Being the Four Canzoni of the "Pietra" Group by Dante	1946	J.H. Clarke, Witham, Essex	Translation of four pietra canzoni (translates from the Italian as: "stone songs") by Dante Alighieri
The "Comedy" of Dante Alighieri the Florentine. Cantica I: Hell	1949	Penguin, Harmondsworth	Translation of cantica 1 of Divine Comedy by Dante Alighieri
The "Comedy" of Dante Alighieri the Florentine. Cantica II: Purgatory	1955	Penguin, Harmondsworth	Translation of cantica 2 of Divine Comedy by Dante Alighieri
The Song of Roland	1957	Penguin, Harmondsworth	Translation of The Song of Roland
The "Comedy" of Dante Alighieri the Florentine. Cantica III: Paradise	1962	Penguin, Harmondsworth	Translation of cantica 3 of Divine Comedy by Dante Alighieri, with Barbara Reynolds completing the last third

== Scripts and plays ==
Scripts and plays by Sayers
Title	Location of first performance London, unless otherwise stated	Date of first performance	Notes
The Silent Passenger	See note	1935	Screenplay; with Basil Mason; adapted from Sayers's unpublished short story of the same title (Note: Produced by Phoenix Films in 1935.)
Busman's Honeymoon: A Detective Comedy in Three Acts	Comedy Theatre	16 December 1936	With Muriel St. Clare Byrne
The Zeal of Thy House	Canterbury Festival	12 June 1937	Four scenes
He That Should Come: A Nativity Play in One Act	See note	25 December 1938	Radio play, first broadcast on the BBC
The Devil to Pay: Being the Famous History of John Faustus, the Conjurer of Wittenberg in Germany: How He Sold His Immortal Soul to the Enemy of Mankind, and Was Served Twenty- four Years by Mephistopheles, and Obtained Helen of Troy to His Paramour, With Many Other Marvels; and How God Dealt With Him at the Last	Canterbury Festival	10 June 1939	Four Scenes
Love All	Torch Theatre	10 April 1940	
The Golden Cockerel	See note	27 December 1941	Radio play; first broadcast on the BBC. Adapted from the story of the same title by Alexander Pushkin
The Man Born to Be King: A Play-Cycle on the Life of Our Lord and Saviour Jesus Christ	See note	December 1941	Twelve-episode radio series; first broadcast on the BBC between December 1941 and October 1942
The Just Vengeance	The Lichfield Festival	15 June 1946	
Where Do We Go from Here?	See note	1948	With members of the Detection Club. Radio play, first broadcast for the Mystery Playhouse series on the BBC
The Emperor Constantine: A Chronicle	Playhouse Theatre, Colchester	3 July 1951	

== Miscellany ==
Sayers wrote numerous essays, poems and stories which appeared in several publications, including Time and Tide, The Times Literary Supplement, Atlantic Monthly, Punch, The Spectator and the Westminster Gazette; in the last of these she was the author of a poem under the pseudonym H.P. Rallentando. She also wrote several book reviews for The Sunday Times.

Other works by Sayers
Title	Year	Publisher	Notes
Papers Relating to the Family of Wimsey	1936	Privately printed	As Matthew Wimsey; co-written with others
An Account of Lord Mortimer Wimsey, the Hermit of the Wash	1937	Privately printed	
The Wimsey Papers	24 November 1939 – 26 January 1940	Published in serial form in The Spectator	
The Wimsey Family: A Fragmentary History Compiled from Correspondence With Dorothy L. Sayers	1977	Harper	Compiled by C.W. Scott-Giles
Taking Detective Stories Seriously: The Collected Crime Reviews of Dorothy L. Sayers	2017	Tippermuir Books	Compiled by Martin Edwards

== Non fiction ==
Sayers's non fictional work
Title	Year of first publication	First edition publisher (London, unless otherwise stated)	Notes
The Murder of Julia Wallace	1936	John Lane, The Bodley Head	included in The Anatomy of Murder by The Detection Club
The Greatest Drama Ever Staged	1938	Hodder & Stoughton	Essays; contains "The Greatest Drama Ever Staged" and "The Triumph of Easter", both of which were published in The Sunday Times, April 1938
Strong Meat	1939	Hodder & Stoughton	Essays
Begin Here: A War-Time Essay	1940	Gollancz	Essays
Creed or Chaos? and Other Essays in Popular Theology	1940	Hodder & Stoughton	Essays
The Mind of the Maker	1941	Methuen	Essays
The Mysterious English	1941	Macmillan	
Why Work?	1942	Methuen	Subtitle: An Address Delivered at Eastbourne, April 23rd, 1942
The Other Six Deadly Sins	1943	Methuen	Subtitle: An Address Given to the Public Morality Council at Caxton Hall, Westminster, on October 23rd, 1941
Even the Parrot: Exemplary Conversations for Enlightened Children	1944	Methuen	
Making Sense of the Universe	1946	St. Anne's Church House	Subtitle: An Address Given at the Kingsway Hall on Ash Wednesday, March 6th, 1946
Unpopular Opinions	1946	Gollancz	Essays
The Lost Tools of Learning	1948	Methuen	
The Days of Christ's Coming	1953	Hamish Hamilton	
Introductory Papers on Dante	1954	Methuen	Criticism
The Story of Easter	1955	Hamish Hamilton	
The Story of Noah's Ark	1956	Hamish Hamilton	
Further Papers on Dante	1957	Methuen	Criticism
The Great Mystery of Life Hereafter	1957	Hodder & Stoughton	Essays; contributor, with others
The Poetry of Search and the Poetry of Statement, and Other Posthumous Essays on Literature, Religion and Language	1963	Gollancz	Essays
Christian Letters to a Post-Christian World: A Selection of Essays	1969	Eerdmans, Grand Rapids, MI	Essays; selected and introduced by Roderick Jellema
Are Women Human?	1971	Eerdmans, Grand Rapids, MI	Essays
A Matter of Eternity: Selections From the Writings of Dorothy L. Sayers	1973	Eerdmans, Grand Rapids, MI	Essays
Wilkie Collins: A Critical and Biographical Study	1977	Friends of the University of Toledo Library, Toledo, OH	
Spiritual Writings	1993	Cowley, Cambridge, MA	

== Letters ==
Sayers's letter collections
Title	Year	Publisher	Notes
The Letters of Dorothy L. Sayers: 1899–1936: The Making of a Detective Novelist	1995	Hodder & Stoughton	
The Letters of Dorothy L. Sayers: 1937–1943, From Novelist to Playwright	1998	The Dorothy L Sayers Society	
The Letters of Dorothy L. Sayers: 1944–1950, A Noble Daring	1999	The Dorothy L Sayers Society	
The Letters of Dorothy L. Sayers: 1951–1957, In the Midst of Life	2000	The Dorothy L Sayers Society	
The Letters of Dorothy L. Sayers: Child and Woman of Her Time	2002	The Dorothy L Sayers Society	A supplement to the letters

== Notes and references ==
=== Sources ===
- Benstock, Bernard (1985). "Dorothy L. Sayers". In Stayley, Thomas F. (ed.). Dictionary of Literary Biography: British Novelists, 1890–1929: Modernists. Detroit: Gale. ISBN 978-0-8103-1714-7.
- Gunn, Katharine (June 1998). "Dorothy L. Sayers". Book and Magazine Collector (171). Diamond Publishing Group.
- Howard, David (April 2004). "The Lord Peter Wimsey Books". Book and Magazine Collector (241). Diamond Publishing Group.
- Kenney, Catherine (2004). "Sayers [married name Fleming], Dorothy Leigh". Oxford Dictionary of National Biography (online ed.). Oxford University Press. doi:10.1093/ref:odnb/35966. (Subscription, Wikipedia Library access or UK public library membership required.)
- Stock, R.D. (1990). "Dorothy L. Sayers". In Bruccoli, Matthew J. (ed.). Dictionary of Literary Biography: Modern British Essayists. Detroit: Gale. ISBN 978-0-8103-1714-7.
