= Robert Bennett (cricketer) =

English cricketer (1831–1875)

Personal information
- Born: 1831; Tunbridge Wells, Kent
- Died: 5 October 1875 (aged 43–44); Chichester, Sussex
- Role: Wicket-keeper

Domestic team information
- Years: Team
- 1860: Sussex
- 1863–1864: Kent

Career statistics
Competition	First-class
Matches	7
Runs scored	35
Batting average	2.50
100s/50s	0/0
Top score	12
Catches/stumpings	9/2
- Source: CricInfo, 24 January 2012

Robert Bennett (1831 – 5 October 1875) was an English cricketer who played first-class cricket as a wicket-keeper during the 1860s.

Bennett was born on the Nevill estate at Tunbridge Wells in Kent in 1831, the son of gardener George Bennett and his wife Mary. Bennett later worked as a gardener for Edward Vesey Bligh, as well as a labourer and at a waterworks in Brighton.

Bennett played club cricket from as early as 1851, including for Tonbridge and Tunbridge Wells teams. He made his first-class cricket debut for Sussex County Cricket Club against Marylebone Cricket Club (MCC) at Lord's in 1860. This was his only first-class appearance for Sussex, and in 1863 he made his Kent debut, replacing Alfred Staines as wicket-keeper for the Canterbury Cricket Week match against an England XI.

The following season, Bennett again replaced Staines after three heavy Kent defeats, playing in five matches for the county team. He scored a total of 35 runs in first-class matches, with a highest score of 12 runs made against Nottinghamshire at Crystal Palace. In his memoirs, Lord Harris described Bennett as "a big man" who "did not justify his selection" as Kent's wicket-keeper.

Bennett died at Chichester in Sussex in 1875 aged 43 or 44.

== Bibliography ==
- Carlaw, Derek (2020). Kent County Cricketers, A to Z: Part One (1806–1914) (PDF). Cardiff: ACS.
