= Leslie Seth-Smith =

British author, screenwriter

Leslie James Seth-Smith (12 January 1923 – 5 November 2007), known as James Brabazon, was a screenwriter and the author of two well-received biographies of Albert Schweitzer and Dorothy L. Sayers. He also compiled and translated some of Albert Schweitzer's writings in Albert Schweitzer: Essential Writings.

He died on 5 November 2007 after a short illness due to lung cancer.

His uncle David Seth-Smith was known as the "Zoo man", and his great-grandfather was Seth Smith, who built large proportions of Belgravia & Mayfair in the West End of London, in the mid 19th century.
