= The Image in the Mirror =

"The Image in the Mirror" is a short story by Dorothy L. Sayers, featuring Lord Peter Wimsey and published as the first story in Hangman's Holiday in 1933.

== Plot summary ==
This story is notable for its inaccurate depiction of right/left mirror image twins, and more generally for its use of popular science to explore the subject of inversion.

A man who states that his body is a mirror image of the normal body plan confesses to Lord Peter Wimsey that he is worried he is going mad, due to blackouts in which he (or somebody identical to him) has committed crimes.

Wimsey states that as soon as he heard that the man was a mirror image he knew there must be an identical twin who was the other, 'right' half, briefly mentioning experiments with salamander eggs to back up this claim. This reference is to genuine experiments, pioneering knowledge about the chemical gradient that exists in all mammalian embryos, defining the development of front versus back, top versus bottom and left versus right. Though it is possible to have mirror image twins, in fact this is a very rare occurrence, and not a near certainty as described in the story.

Having deduced the existence of the evil twin it was an easy matter to find and arrest him, freeing the good twin from the shadow of his evil twin's misdeeds.

The story's solution involves a revelation about an unmarried woman who secretly gave birth and let her child be raised by a relative – which Sayers herself did in real life, though this was unknown to the public at the time when the story was published.
