= Percival Leigh =

English satirist & comic writer (1813-1889)

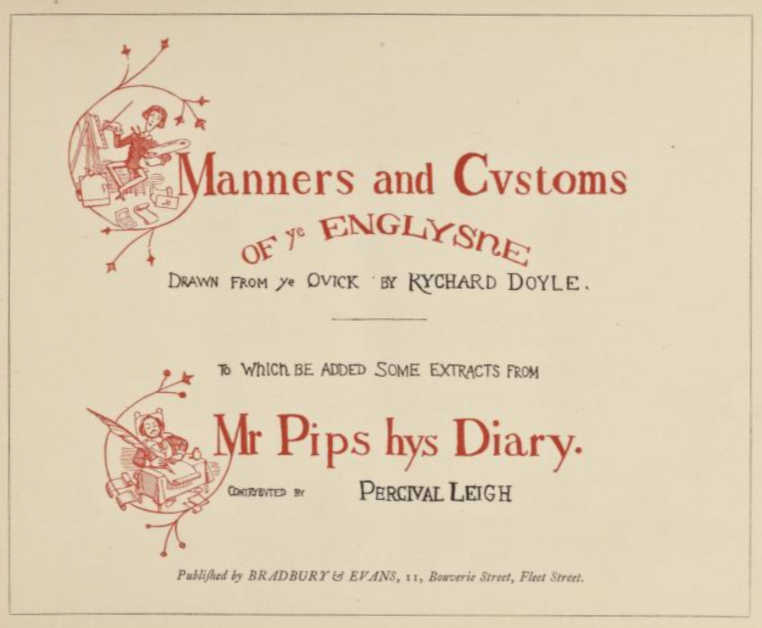
Collaboration between Leigh and Richard Doyle, 1849

Percival Leigh (3 November 1813 – 24 October 1889), was an English satirist and comic writer, known as one of the founding contributors to the magazine Punch, where he was deputy to the editor, Mark Lemon. He collaborated with cartoonists including John Leech and Richard Doyle and was the last survivor of the original Punch contributors.

== Life and career ==
Leigh was born in Haddington, Scotland, and trained for the medical profession at St Bartholomew's Hospital, London. There he became a close friend of the illustrator John Leech. They both passed their professional examinations and qualified as doctors in 1835, but found comic literature more to their liking. They collaborated in 1840 on three books: The Comic Latin Grammar, The Comic English Grammar, and The Fiddle-Faddle Fashion Book. A fourth book, Portraits of Children of the Mobility, appeared in 1841. Its popularity caused Leigh and Leech to be recruited to Punch when it was set up later in that year.

Leigh was named deputy editor under Mark Lemon, but when the latter died in 1870 Leigh failed to succeed him, being beaten to the post by Shirley Brooks. When Brooks died in 1874 after four years as editor, Leigh was expected to be appointed, but Tom Taylor was preferred.

Leigh's best-known work appeared in book form in 1849: Ye manners and customs of ye Englyshe: drawn from ye quick by Richard Doyle, to which be added some extracts from Mr. Pips his Diary. Doyle's cartoons had appeared weekly in Punch and for the book Leigh added commentary in the style of Pepys's Diary. A biographical sketch of Leigh published in 1892 comments that the book "owes much to Doyle's illustrations; but Leigh's application of ancient phraseology to affairs of an essentially modern character, such as a shareholders' meeting, made a decided hit. It is a clever, sarcastic chronicle of prevailing fashions and opinions".

Leigh retired to Oak Cottage, Hammersmith, where he died on 24 October 1889. He was the last survivor of the early writers in Punch. His wife, Letitia Morrison, predeceased him.

== Sources ==
- Lee, Sidney (1892). Dictionary of National Biography. Vol. 32. London: Macmillan.
