= Ariela Freedman =

Professor at Concordia University

- Born: Brooklyn, New York
- Occupations: Professor, author
- Website: https://thephilosophicalbrothel.wordpress.com/

Ariela Freedman is a professor at Concordia University and author of several books.

Freedman was born in Brooklyn, earned her Bachelor's degree at Concordia, and returned to New York to earn her PhD at New York University. She would become the Principal of Concordia's College of Liberal Arts.

Her "Death, Men, and Modernism: Trauma and Narrative in British Fiction from Hardy to Woolf" (2014) was a book of literary criticism. It focussed on Thomas Hardy, E. M. Forster, D. H. Lawrence, Ford Madox Ford, Virginia Woolf and Katherine Mansfield.

Her 2017 book, Arabic for Beginners, was a novel, in spite of the name; it is an account of a woman who joined her husband in Israel and found a friendship with a Palestinian woman, which induced her to learn Arabic.

The Montreal Review of Books described her 2019 book, A Joy to be Hidden, as showing "haunting power". The book's hero comes of age in grad school in New York City in the 1990s.

Freedman has given public lectures on authors who have written about the holocaust, like Molly Applebaum.
