= In the Teeth of the Evidence =

1939 short story collection by Dorothy Sayers

First edition

In the Teeth of the Evidence is a collection of short stories by Dorothy L. Sayers first published by Victor Gollancz in 1939. The book's title is taken from the first story in the collection.

== Contents ==
- Lord Peter Wimsey stories:
  - "In the Teeth of the Evidence" – A dentist is poisoned and dies in a car fire, supposedly by suicide or accident, but Wimsey suspects murder and identity fraud.
  - "Absolutely Elsewhere" – Wealthy debt-collector Mr. Grimbold is murdered, but all the suspects have alibis related to a series of phone calls, which Wimsey and Parker must unravel.
- Montague Egg stories:
  - "A Shot at Goal" – Mr. Egg is drawn into a murder mystery revolving around a heated football controversy.
  - "Dirt Cheap" – A fellow traveling salesman is murdered for his jewelry case, and the evidence of Mr. Egg's clock helps to avenge him.
  - "Bitter Almonds" – An old gentleman's death causes great embarrassment for Mr. Egg when one of his own wines is involved.
  - "False Weight" – Mr. Egg investigates another fellow traveling salesman's death, this time with bigamy as the motive.
  - "The Professor's Manuscript" – Ill-fitting false teeth and a strange set of old books tip Mr. Egg off that something is not right with one of his new clients.
- Other stories:
  - "The Milk-Bottles" – A terrible smell and accumulating milk bottles cause neighbors to think a quarrelsome neighbor has murdered his wife.
  - "Dilemma" – Two men exchange stories of doubt, one a doctor who saved a vital manuscript on sleeping sickness instead of a drunken butler in a fire, and the other a detective who saved a child in a fire instead of evidence that would save an innocent man.
  - "An Arrow O'er the House" – A devoted secretary and her author employer find themselves embroiled in a mystery eerily similar to something he wrote.
  - "Scrawns" – A young lady is given a job in a house with some terrifying fellow servants.
  - "Nebuchadnezzar" – An elaborate, Biblical-themed game of charades causes a man with a guilty secret to suspect someone knows what he has done.
  - "The Inspiration of Mr. Budd"- An impoverished hairdresser desperate for clients must make a terrible choice when he realizes his latest client is a wanted murderer.
  - "Blood Sacrifice" – A playwright tricked by a legal contract into drastically altering his beloved script finds himself in the position of having to save the life of the man who deceived him.
  - "Suspicion" – A man suspects a woman of murder but has no proof.
  - "The Leopard Lady" – A sinister removal van sparks a mystery.
  - "The Cyprian Cat" – A supernatural story in which a man who fears cats encounters a woman who behaves like one, and a strange feral cat that seems to be haunting him.
