= Montague Egg =

- First appearance: The Poisoned Dow '08
- Last appearance: The Professor's Manuscript
- Created by: Dorothy L. Sayers

In-universe information
- Gender: Male
- Occupation: Salesman
- Nationality: English

Montague Egg is a fictional amateur detective, who appears in eleven short stories by Dorothy L. Sayers.

Unlike Sayers's better-known creation, Lord Peter Wimsey, Egg does not actively pursue investigations. Usually, he is witness to the discovery of a murdered body, or links a casual observation with a recent newspaper headline proclaiming some crime. He is, in his own words, "Monty-on-the-spot". The plots are typically neat puzzles with less personal content than the Wimsey stories, although Egg himself emerges as a memorable and likeable character.

By occupation, Egg is a travelling salesman for an importer and distributor of fine wines and spirits (Wimsey is a well-known connoisseur of the same). His knowledge of all aspects of the vintner's trade is useful in determining the exact circumstances of several cases of poisoning. Through regular contact with other commercial travellers, he has also gained a smattering of knowledge of several other lines of business: enough, for example, to determine (in "A Shot at Goal") that a threatening letter was written by someone connected with the printing trade rather than by a garage mechanic with a grievance, from a peculiarity of the handwriting.

Egg is described (in "One Too Many") as a fair-haired, well-mannered young man, and elsewhere as being slightly portly also. He is not mentioned as being married, or having any romantic attachments or inclinations.

He has a habit of quoting maxims from The Salesman's Handbook, "his favourite book", such as:

A cheerful voice and cheerful look
put orders in the order-book.

He frequently fortifies himself at various stages in criminal investigations by falling back on these proverbs. He even invents such rhymes for future reference; for example, in "Murder at Pentecost" he makes up and memorises "To call an Oxford man an undergrad, proclaims you a bounder and a cad", to ensure he does not contravene an obscure point of University etiquette ("undergrad" vs the more acceptable "undergraduate").

Egg periodically expresses admiration for the up-to-date, and in "Murder in the Morning" comments, of a prefabricated garage: "That's the stuff.... Standardisation means immense saving in labour, time, expense." He also uses the commercial clichés of the time. All this gives an impression somewhat different from Lord Peter Wimsey, and there may be an element of deliberate contrast.

Sayers had a profound knowledge of the advertising world, as evidenced in Murder Must Advertise, and the milieu of Egg is derivable from this expertise and knowledge.

== List of Montague Egg stories ==
- Hangman's Holiday:
  - The Poisoned Dow '08
  - Sleuths on the Scent
  - Murder in the Morning
  - One Too Many
  - Murder at Pentecost
  - Maher-shalal-hashbaz
- In the Teeth of the Evidence:
  - A Shot at Goal
  - Dirt Cheap
  - Bitter Almonds
  - False Weight
  - The Professor's Manuscript

== Maxims from The Salesman's Handbook ==
- Maxim No. 01 – To serve the public is the aim of every salesman worth the name
- It's useless to bluster and say "No, no", when it's perfectly clear that the facts are so
- Don't let the smallest chance slip by; you never know until you try
- If you're a salesman worth the name at all, you can sell razors to a billiard ball
- Maxim No. 05 – The hardest problem's easy of solution when each one makes his little contribution
- Whether you're wrong or whether you're right, it's always better to be polite
- Ready to learn means ready to earn
- The haberdasher gets the golfer's trade by talking, not of buttons, but of Braid
- Account with rigid honesty for £ and s and even d
- Maxim No. 10 – The goodwill of the maid is nine-tenths of the trade
- Don't trust to luck but be exact, and certify the smallest fact
- The salesman with the open eye sees commissions mount up high
- Don't wait for unpleasant disclosures to burst. If the truth must be told, see you tell it first
- The salesman who will use his brains will spare himself a world of pains
- Well-kept hands that please the sight, seize the trade and hold it tight, but bitten nails and grubby claws well may give the buyer pause
- Discretion plays a major part in making up the salesman's art, for truths that no one can believe are calculated to deceive
- The salesman's job is to get the trade – don't leave the house till the deal is made (Monty's motto)
- Attend to details and you'll make your sale – a little weight will often turn the scale
- Never miss a chance of learning for that word spells "£" plus "earning"
- When it's a question of stamps to lick, the office-boy knows most of the trick
- If accidents happen and you are to blame, takes steps to avoid repetition of same
- To call an Oxford man an undergrad proclaims you an outsider and a cad (added by Egg)
