= Dorothy L. Sayers =

English novelist, translator and Christian writer (1893–1957)

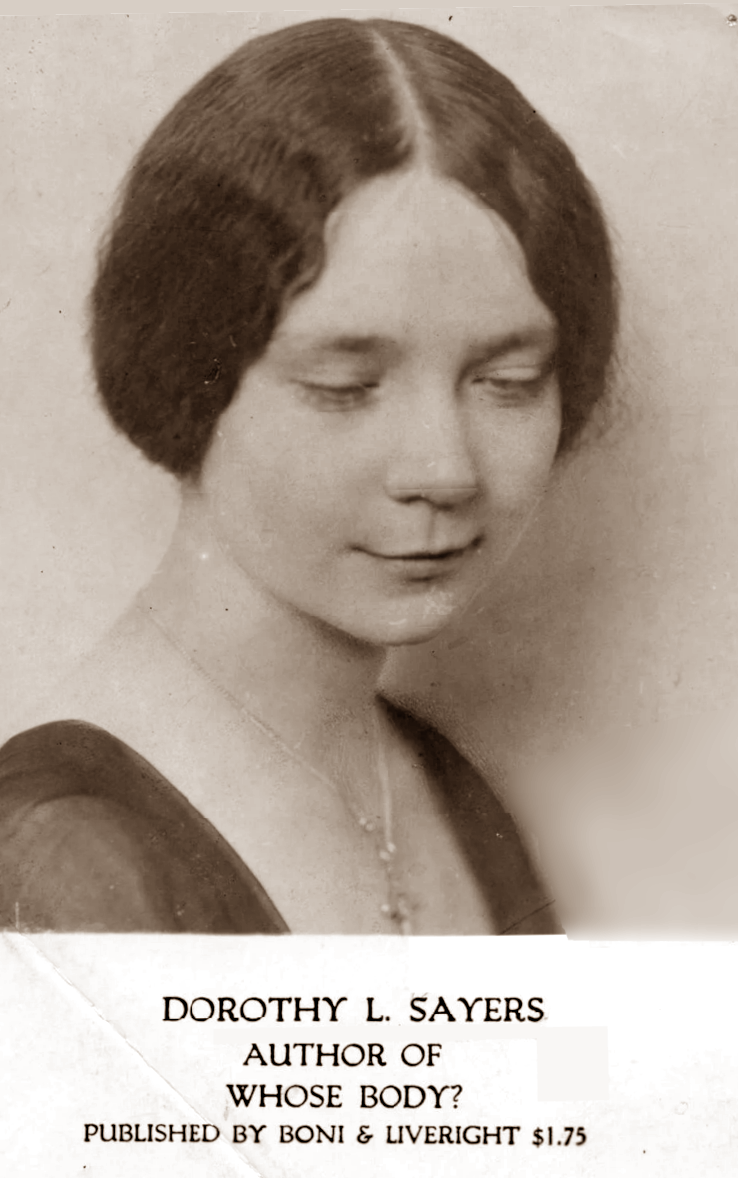
- 1925 press photograph
- Born: Dorothy Leigh Sayers; 13 June 1893; Oxford, England
- Died: 17 December 1957 (aged 64); Witham, Essex, England
- Education: Somerville College, Oxford
- Occupations: Novelist; playwright; critic
- Spouse: Oswald Arthur "Mac" Fleming (Note: Fleming's birth name was "Oswald Arthur Fleming", but he adopted and used the name Atherton Fleming; friends knew him as "Mac".) (m. 1926; died 1950)
- Children: 1
- Writing career
- Genres: Crime fiction; Translation of Dante; Christian writings

Dorothy Leigh Sayers (/sɛərz/ SAIRZ; (Note: Often pronounced /ˈseɪ.ərz/ SAY-ərz, but Sayers preferred /sɛərz/ SAIRZ and encouraged the use of her middle initial to facilitate this pronunciation.) 13 June 1893 – 17 December 1957) was an English crime novelist, playwright, translator and critic.

Born in Oxford, Sayers was brought up in rural East Anglia and educated at Godolphin School in Salisbury and Somerville College, Oxford, graduating with first-class honours in medieval French. She worked as an advertising copywriter between 1922 and 1929 before success as an author brought her financial independence. Her first novel, Whose Body?, was published in 1923. Between then and 1939 she wrote ten more novels featuring the upper-class amateur sleuth Lord Peter Wimsey. In 1930, in Strong Poison, she introduced a leading female character, Harriet Vane, the object of Wimsey's affection. Harriet appears sporadically in future novels, resisting Lord Peter's proposals of marriage until Gaudy Night in 1935, six novels later.

Sayers moved the genre of detective fiction away from pure puzzles lacking characterisation or depth and became recognised as one of the four "Queens of Crime" of the Golden Age of Detective Fiction of the 1920s and 1930s, along with Agatha Christie, Margery Allingham and Ngaio Marsh. She was a founder member of the Detection Club and worked with many of its members in producing novels and radio serials collaboratively, such as the novel The Floating Admiral in 1931.

From the mid‐1930s Sayers wrote plays, mostly on religious themes; they were performed in English cathedrals and broadcast by the BBC. Her radio dramatisation of the life of Jesus, The Man Born to Be King (1941–42), initially provoked controversy but was quickly recognised as an important work. From the early 1940s her main preoccupation was translating the three books of Dante's Divine Comedy into colloquial English. She died unexpectedly at her home in Essex, aged 64, before completing the third book.

== Life and career ==
=== Early years ===
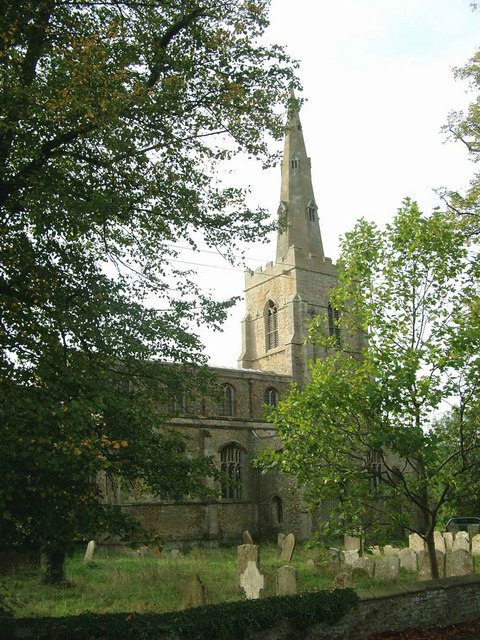
St Mary's Church in Bluntisham, Huntingdonshire, where Sayers's father was rector during her childhood

Sayers was born on 13 June 1893 at the Old Choir House in Brewer Street, Oxford; she was the only child of the Rev Henry Sayers and his wife Helen "Nell" Mary, née Leigh. Henry Sayers, born at Tittleshall, Norfolk, was the son of the Rev Robert Sayers, from County Tipperary, Ireland. At the time of Sayers's birth her father was headmaster of Christ Church Cathedral School and chaplain of Christ Church, one of the colleges of the University of Oxford. Her mother, born in Shirley, Hampshire, was a daughter of a solicitor descended from landed gentry on the Isle of Wight. Sayers was proud of the Leigh connection and later considered calling herself "D. Leigh Sayers" in professional matters, before settling for "Dorothy L. Sayers"—insisting on the inclusion of the middle initial.

When Sayers was four years old her father accepted the post of rector of Bluntisham-cum-Earith in the Fen Country of East Anglia. The appointment carried a better stipend than the Christ Church posts and the large rectory had considerably more room than the family's house in Oxford, but the move cut them off from the city's lively social scene. This affected the rector and his wife differently: he was scholarly and self-effacing; she, like many of the Leigh family—including her great-uncle Percival Leigh, a contributor to the humorous magazine Punch—was outgoing and gregarious and she missed the stimulation of Oxford society.

In the Oxford Dictionary of National Biography (ODNB), Catherine Kenney writes that the lack of siblings and neighbouring children of her own age or class made Sayers's childhood fairly solitary, although her parents were loving and attentive. Sayers formed one lasting friendship in these years: Ivy Shrimpton, eight years her senior, her first cousin as Nell's niece. Shrimpton, raised in California as an infant but educated in an Anglican convent school in Oxford, made extended visits to the Bluntisham rectory. Kenney writes that the two formed a lifelong friendship through "a youthful sharing of books, imagination, and confidences". Otherwise, Kenney comments, Sayers, "like many future authors ... lived largely a life of books and stories". She could read by the age of four, and made full use of her father's extensive library as she grew up.

=== Schooling ===
Sayers was educated chiefly at home. Her father began teaching her Latin before she was seven, and she had lessons from governesses in other subjects, including French and German. In January 1909, when she was fifteen, her parents sent her to Godolphin School, a boarding school in Salisbury. Her biographer Barbara Reynolds writes that Sayers took a lively part in the life of the school, acting in plays, some of which she wrote and produced herself, singing (sometimes solo), playing the violin and the viola in the school orchestra and forming highly charged friendships.

Despite some excellent teachers, Sayers was not happy at the school. Joining at the age of fifteen, rather than the school's normal starting age of eight, she was seen as an outsider by some of the other girls, and not all the staff approved of her independence of mind. As an Anglican with strong high-church views, she was repelled by the form of Christianity practised at Godolphin, described by her biographer James Brabazon as "a low-church pietism, drab and mealy-mouthed", which came close to putting her off religion completely.

During an outbreak of measles at the school in 1911 Sayers nearly died, and as a result went temporarily bald and took to wearing wigs. Her mother was allowed to stay at the school, where she nursed her daughter, who recovered in time to study and sit for a Gilchrist Scholarship, which she was awarded in March 1912. Among the purposes of these scholarships was to sponsor women to study at university colleges. Sayers's scholarship, worth £50 a year for three years, enabled her to study modern languages at Somerville College, Oxford. (Note: £50 in 1912 equates to approximately £1,480 in 2025, according to calculations based on the Consumer Price Index measure of inflation. In comparison, Sayers's father was on a stipend of £700 a year, an amount that led Reynolds to describe him as "far from wealthy".) After her experiences with the religious regime at Godolphin, Sayers chose Somerville, a non-denominational college, instead of an Anglican college.

=== Oxford ===
The all-women college of Somerville suited well, according to Kenney, because of its practice of cultivating its students to take prominent roles in the arts and public life. She enjoyed her time there, and, she later said, acquired a scholarly method and habit of mind which served her throughout her life. She was a distinguished student, and, in Kenney's view, Sayers's novels and essays reflect her liberal education at Oxford. Among the lifelong friends she made at Somerville was Muriel St Clare Byrne, who later played an important part in Sayers's career and became her literary executor.

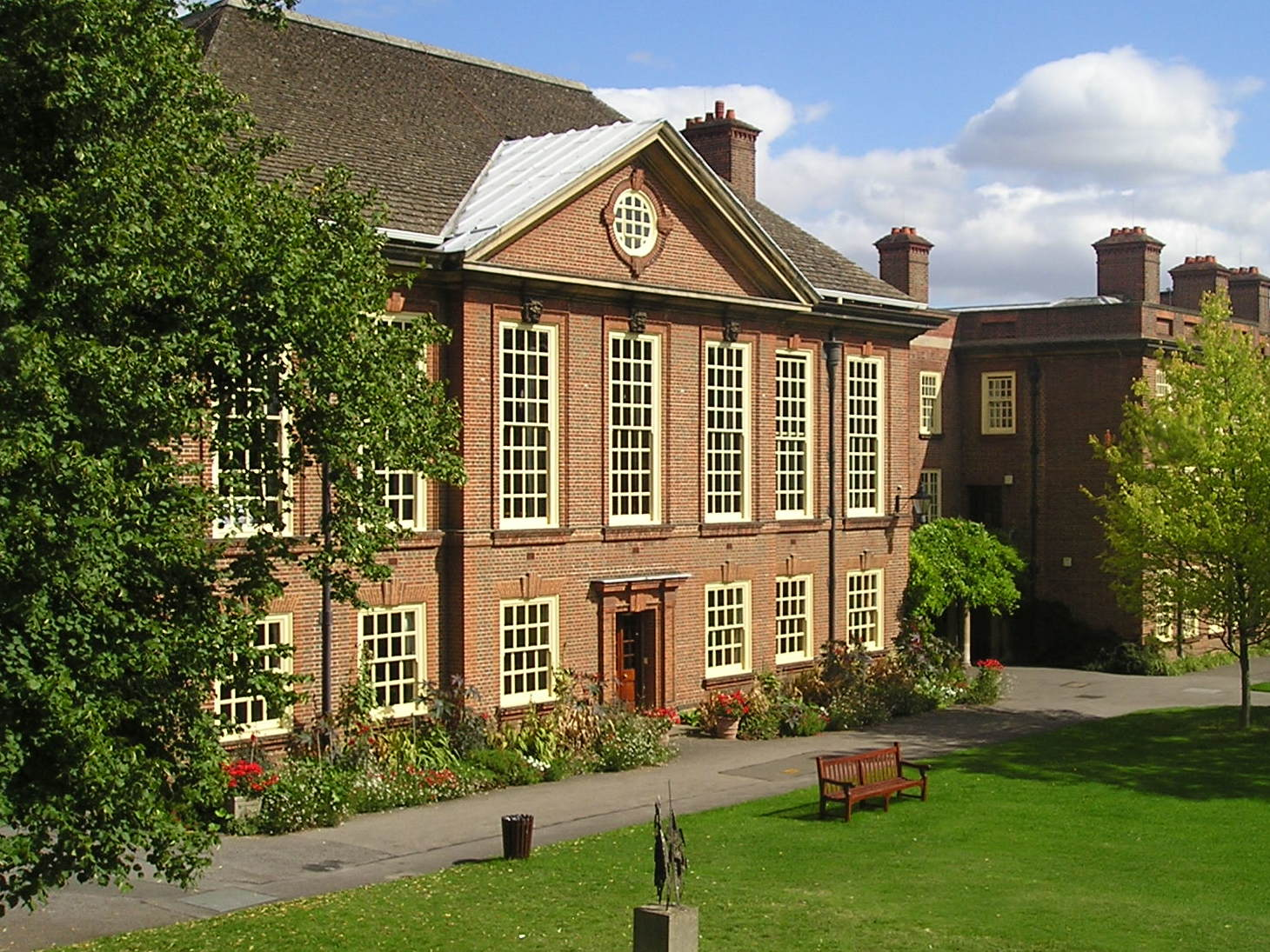
Somerville College

Sayers was co-founder, with Amphilis Middlemore and Charis Ursula Barnett, of the Mutual Admiration Society, a literary society where female students would read and critique each other's work. Sayers gave the group its name, remarking, "if we didn't give ourselves that title, the rest of College would". The society was a forerunner of the Inklings, the informal literary discussion group at Oxford; Sayers never belonged to the latter—an all-male group of writers—but became friendly with C. S. Lewis and other members.

Sayers, who was considered to have a good contralto voice, joined the Oxford Bach Choir and developed an unrequited passion for its director, Hugh Allen. Later in her time at Oxford, she became attracted to a fellow student named Roy Ridley, later chaplain of Balliol, on whose appearance and manner she later drew for her best-known character, Lord Peter Wimsey. She studied diligently, with the encouragement of her tutor, Mildred Pope, and in 1915 she was awarded first class honours in what was termed modern (in fact medieval) French in her final examinations. Despite her examination results, she was ineligible to be awarded a degree, as Oxford did not formally confer them on women. When the university changed its rules in 1920, Sayers was among the first to have her degree officially awarded.

=== Early employment and first novel, 1916–1924 ===
Sayers's second book of verse, 1918

After graduating from Oxford, Sayers, who had begun writing verse in childhood, brought out two slim volumes of poetry, Op. I (1916) and Catholic Tales and Christian Songs (1918). (Note: Sayers contributed verse to other publications, including two poems published in the short-lived gay magazine The Quorum (1920).) To earn a living she taught modern languages at Hull High School for Girls. Teaching did not greatly appeal to her, and in 1917 she secured a post with the publisher and bookseller Basil Blackwell in Oxford. Returning to the city suited her well. A younger contemporary, Doreen Wallace, later described her in these years:

I have never known anyone so brimful of the energy of a well-stocked mind: even at 24, when I knew her first, she knew an enormous amount about all sorts of subjects unconnected with Old French literature, which was her alleged "special," and nothing would content her but fact. There was, however, a lighter side to this impressive character. Long and slim in those days, small head held alert on slender neck, she loped round Oxford looking for fun.

The post with Blackwell lasted for two years, after which Sayers moved to France. She was engaged in 1919 by a school near Verneuil-sur-Avre in Normandy as assistant to Eric Whelpton, who was teaching English there. She had been in love with him at Oxford, and he was among the models for the appearance and character of Wimsey. In 1921 Sayers returned to London, accepted a teaching position with a girls' school in Acton, London, and began a relationship with a fellow writer, John Cournos. The affair was intense and lasted until October 1922 when Cournos left the country.

In 1922 Sayers took a job as a copywriter at S. H. Benson, then Britain's largest advertising agency. Although she had reservations about the misleading nature of advertising, (Note: In Murder Must Advertise, which draws on her experience at Benson's, Sayers writes, "Of course, there is some truth in advertising. There's yeast in bread, but you can't make bread with yeast alone. Truth in advertising ... provides a suitable quantity of gas, with which to blow out a mass of crude misrepresentation into a form that the public can swallow.") she became a skilled practitioner, and remained with the firm until the end of 1929. She originated successful campaigns for products including Guinness stout and Colman's mustard. She is sometimes credited with coining the slogan "My Goodness, My Guinness", but it dates from 1935, more than five years after she left Benson's. She was, though, responsible for the introduction of the Guinness toucan, painted by the artist John Gilroy, for which she penned accompanying verse such as "If he can say as you can/Guinness is good for you/How grand to be a Toucan/Just think what Toucan do". The toucan was used in Guinness's advertisements for decades. Kenney writes that at Benson's, Sayers again enjoyed "some of the fun and camaraderie she had experienced as a student at Oxford".

In her off-duty hours Sayers devoted herself to writing fiction. Detective novels were popular, and Sayers saw an opportunity to produce remunerative, accessible but well-written works in the genre. She mastered the mechanics of the craft by making a close analytical study of the best models. In a biographical sketch, a later crime novelist, J. I. M. Stewart, wrote:

There were already many ingenious writers, but most of them either wrote in a pedestrian style, with little concern for anything except a puzzle, or rashly incorporated out of traditional fiction elements over which they had no command. (Note: Sayers shared this view. She wrote in 1934, "... when I meet the least touch of real originality, or creepy-crawlery, or glamour, or humour, or sheer rollicking cut-and-thrust-and have-at-'em combativeness in a thriller I hail it with cries of joy. But 99 times out of 100 I find only bad English, cliché, balderdash, and boredom".) ... She mastered the art of giving a pleasant literary flavour to her stories while at the same time keeping within her own imaginative range.

The first of Sayers's series of detective novels, Whose Body?, featured her amateur detective Lord Peter Wimsey. She had begun writing it before joining Benson's, and it was published in 1923, to mixed reviews; one critic thought it a "somewhat complicated mystery ... clever but crude", and another found the aristocratic Wimsey unconvincing as a detective and the story "a poor specimen of sensationalism". Some other reviews were more favourable: "the solution does not, as is so often the case, come as an anti-climax to disappoint expectations and lead the reader to feel that he has been 'had' ... We hope to hear from the noble sleuth again"; "We had hardly thought a woman writer could be so robustly gruesome ... a very diverting problem"; "First-rate construction ... a thoroughly satisfactory yarn from start to finish".

Sayers's relationship with Cournos continued until 1922. It remained unconsummated because Cournos did not want children and Sayers refused, for religious reasons, to use contraception. After that affair ended she met a man, Bill White, by whom she had a son in 1924. The novelist A. N. Wilson describes White as "motorcycling rough trade". That liaison was short-lived—White turned out to be married—and the son, whom Sayers named John Anthony, was brought up by Ivy Shrimpton, who already had foster children in her care. Sayers concealed her son's parentage from him and from the world in general. She was known to him at first as "Cousin Dorothy", and she later posed as his adoptive mother. Only after her death were the facts made explicit.

=== Early novels, 1925–1929 ===
Whose Body?, published in both Britain and the US, sold well enough for the London publishers, Fisher Unwin, to ask for a sequel. Before that was published Sayers featured Wimsey in a short story, "The Fascinating Problem of Uncle Meleager's Will", published in Pearson's Magazine in July 1925, which, together with other short stories centred on Wimsey, came out in book form in Lord Peter Views the Body in 1928.

Clouds of Witness, the second Wimsey novel, was published in 1926, and was well received. The Daily News commented:

Not for a long time has there appeared a detective story so amusing, so lively, so witty and so agreeable. ... All Miss Sayers's characterisation is bright, natural and amusing; not a character in the book hangs fire, and there is a delightful absence of conventional clichés throughout ... It is to be hoped that Miss Sayers will not let anything check the flow of her detective-story habit.

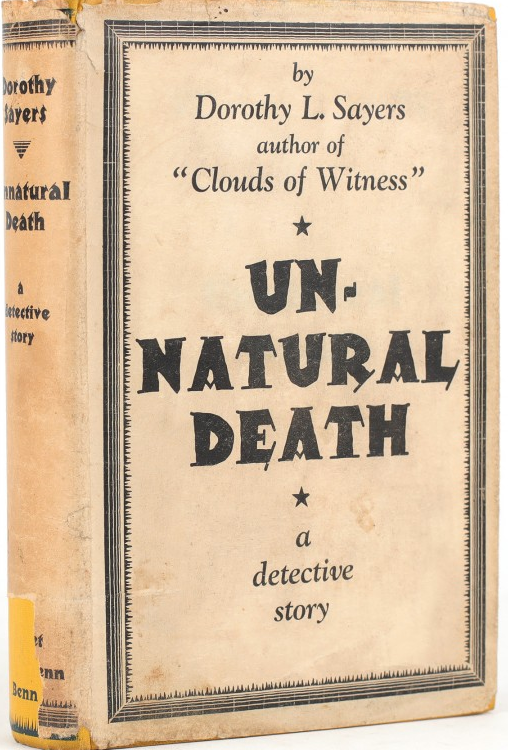
The third Wimsey novel, published in 1927

Other reviewers wrote of a "well-written and pulsating mystery story, with an astonishing number of clues cleverly evolved, and totally unexpected conclusion", and a "pleasantly-going and smartly-written detective story"; another commented, "Miss Sayers is frankly out to thrill us; but her novel is something far other than a typical shocker. Her characters (especially her hero) are very much alive, and she has an admirable narrative style and great constructive skill". With this second novel, Sayers was being compared with the established crime novelist Agatha Christie as an author of detective stories that were also entertaining novels about human beings.

In the same year Sayers married a divorcé, Captain Oswald Arthur (known as "Mac") Fleming, a well-known journalist. Her son was given the latter's surname but was not brought to live with Sayers and her husband. The marriage, happy at first, grew more difficult as Fleming's health declined, but the couple stayed together until his death of a stroke in 1950, when he was 68. (Note: Fleming had been gassed and wounded in the war and had suffered shell shock. He was in a military hospital in January 1919 and discharged himself; Brabazon notes he did so "little knowing what the long-term effects of his physical and psychological injuries were going to be". In later life Fleming suffered badly with depression, rheumatism, the effects of heavy drinking and heart problems.)

The Wimsey novels continued with Unnatural Death in 1927 (Note: Published in the US under the title The Dawson Pedigree.) and The Unpleasantness at the Bellona Club in 1928. In that year Sayers published Lord Peter Views the Body and edited and introduced an anthology of other writers' works, Great Short Stories of Detection, Mystery and Horror, retitled for its American edition the following year as The Omnibus of Crime.

In 1929, her last year as an employee of Benson's, Sayers and her husband moved from London to the small Essex town of Witham, which remained their home for the rest of their lives. In that year she published Tristan in Brittany, a verse-and-prose translation of the 12th-century poetic fragments of The Romance of Tristan by Thomas of Britain. The scholar George Saintsbury wrote an introduction to the book, and Sayers was praised for making a historically important poem available for the first time in modern English.

=== 1930–1934 ===
In 1930 Sayers became a founder member of the Detection Club. This grew from informal dinners arranged by Anthony Berkeley for writers of detective fiction "for the enjoyment of each other's company and for a little shop talk". The dinners proved such a success that the participants agreed to form themselves into a club, under the presidency of G. K. Chesterton, whom Sayers admired. (Note: Sayers told Chesterton's widow, "I think, in some ways, G.K.'s books have become more a part of my mental make-up than those of any writer you could name".) She was one of the club's most enthusiastic members; she devised its elaborate initiation ritual in which new members swore to write without relying on "Divine Revelation, Feminine Intuition, Mumbo Jumbo, Jiggery Pokery, Coincidence or the Act of God" and "to observe a seemly moderation in the use of Gangs, Conspiracies, Death-Rays, Ghosts, Hypnotism, Trap-Doors, Chinamen, Super-Criminals and Lunatics, and utterly and forever to forswear Mysterious Poisons unknown to Science". (Note: The reference to "Chinamen" was probably a reference to Fu Manchu, the villain of Sax Rohmer's stories.) The club charged no subscription fees, and to raise money for the acquisition of premises members contributed to collaborative works for broadcast or print. The first, organised by Sayers, was Behind the Screen (1930) in which six club members took it in turn to read their own fifteen-minute episodes of a crime mystery on BBC radio. (Note: Sayers's episode was the third, following Hugh Walpole and Agatha Christie and preceding Anthony Berkeley, E. C. Bentley and Ronald Knox.)

Sayers published two novels in 1930. Prompted by a suggestion from a fellow author, Robert Eustace, she worked on The Documents in the Case. Eustace, a medical practitioner, provided the main plot device and scientific details; Sayers turned them into prose, hoping to write a novel in the manner of the 19th-century author Wilkie Collins, whose work she admired. She was working on a biography of Collins and adopted his first-person narrative technique in a story mostly told in exchanges of letters between the characters. Peter Wimsey does not appear in the book: Brabazon writes that Sayers "tasted the joys of freedom from Wimsey". Reviews were favourable, but gave only qualified praise. In The Graphic, the writer Evelyn Waugh contrasted Sayers and Christie:

Mrs Christie, on the whole, concentrates her ingenuity on a kind of three card trick, "spot the villain", and even exercises a kind of mesmeric influence on the reader in diverting his attention from the significant details. Miss Sayers, on the other hand, devotes herself more to devising unexpected mechanisms of crime and in creating characters who are of real personal interest quite apart from the importance they attain through the events of the story.

Second of Sayers's two 1930 novels

Sayers was disappointed with the book, and reproached herself for failing to do better with the material provided by her co-author. Her second book of the year was Strong Poison, in which she introduced the character Harriet Vane, whom Wimsey proves innocent of a murder charge. Sayers originally intended that at the end of the book Wimsey would marry Harriet and retire from detection, ending the series. Financial necessity, however, led the author to write another five Wimsey novels to provide her with a good income before they were eventually betrothed. Brabazon describes Harriet as Sayers's alter ego, sharing many attributes—favourable and otherwise—with the author. Harriet is described by Wimsey's mother as "so interesting and a really remarkable face, though perhaps not strictly good-looking, and all the more interesting for that". The writer Mary Ellen Chase thought that Sayers had never been conventionally beautiful and after attending one of her lectures in the 1930s, she wrote "There can be few plainer women on earth than Dorothy Sayers [but] I have never come across one so magnetic to listen to".

In 1931 Sayers collaborated with Detection Club colleagues on a longer serial for the BBC, The Scoop, and on a book, The Floating Admiral. She edited a second collection of Great Short Stories of Detection, Mystery and Horror, and as a solo effort wrote The Five Red Herrings, published in the US as Suspicious Characters. Harriet Vane does not appear in that novel, but is the central character in the next Wimsey book, Have His Carcase, published in 1932. Wimsey solves the murder but is no more successful in winning Harriet's love than he had been in Strong Poison. Have His Carcase was well received. The Scotsman called it a book to "keep a jaded reviewer out of bed in the small hours"; The Times said that the final twist "is really startling and ingenious, and though the reader is given a perfectly fair chance of guessing it none but the most ingenious can hope to do so"; and the reviewer in The Liverpool Echo called Sayers "the greatest of all detective story writers", though worried that her plots were so clever that some readers might struggle to keep up with them.

Murder Must Advertise, 1933

Over the following two years Sayers published two Wimsey novels (neither featuring Harriet Vane)—Murder Must Advertise (1933) and The Nine Tailors (1934)—and a collection of short stories, Hangman's Holiday, featuring not only the patrician Wimsey but also a proletarian salesman and solver of mysteries, Montague Egg. She edited a third and final volume of Great Short Stories of Detection, Mystery and Horror and began reviewing crime novels for The Sunday Times. Her reviews covered works by most of her important contemporaries, including her fellow "Queens of Crime" of the Golden Age of Detective Fiction—Christie and Margery Allingham. Kenney comments that much of Sayers's thinking on the mystery novel and literature generally can be gleaned from her reviews, which reveal much about her attitude to art. She expected authors to write excellent prose and to avoid situations and plot devices already used by other writers.

Sayers did not enjoy writing Murder Must Advertise and thought it an artistic failure:

I undertook (not very successfully) to present a contrast of two "cardboard" worlds, equally fictitious—the world of advertising and the world of the post-war "Bright Young People". (It was not very successful, because I knew and cared much more about advertising than about Bright Youth, but that is by the way.)

Kenney describes the book as "flawed but brilliant". In terms of its literary status in relation to more manifestly serious fiction of Sayers's day, Kenney ranks it below the final three Wimsey novels, The Nine Tailors, Gaudy Night and Busman's Honeymoon.

Like Murder Must Advertise, The Nine Tailors draws on the author's personal experiences. Her portrait of the Rev Theodore Venables "tenderly evoked" her father, "unworldly, self-effacing [and] lovable", as Reynolds puts it. The rectory in which Wimsey and his manservant, Bunter, are offered refuge after a car crash, resembles that in which Sayers grew up. With much of the storyline featuring bell-ringing, she spent considerable time researching campanology which gave her considerable trouble, and there were technical errors in her description of the practice. The book gained enthusiastic notices. In The News Chronicle, Charles Williams wrote that it was "not merely admirable; it is adorable. ... It is a great book". The Daily Herald said, "This is unquestionably Miss Sayers's best—until the next one".

=== Last novels and early religious works, 1935–1939 ===
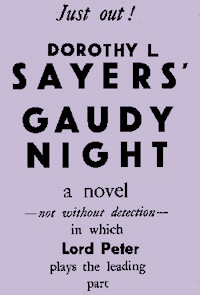
Penultimate Wimsey novel, 1935

In 1935 Sayers published what she intended to be the last Wimsey novel, Gaudy Night, set in Harriet Vane's old Oxford college. There is attempted murder but Wimsey identifies the culprit in time to prevent further harm. At the end of the book Wimsey proposes to Harriet (in Latin) and is accepted (also in Latin). In Oxford in May, and in London in June, Sayers delivered a lecture entitled "Aristotle on Detective Fiction", humorously contending that in his Poetics, Aristotle shows that what he most wished for was a good detective story. The same year Sayers worked on a script for a film to be called The Silent Passenger. Although she was promised editorial control, it was not forthcoming and the script was altered; according to her biographer David Coomes, the Wimsey character "looked like a member of the Mafia".

Sayers was growing tired of the solitary vocation of a novelist, and was glad to collaborate with her old university friend Byrne on a new Wimsey story written for the theatre. Busman's Honeymoon, "a detective comedy in three acts", had a short provincial tour before opening in the West End. Sayers, who kept in close contact with her son, John, sent him an account of the demanding rehearsals for the opening, a milieu new to her. The London premiere was at the Comedy Theatre in December 1936. Dennis Arundell and Veronica Turleigh played Wimsey and Harriet. It ran for more than a year, and while it was still running, Sayers rewrote it as a novel, published in 1937, the last of her full-length books featuring Wimsey.

While the play was in rehearsal the organisers of the Canterbury Festival invited Sayers to write a drama for performance in Canterbury Cathedral, following the 1935 staging there of T. S. Eliot's Murder in the Cathedral, and other plays. The result, The Zeal of Thy House, was her dramatisation in blank verse of the life and work of William of Sens, one of the architects of the cathedral. It opened in June 1937, was well reviewed, and made a profit for the festival.

The following year Sayers returned to a religious theme with He That Should Come, a radio Nativity play, broadcast by the BBC on Christmas Day, and in 1939 the Canterbury Festival staged another of her plays, The Devil to Pay. In the same year she published a collection of short stories, In the Teeth of the Evidence—featuring Wimsey, Egg and others—and began a series of articles for The Spectator called The Wimsey Papers between 17 November 1939 and 26 January 1940, using Wimsey and his family and friends to convey Sayers's thoughts on life and politics in the early weeks of the Second World War.

=== Dante and The Man Born to Be King, 1940s ===
For the theatre Sayers wrote a comedy, Love All, a wry take on the eternal triangle. It opened in a London fringe theatre in April 1940. Notices were friendly—The Times said that Sayers poked some agreeable fun at a number of conventions, sentimental, literary, and theatrical and The Stage called the play "very amusing and provocative"—but at that stage of the war there was no demand for another light comedy in the West End, and there was no transfer.

The task that preoccupied Sayers from the 1940s to the end of her life was her translation of Dante Alighieri's Divine Comedy. She said she began it after reading the original Italian version in an air-raid shelter during bombing raids. (Note: Brabazon questions the notion that Sayers spent much time taking refuge in air-raid shelters.) She saw parallels between the writing and the state of the world during the war.

I saw the whole lay-out of Hell as something actual and contemporary; something that one can see by looking into one's self, or into the pages of tomorrow's newspaper. I saw it, that is, as a judgment of fact, unaffected by its period, unaffected by its literary or dogmatic origins and I recognised at the same moment that the judgment was true.

She thought Dante was "simply the most incomparable story-teller who ever set pen to paper", and in addition to the parallels of the world during war, she believed that her society suffered from a lack of faith, declining morality, dishonesty, exploitation, disharmony and other similar problems, and believed that Dante shared the same view of his own. Once she began to read, she found herself unable to stop:

I bolted my meals, neglected my sleep, work and correspondence, drove my friends crazy, and paid only a distracted attention to the doodle-bugs which happened to be infesting the neighbourhood at the time, until I had panted my way through the Three Realms of the Dead from top to bottom and from bottom to top.

As well as her work on Dante, Sayers continued to write drama. At the BBC's request she created a cycle of twelve radio plays portraying the life of Jesus, The Man Born to Be King (1941–42), which, Kenney observes, were broadcast to "a huge audience of Britons during the darkest days of the Second World War". Sayers insisted from the outset on realism, modern speech and a portrayal of Jesus. He had appeared as a character in numerous Passion plays in earlier centuries, but this was the first time an actor had played the part on radio; the press referred to "a radio Oberammergau". Some conservative Christians expressed outrage. The Lord's Day Observance Society called it a "revolting imitation of the voice of our Divine Saviour and Redeemer" and declared, "to impersonate the Divine Son of God in this way is an act of irreverence bordering on the blasphemous". The actor Robert Speaight, who played Jesus, said the plays were successful because "we did not approach the parts in a reverential frame of mind. We approached them exactly as if it was any other kind of play". As the series progressed, the controversy died down. The BBC's religious advisory committee, representing all the major Christian denominations, was united in support of the cycle, which came to be regarded as one of Sayers's greatest achievements.

Sayers's other main work from the wartime years was her extended essay The Mind of the Maker, arguing that human creativity is the attribute that gives mankind its best chance of understanding, however imperfectly, the nature of God's mind. Between 1944 and 1949 she published two volumes of essays and a collection of stories for children, and wrote another religious play, The Just Vengeance, commissioned for the 750th anniversary celebrations of Lichfield Cathedral, which, she later said, was "very stale and abstract" and pleased theologians more than it pleased the actors.

In 1949 Penguin Books published The Divine Comedy, Cantica I, Hell in Sayers's translation. Reviews were excellent. One critic wrote, "Her translation ... is not only scholarly but is being hailed as the best English translation of that poem". In The Observer, Sir Ronald Storrs praised the "illuminating" translation and Sayers's "compendious notes", and said that future readers would be "profoundly in her debt". The Chicago Tribune criticised some of the archaisms in Sayers's version, but concluded "but all in all it looks to me like the translation to read ... you can't read very far into it and still think Dante is dull".

=== Last years, 1950–1957 ===
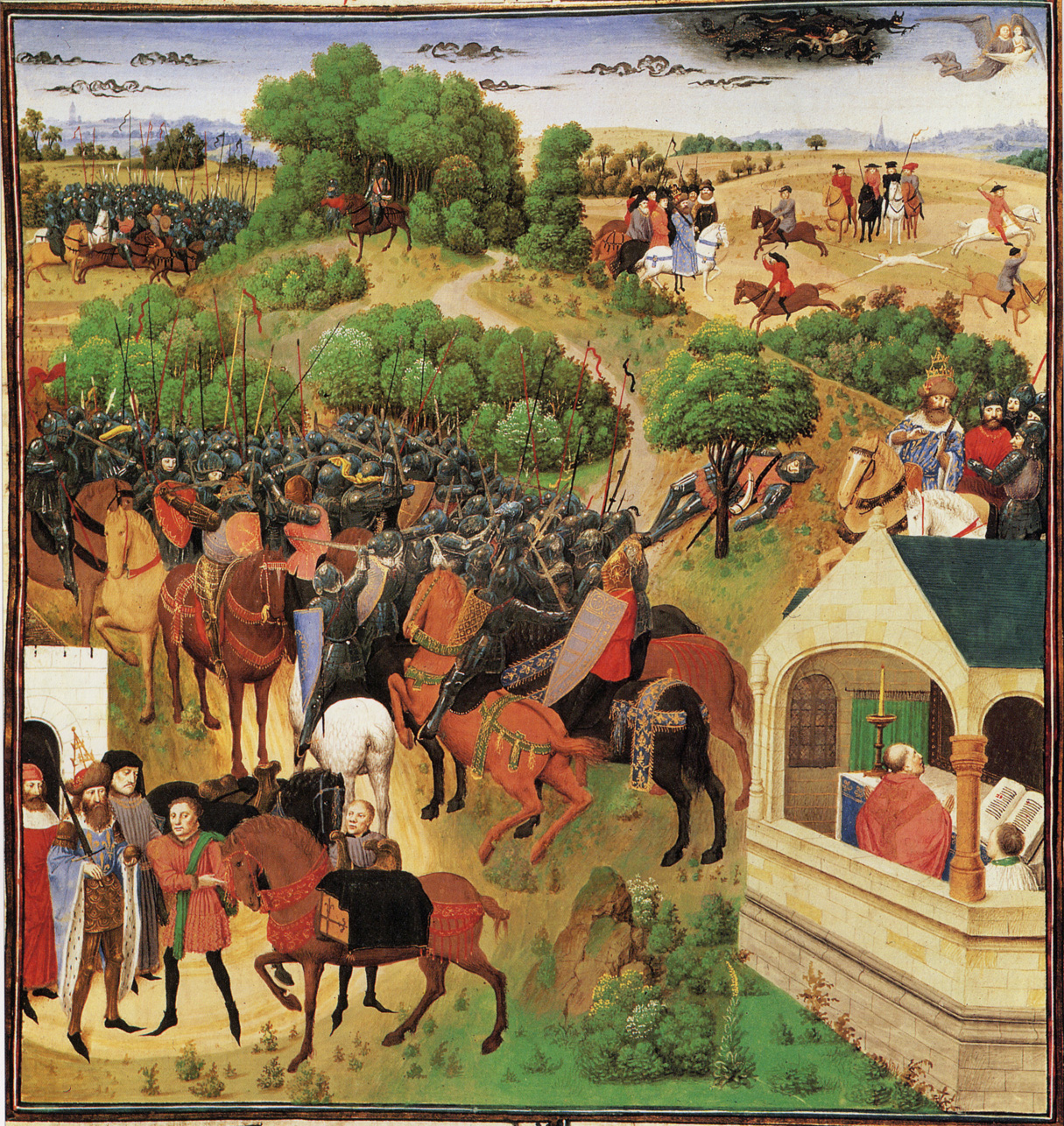
The Song of Roland, Sayers's last translation (1957)

In 1950 Sayers was awarded an honorary Doctorate of Letters by the University of Durham. (Note: Seven years earlier Sayers declined a Lambeth doctorate of divinity because she was not "a more convincing type of Christian" and was reluctant to wear "any sort of ecclesiastical label".) After years of declining health her husband Mac died at their home in Witham in June 1950. The following year, for the Festival of Britain, she wrote her last play, The Emperor Constantine, described by The Stage as "long, rambling, episodic, and wholly absorbing".

Sayers made a last foray into crime fiction in 1953 with No Flowers By Request, another collaborative serial, published in The Daily Sketch, co-written with E. C. R. Lorac, Anthony Gilbert, Gladys Mitchell and Christianna Brand. The following year she published Introductory Papers on Dante, and in 1955 Penguin Books published Purgatory, the second volume of her translation of The Divine Comedy. Like its predecessor, it enjoyed substantial sales. The last books by Sayers were The Song of Roland, translated from the French, and a second volume of papers on Dante (both 1957).

On 17 December 1957 Sayers died suddenly of a coronary thrombosis at her home in Witham, aged 64; she was cremated six days later at Golders Green Crematorium. Her ashes were buried at the base of the tower of St Anne's Church, Soho. Her translation of the third and final volume of The Divine Comedy, two-thirds complete, was finished by Barbara Reynolds.

== Works ==
=== Detective stories ===
According to the literary critic Bernard Benstock, Sayers's reputation as a novelist is based on her works featuring Peter Wimsey, the aristocratic amateur detective who appears in eleven of her twelve novels and four collections of short stories. Benstock considers the novels to be "of consistently high literary quality" displaying "witty repartee and erudite epigrams", while Bruce Merry, an analyst of detective fiction, thinks them "intellectually ... resourceful and highly refined", even though they have not aged well.

Suggested literary antecedents of Wimsey and Bunter

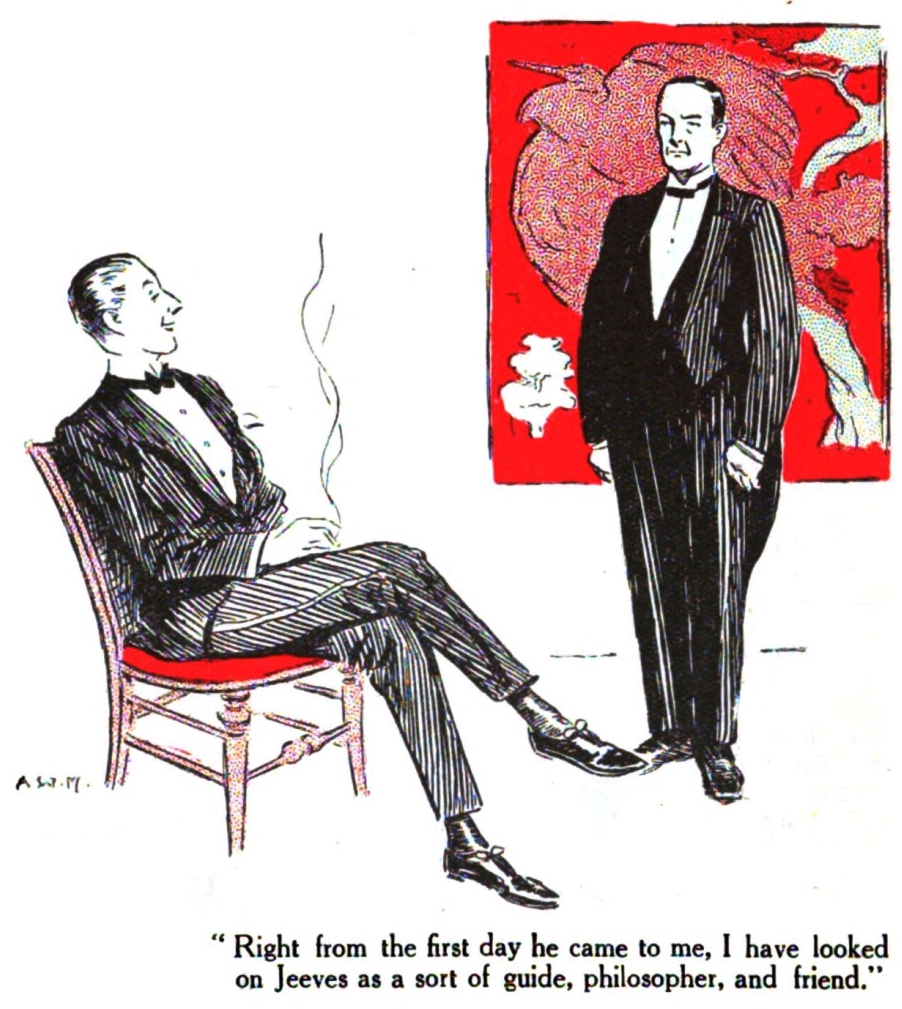
Bertie Wooster and Jeeves

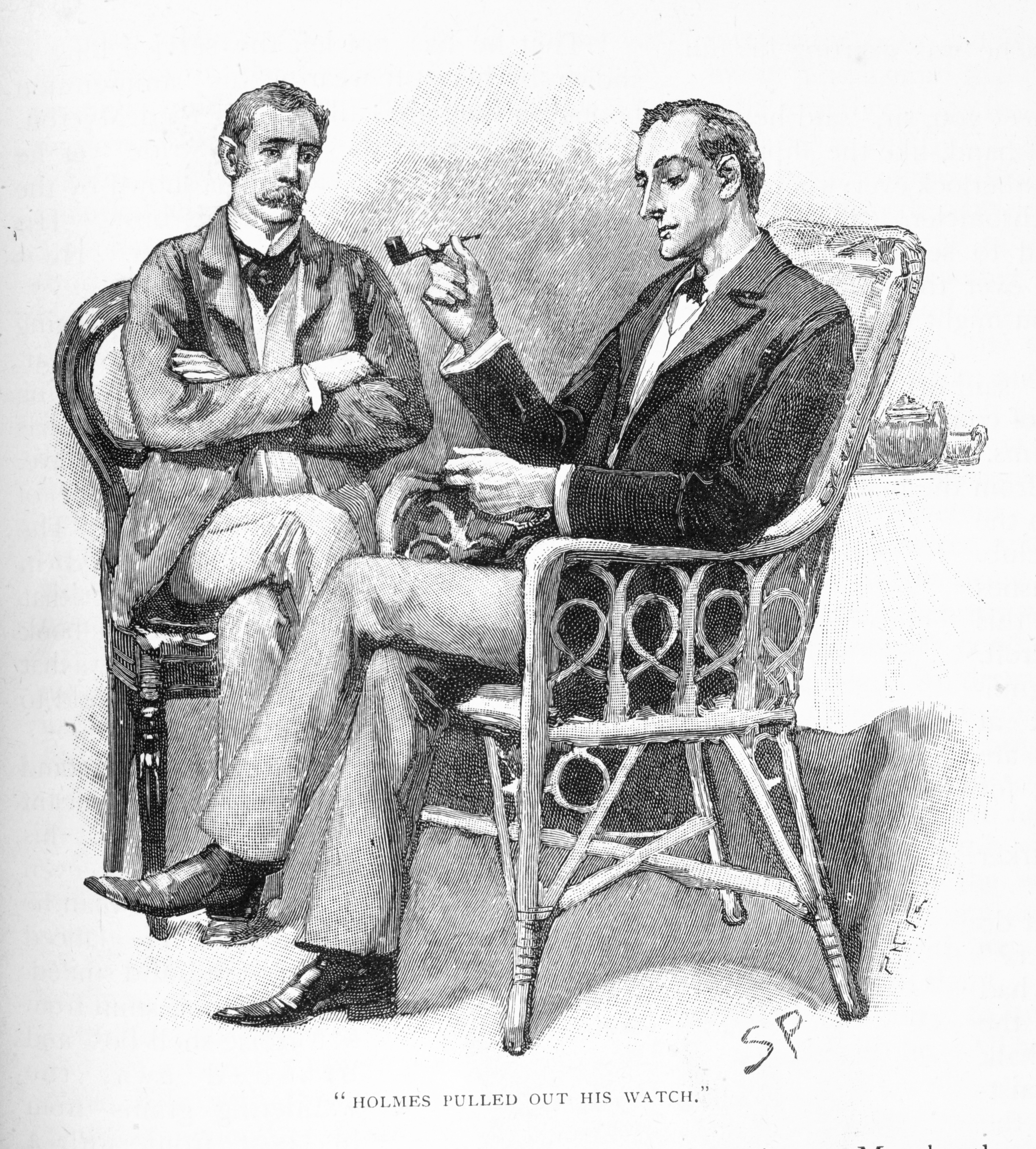
Dr Watson and Sherlock Holmes

The crime writer Julian Symons observes that the growth of the Golden Age writing in Britain during the inter-war years came "not by adherence to the rules but through a measure of revolt against them" by Sayers, Anthony Berkeley and Agatha Christie. For Sayers, her revolt lay partly in character development and the introduction of a love interest for Wimsey, allowing emotions to become apparent in the story: Wimsey falls in love with Harriet Vane in Strong Poison, romances her in Gaudy Night and marries her in Busman's Honeymoon. The last of these was sub-titled "A love story with detective interruptions", and was described in The Times Literary Supplement as "a love story and a detective story, and so much more besides".

The revolt against the rules was shown in the development of the Wimsey character. Several critics have considered that on Wimsey's first appearance—in Whose Body?—he is not a fully rounded character. (Note: Wimsey is variously described as "a caricature", a "Wooster-like, monocled, man-about-Town", an "underdeveloped character", "one-dimensional" and a character "in the so-called Silly Ass tradition shaped by P. G. Wodehouse’s facetious stories".) By the final Wimsey novel—Busman's Honeymoon—he has undergone a change to become a sensitive scholar, feeling guilt over condemning a murderer to hanging ("a poor devil who hasn’t got a bean in the world and hasn’t done us any harm"), while he struggles with the shell shock he suffered from the war. The change is one that the writer P. D. James describes as "less a development than a metamorphosis". Sayers's portrayal of Wimsey's mental crises as a result of shell shock and aspects of the war run throughout the Wimsey series. (Note: Works in which the war is used as a plot point, or in which Wimsey demonstrates his shell shock are Whose Body? (1923), The Unpleasantness at the Bellona Club (1928), The Nine Tailors (1934), Gaudy Night (1936) and Busman's Honeymoon (1937).)

Sayers's use of a monied aristocrat has been criticised. In 1963, in an article in The Listener, the cultural critic Martin Green described Sayers as "one of the world's masters of the pornography of class-distinction", while he outlined Wimsey's treatment of his social inferiors. The writer Colin Watson in his study of interwar thrillers, Snobbery with Violence, also saw in Wimsey the habit of mocking those from different social classes; for Sayers's descriptions of the wealthy and titled, he described her a "sycophantic bluestocking". Eric Sandberg, in his examination of the Wimsey novels, dissents from this view, and considers "it would not be accurate to describe Sayers's depiction of the aristocracy as adulatory or sycophantic" as, with the exception of Wimsey and his mother, other members of the upper classes are written as being dim or archaic. Peter Latham, in his examination of snobbery in modern novels Am I a Snob?, also sees Sayers's treatment of the upper classes as satire. He considers that she "revels in the comedy of snobbery and the absurdity of pretension, making even her detective a ridiculously affected stereotype".

A 2021 study by the historian Laura Mayhall draws parallels between Wimsey and his valet Bunter and the P. G. Wodehouse characters Bertie Wooster and Jeeves, particularly around the choice of clothing—determined by the valet, rather than his employer; Mayhall concludes there is parody in such interactions, showing Sayers mocking stereotypes, rather than portraying reality. The literature academic Valerie Pitt highlights an interchange between Bunter and Wimsey from The Unpleasantness at the Bellona Club which she considers parody: "Bunter produced an innocent looking monocle which was, in reality, a powerful magnifier. 'And the finger-print powder is in your lordship's right-hand coat pocket'". Pitt sees comparisons between the Wimsey novels and the Sherlock Holmes novels of Arthur Conan Doyle, together with the influence of Wodehouse on the character. Bunter she sees as fulfilling the role of both Jeeves and Dr Watson, while there are also parallels between the roles of Sayers's Chief Inspector Charles Parker and Conan Doyle's Inspector Lestrade, just as there is with Wimsey's unofficial assistance from Miss Climpson and Holmes's Baker Street Irregulars. Physically there is a resemblance between Wimsey and Wooster; one of the characters in Murder Must Advertise describes him as "tow-coloured, supercilious-looking blighter. ... Cross between Ralph Lynn and Bertie Wooster."

=== Christian writing ===
Sayers wrote on religious themes from early in her life. Her second volume of verse, Catholic Tales and Christian Songs (1918), included a short satirical verse play, "The Mocking of Christ", but it was not until the late 1930s that she turned away from detective fiction to concentrate on religious subjects. Within about a decade her reputation was based as much on her writing as a "lay Christian apologist" as on her novels.

The Zeal of Thy House, the play she wrote for the Canterbury Festival in 1937, went on tour nationally, played a limited West End season, and was well reviewed. A London critic wrote, "Not only is this play sincere and impressive ... it is good entertainment ... an essentially serious treatment of theological questions ... which with rare skill Miss Sayers has made at the same time dramatic". According to the literary academic Crystal Downing, the staging of The Zeal of Thy House "radically changed Sayers's life". The success of the play led the festival to commission another, produced two years later. This was a version of the Faust legend, called The Devil to Pay. Between these two stage works Sayers wrote a Nativity play for the BBC and two articles on theology for The Sunday Times.

From 1940 Sayers published volumes containing studies, lectures, and essays on theological topics. According to the historian Lucy Wooding the plays and the books combine a high degree of professional competence with "fresh and penetrating insights into the meaning of the Christian faith in the modern world". Wooding writes that Sayers was loosely associated with several other representatives of "what might be called lay orthodoxy", including C. S. Lewis, Charles Williams, and T. S. Eliot, writing before and after the Second World War.

Sayers insisted in an article titled "Playwrights are Not Evangelists" that her purpose was not to proselytise. Her view of theological aesthetics was that a work of art will speak to its audience only if the artist serves the work rather than trying to preach. She said that her motive in writing The Man Born to Be King was not "to do good", but to tell the story to the best of her ability ... "in short, to make as good a work of art as I could".

In a 2017 study for the Ecclesiastical History Society, Margaret Wiedemann Hunt writes that The Man Born to Be King was "an astonishing and far-reaching innovation", not only because it used colloquial speech and because Jesus was portrayed by an actor (something not then permitted in theatres in Britain), but also because "it brought the gospels into people's lives in a way that demanded an imaginative response". In preparation for writing the cycle, Sayers made her own translations of the Gospels from the original Greek into modern English; she hoped to persuade listeners that the 17th-century King James version was over-familiar to churchgoers and incomprehensible to everyone else. In a 1984 study of religious broadcasting in Britain, Kenneth Wolfe writes of The Man Born to Be King, "That it was the most astonishing and far-reaching innovation in all religious broadcasting so far is beyond dispute".

=== Dante ===
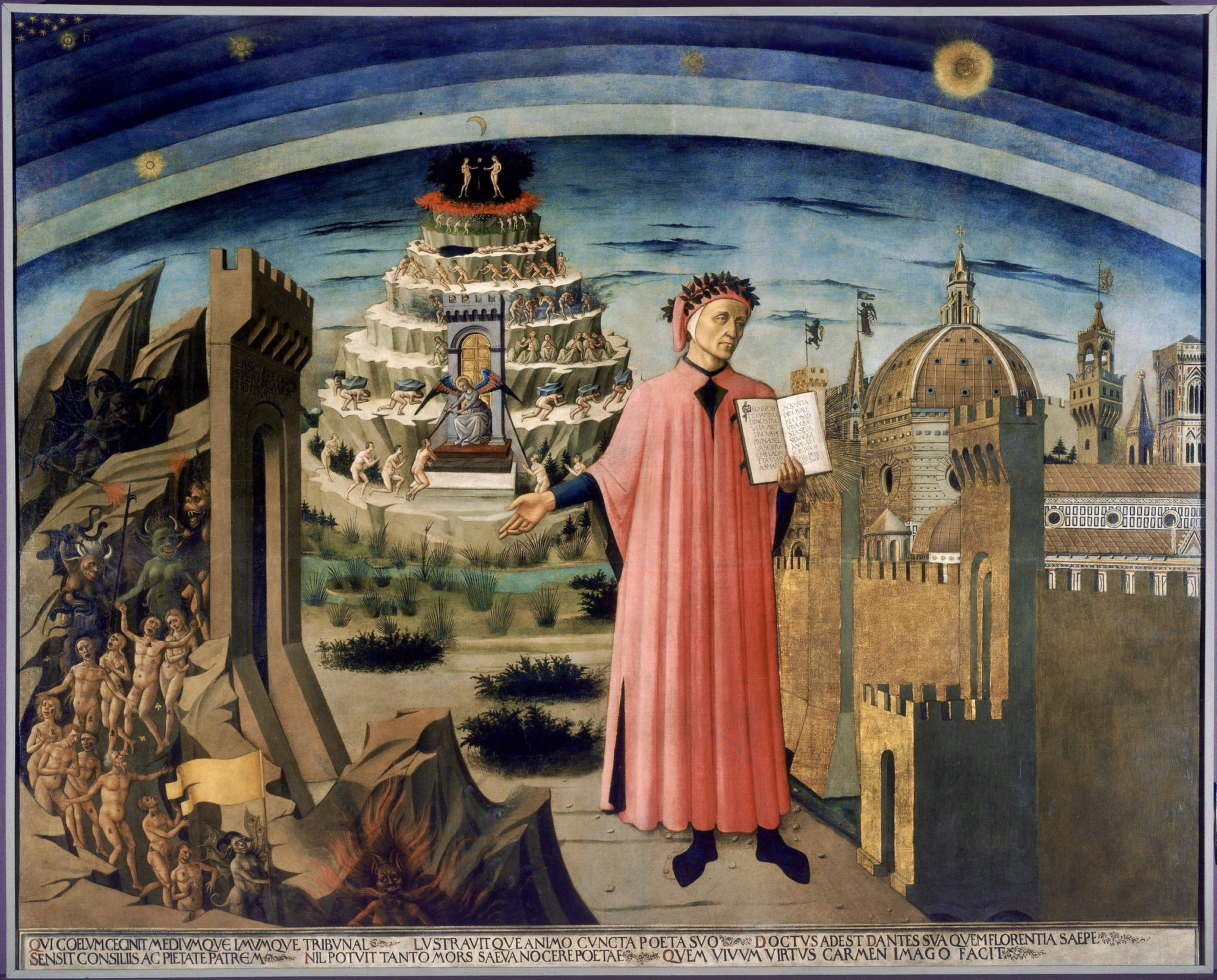
Dante in Domenico di Michelino's 1465 fresco, shown holding a copy of the Divine Comedy; to his right is the entrance to Hell and the seven terraces of Mount Purgatory; to his left is Florence, with the spheres of Heaven above

Sayers's 1949 translation of Dante's Hell was a best-seller: its first print run of 50,000 quickly sold out. Cantica 2 of The Divine Comedy, Purgatory, was published in 1955, but when Sayers died her version of the final Cantica, Heaven, was only two-thirds complete. Reynolds finished the translation and it was published in 1962. The three volumes of the Sayers translation sold 1.25 million copies by 1999. Writing in 1989 Reynolds noted that because of Sayers's translations, Dante has been read by "more English-speaking readers in the last forty years than he had in the preceding six and a quarter centuries".

For her translation Sayers chose to use modern colloquial English, and as she described, "to eschew 'Marry, quotha!' without declining upon 'Sez you!'". Where she differed from this was in Purgatory, where Dante used the dialect of Provence for the words of the southern French poet Arnaut Daniel: Sayers instead used a Southern Scots dialect and explained it was "a dialect which bears something of the same relation to English as Provençal does to Italian". Sayers's biographer Mary Brian Durkin observes that "many find her translation of the passage jarring and distracting", while Durkin thinks it "forced ... almost doggerel".

Sayers retained Dante's terza rima structure—three-line stanzas linked by their rhyme scheme—a difficult form to use in English translations, given the fewer rhyme endings when compared with Italian. The theological academic Mary Prentice Barrows considers that when the form is used in English translations of Dante, including those by Sayers, "the necessity of fitting the exact sense into triple rhymes inevitably forces distorted syntax and strange choices of words, so that the limpidity—the characteristic beauty of the original—is lost". Thomas G. Bergin, a scholar of Italian literature who had also translated The Divine Comedy, thought that Sayers's translation has "the directness of Dante in tone, and the very technique of Dante in execution. And indeed the merits of Miss Sayers's version are great." Although, he noted, the limitations of the form meant some of Sayers's rhymes were forced. The critic Dudley Fitts criticised Sayers's use of terza rima in English, and her use of some archaisms for the sake of rhyme which "are so nearly pervasive that they reduce the impact of a work generously conceived and lovingly elaborated". In the introduction to Purgatory, Sayers advised readers to

forget about the distinction between "prose" and "poetry", and to approach the Comedy as though it were a serious and intelligent novel. ... For in the fourteenth century, the allegorical poem was precisely what the novel is to-day—the dominant literary form, into which a writer could pour, without incongruity, everything that he had to say about life and the universe.

Reynolds considers Sayers was well placed to deal with Dante's rhyming structure. She had been interested in translating poetry from her schooldays and had enjoyed writing her own early verses. Her first works of poetry, according to Reynolds, contain "a masterly and beautiful example of a lay, a series of poems linked to a complex structure". Fitts considers her "not ... an accomplished poet; but she does handle verse intelligently". With each of the Dante translations, Sayers included detailed introductions to explain her word choices and to provide alternative translations. Notes were included on each canto to explain the allegories and symbology; the writer Anne Perry considers these "acutely satisfying and thought provoking and infinitely enriching the work". Sayers also provided an outline on Dante's life and personality, "without which", in Perry's view, "the whole work would be robbed of much of its meaning".

== Views ==
=== Racism ===
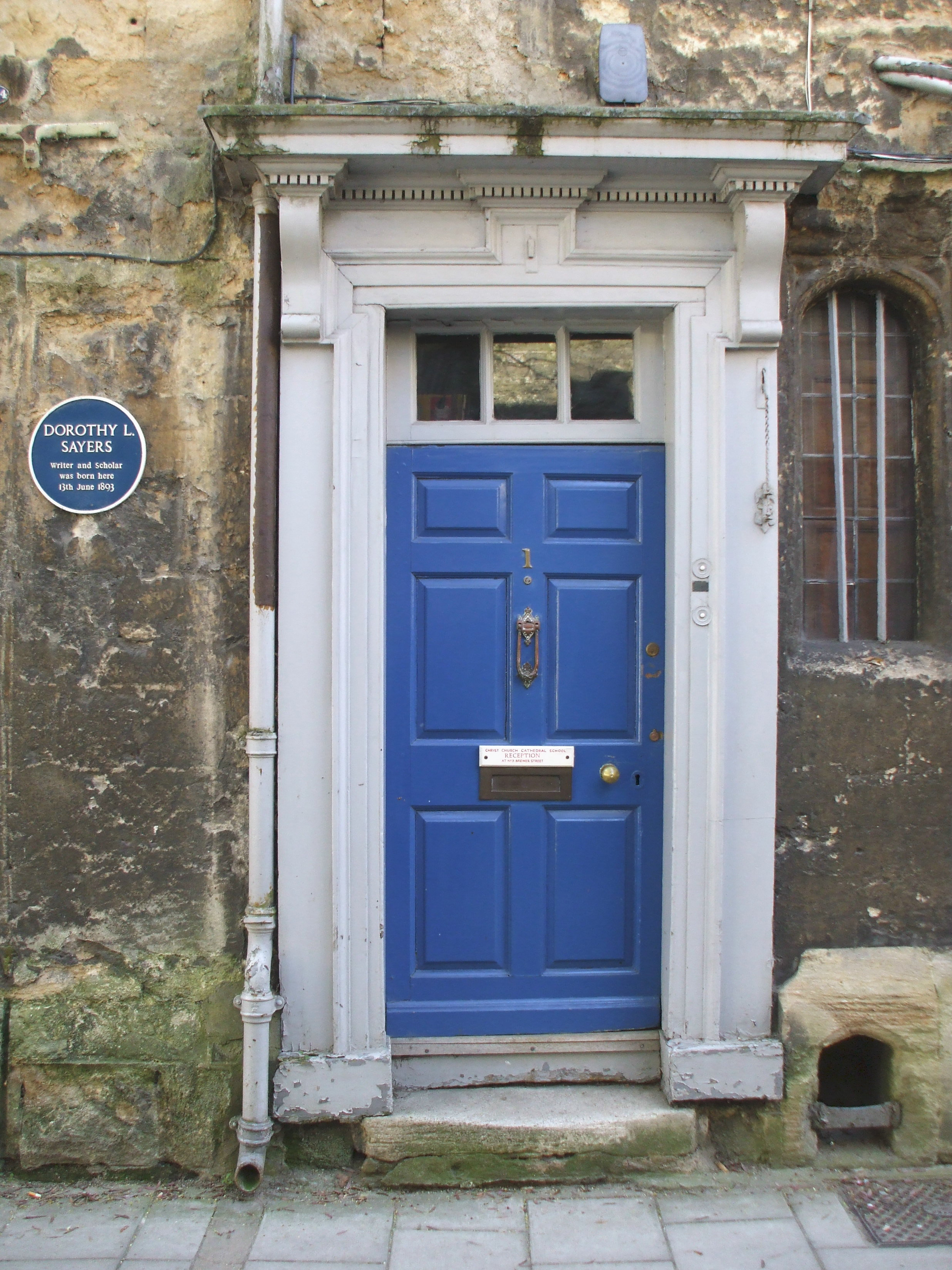
The door to 1 Brewer Street, Oxford, where Sayers was born

Sayers's novels have been criticised for racism, particularly antisemitism. Philip L. Scowcroft, in a study of her approach to race, cites examples from Unnatural Death such as "The second man ... seemed to wear the long-toed boots affected by Jew boys of the louder sort"; "'God bless my soul', said Sir Charles horrified, 'an English girl in the hands of a nigger. How abominable"; and "Nigger taste runs rather to boots and hair oil". Scowcroft also highlights the stereotypical physical descriptions of Jewish characters in Whose Body?, and the description of Jewish lifestyle by Wimsey's mother:

... it must be very inconvenient what with not working on Saturdays and circumcising the poor little babies and everything depending on the new moon and that funny kind of meat they have with such a slang-sounding name and never being able to have bacon for breakfast.

The writer Nancy-Lou Patterson observes that while Sayers reflected the prejudices of her time, the casual manner in which the racism is used is unpleasant, although, she notes, in none of her novels does Sayers make the villain or murderer Jewish. Brabazon, reflecting on the criticism against her generally, wrote:

The one characteristic of Dorothy's writing which might reasonably be considered offensive (and it is the connecting link between all the more specific sins of which she has been accused) is an air of rather patronizing superiority towards mankind in general. She patronizes the upper classes as much as the lower classes, and the Scotsman as much as the Jew.

Scowcroft concludes his examination by saying that although Sayers showed some elements of contemporary attitudes, "the much stronger evidence of her Jewish and foreign characters as they unfold in her books suggest that in the matter of 'racial prejudice', ... she and Lord Peter were more enlightened than the average." When Sayers was asked by her publisher if the French translation could tone down some of the references to Jewish characteristics and attributes, she replied "Certainly they can soften the thrusts against the Jews if they like and if there are any. My own opinion is that the only people who were presented in a favourable light were the Jews!"

=== Feminism ===
B. J. Rahn, an academic who specialises in detective fiction, believes Sayers was the first writer to use a whodunit to include feminist topics in her work. This includes the character of Harriet Vane, who is portrayed as a strong, independent woman. She has her own career, is strong enough to have a co-habiting relationship in an age when it was socially unacceptable and was nearly an equal to Wimsey as a detective. Vane takes a leading part in Sayers's penultimate novel, Gaudy Night, which is a whodunit without a murder. Anna Bogen, in her examination of the novel as a work of middlebrow fiction, views the work "positively in terms of both literary quality and feminist politics", calling it "a pioneering defense of women's education". The literary critic Melissa Schaub sees Vane as "a feminist model for everyday readers". Sandberg considers the introduction of Vane as "a watershed moment in Sayers's career as a detective writer" as it signalled the change towards her new literary form of detective novel. He sees Vane as "a literary self-portrait of Sayers", being financially independent, a career woman and one who eschewed the patriarchal expectations of inter-war Britain. In cohabiting with a lover and rejecting a marriage proposal from him and then initially rejecting marriage to Wimsey before accepting him, there is a display of Sayers's view of the basis of marriage: one that is "equal, intellectual, passionate, amusing, challenging", according to Sayers's biographer, Catherine Kenney.

The literary critic Laurel Young considers that Sayers was a feminist, as not only did she have strong female characters within her works, but also led an independent and seemingly non-conformist life. Sayers did not consider herself as such, and in a 1938 address, she said:

I was not sure I wanted to "identify myself" ... with feminism, and that the time for "feminism", in the old-fashioned sense of the word, had gone past. In fact, I think I went so far as to say that, under present conditions, an aggressive feminism might do more harm than good.

== Biographies and other books about Sayers ==
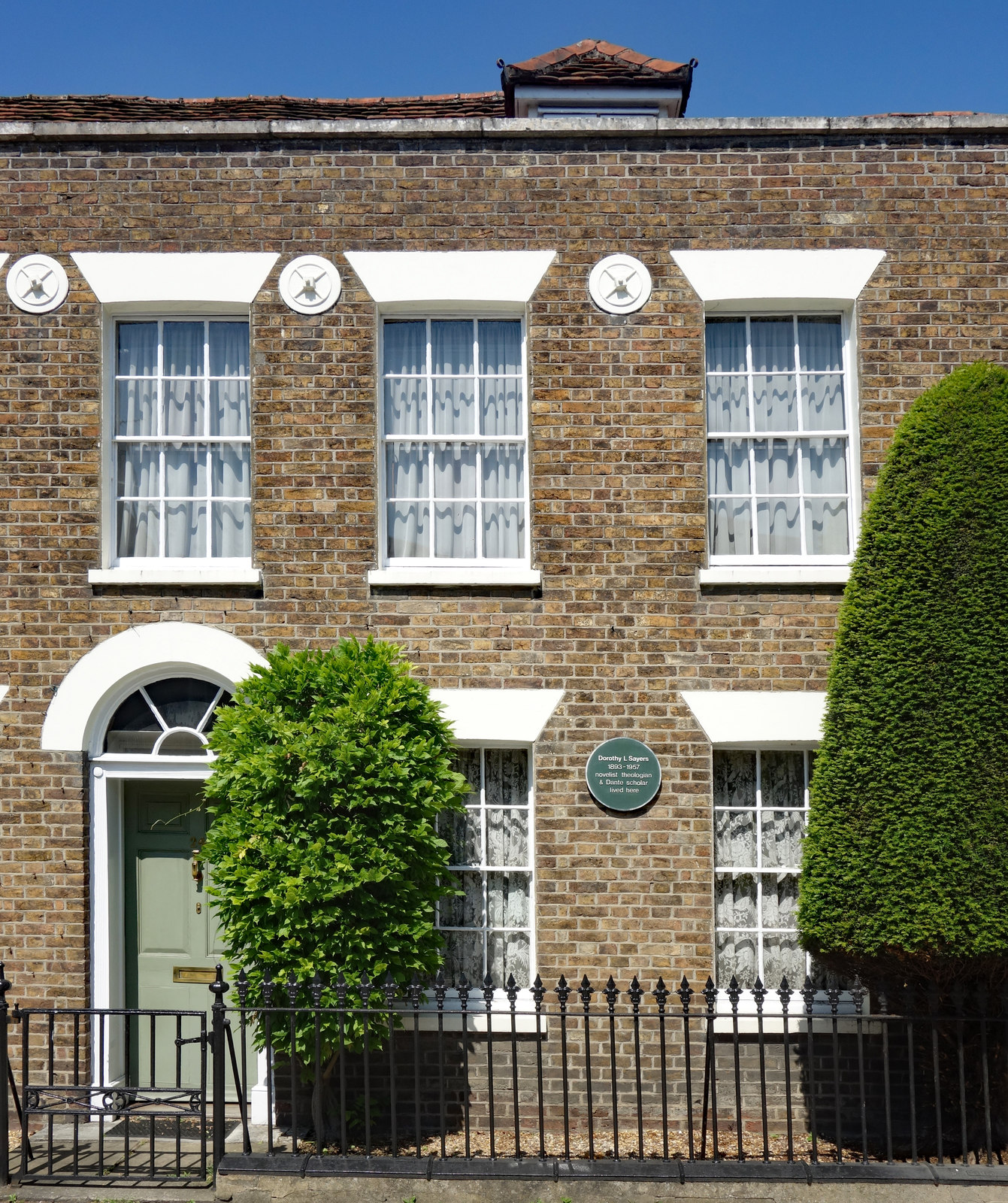
Sayers's house in Witham

Sayers published no autobiographical work, and told her literary executor, Muriel St Clare Byrne, that she wanted no biography of her to be written until fifty years after her death. This wish was not legally enforceable, and several biographies and literary studies of Sayers were published in the 1970s, including Dorothy L. Sayers: A Bio-Bibliography by Leslie H. Romer (1975), Such A Strange Lady: An Introduction to Dorothy L. Sayers by Janet Hitchman (1975), Maker and Craftsman: The Story of Dorothy L. Sayers by Alzina Dale (1978), and Dorothy L. Sayers: A Literary Biography by Ralph E. Hone (1979). Such books were written without access to Sayers's personal papers, which included a large archive of correspondence, an unpublished memoir of her early years and an unfinished autobiographical novel. Byrne and Anthony Fleming, Sayers's son, concluded around 1980 that the accounts thus far published were "incomplete or inaccurate or both" and that, despite Sayers's wish for a fifty-year moratorium, an authoritative biography should be written "which incorporated the available facts, before those who knew her had died and the records had been scattered".

At the request of Byrne and Fleming, the author James Brabazon, a friend of Sayers, wrote an authorised biography, aiming to give a full and accurate account of Sayers's life. It was published as Dorothy L. Sayers: The Life of a Courageous Woman in 1981, with a preface by Fleming and a foreword by P. D. James. Among later full-length biographies is Dorothy L. Sayers: Her Life And Soul by Barbara Reynolds, the then chairman of the Dorothy L. Sayers Society, published in 1993, marking the centenary of the subject's birth. Like Brabazon, Reynolds had been a friend of Sayers; the literary critic of The Times commented that her book "delivers a far warmer and more humane Sayers than previous biographers ... Where Ralph Hone and James Brabazon attempted to dig Sayers out of the social psychology of late Victorian England ... Reynolds allows her to speak in her own voice". In 2020 Colin Duriez published a further biography of Sayers, interspersing the factual material with imagined dramatised scenes and conversations.

Some studies of Sayers's works include biographical sections; among them are Dorothy L. Sayers by Mary Brian Durkin (1980), Dorothy L. Sayers, A Pilgrim Soul by Nancy Tischler (1980), and The Remarkable Case of Dorothy L. Sayers by Catherine Kenney (1990). Kenney is also the author of the article on Sayers in the ODNB, which replaced an earlier one by J. I. M. Stewart. Various aspects of Sayers's relationships and career have been examined in Dorothy and Jack: The Transforming Friendship of Dorothy L. Sayers and C. S. Lewis by Gina Dalfonzo and Subversive: Christ, Culture and the Shocking Dorothy L. Sayers by Crystal Downing (both 2020).

Under the aegis of the Dorothy L. Sayers Society, Reynolds collected and edited Sayers's letters, written between 1889 and 1957 and published in five volumes between 1995 and 2002. The final volume includes the texts of Sayers's autobiographical fragment and unfinished autobiographical novel first used by Brabazon in his 1981 biography.

== Legacy ==
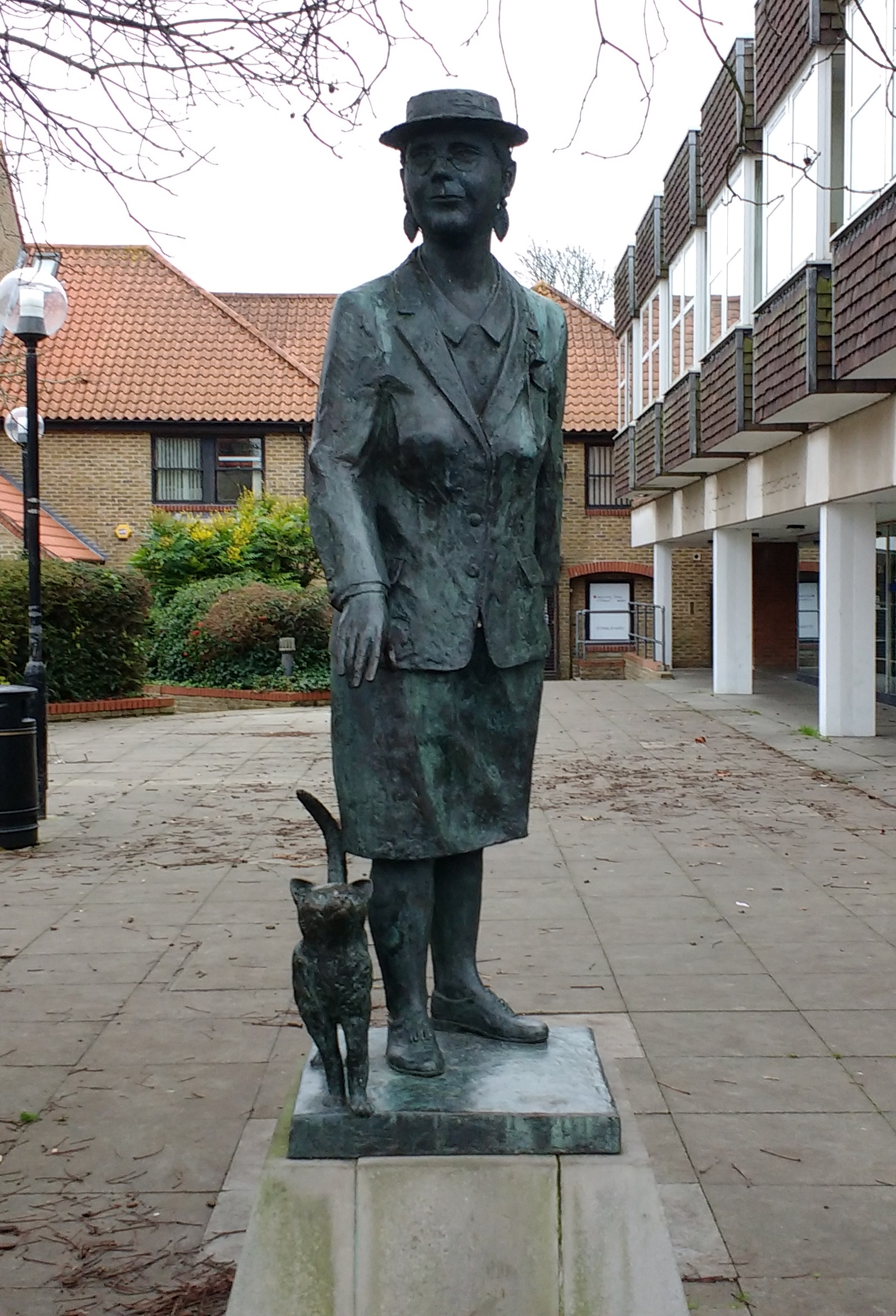
Statue of Sayers by John Doubleday opposite her former home in Witham, Essex

From the outset, Sayers aimed to develop the detective novel from the pure puzzle into a less artificial style, comparable with non-crime fiction of the period. A later writer of crime novels, P. D. James, writes that Sayers "did as much as any writer in the genre to develop the detective story from an ingenious but lifeless puzzle into an intellectually respectable branch of fiction with serious claims to be judged as a novel". As a reviewer Sayers wrote of one book by a now neglected writer, A. E. Fielding, "The plot is extremely intricate and full of red herrings, and the solution is kept a dark secret up to the last moment. The weakness ... is that the people never really come alive." She admired Agatha Christie, but in her own works Sayers moved away to some extent from the traditional whodunit towards what has been dubbed the "howdunit": "There is still an idea going about that the 'Who?' book is the only legitimate variety of the species. Yet, if we demand any sort of likeness to real life, the 'How?' book is much nearer to the facts". James notes that Sayers nonetheless wrote within the "Golden Age" conventions, (Note: The rules were codified in 1928 by the theologian and author Ronald Knox into his "Ten Commandments of Detection" which were to avoid clichés in plots and to allow readers a chance of working out who the murderer was.) with a central mystery, a closed circle of suspects and a solution that the reader can work out by logical deduction from clues "planted with deceptive cunning but essential fairness ... Those were not the days of the swift bash to the skull followed by 60,000 words of psychological insight".

Some of Sayers's stories have been filmed for the cinema and television. Robert Montgomery and Constance Cummings played Wimsey and Harriet Vane in a 1940 film adaptation of Busman's Honeymoon, and for BBC television Ian Carmichael played Wimsey in serial adaptations of six of the novels (none of them featuring Vane), broadcast between 1972 and 1975. Edward Petherbridge played Wimsey and Harriet Walter played Vane in television versions of Strong Poison, Have His Carcase and Gaudy Night in 1987. On BBC radio, in numerous adaptations of Sayers's detective stories, Wimsey has been played by more than a dozen actors, including Rex Harrison, Hugh Burden, Alan Wheatley, Ian Carmichael and Gary Bond. New productions of The Man Born to Be King were broadcast in every decade from the 1940s to the 1970s, and the cycle was repeated in the first and second decades of the 21st century.

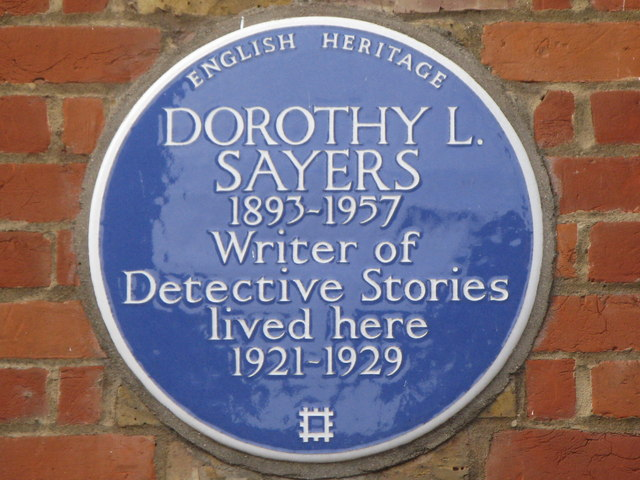
Blue plaque for Sayers in Great James Street, Bloomsbury

In 1998, at the invitation of Sayers's estate, Jill Paton Walsh published a completion of an unfinished Wimsey novel, Thrones, Dominations, which Sayers began in 1936 but abandoned after six chapters. It was well received—The Times found it "miraculously right" with "a thrilling denouement"—and Paton Walsh wrote three more Wimsey novels. A Presumption of Death (2002) incorporated extracts from The Wimsey Papers published by Sayers in 1939 and 1940. The Attenbury Emeralds (2010) was based on Wimsey's first case, referred to in a number of Sayers's novels; in The Times, Marcel Berlins said that Sayers would not have recognised that the book was not her own work. In The Late Scholar (2013), Peter and Harriet, now Duke and Duchess of Denver, (Note: The duke in the Sayers stories—Wimsey's elder brother Gerald—and the latter's son and heir, Viscount Saint-George, had by then died, respectively, of natural causes and on active service during the Second World War.) visit the fictional St Severin's College, Oxford, where Peter is Visitor.

In 1973 the minor planet 3627 Sayers was named after her. The asteroid was discovered by Luboš Kohoutek, but the name was suggested by the astronomer Brian G. Marsden, with whom Sayers consulted extensively during the last year of her life, in her attempt to rehabilitate the Roman poet Lucan. (Note: Pharsalia, Lucan's epic poem depicting the civil war between Julius Caesar and Pompey, includes several passages relating to astronomical and geographical matters. Lucan was criticised for inaccuracies in these parts by several critics, including the 20th-century poets A. E. Housman and Robert Graves. Sayers was in correspondence with Marsden about the astronomical aspects shortly before her death.) Sayers has a feast day on 17 December in the American Episcopal Church liturgical calendar, given because of her work as a Christian apologist and spiritual writer. In 2000 English Heritage installed a blue plaque at 24 Great James Street, Bloomsbury, where Sayers lived between 1921 and 1929. The Dorothy L. Sayers Society was founded in 1976 and, as at 2024, continues in its mission "to promote the study of the life, works and thoughts of this great scholar and writer, to encourage the performance of her plays and the publication of books by and about her, to preserve original material for posterity and to provide assistance for researchers".

== See also ==
- Classical education
- List of English translations of the Divine Comedy

== Notes, references and sources ==
=== Sources ===
==== Books ====
- Adams, Pauline (1996). Somerville for Women: An Oxford College, 1879-1993. Oxford: Oxford University Press. ISBN 978-0-1992-0179-2. Archived from the original on 13 December 2023.
- Benstock, Bernard (1985). "Dorothy L. Sayers". In Stayley, Thomas F. (ed.). Dictionary of Literary Biography: British Novelists, 1890–1929: Modernists. Detroit: Gale. ISBN 978-0-8103-1714-7.
- Brabazon, James (1981). Dorothy L. Sayers: The Life of a Courageous Woman. London: Victor Gollancz. ISBN 978-0-57-502728-2.
- Carpenter, Humphrey (1979). The Inklings: C. S. Lewis, J. R. R. Tolkien, Charles Williams and Their Friends. Boston, Massachusetts: Houghton Mifflin. ISBN 978-0-3952-7628-0.
- Coomes, David (1993). Dorothy L. Sayers: A Careless Rage for Life. Oxford: Lion. ISBN 978-0-7459-2241-6.
- Dade, Penny (2008). Drink Talking: 100 Years of Alcohol Advertising. London: Middlesex University Press. ISBN 978-1-90-475040-6.
- Dale, Alzina Stone (1992) [1978]. Maker & Craftsman: The Story of Dorothy L. Sayers (second ed.). Wheaton: H. Shaw. ISBN 978-0-87-788523-8.
- Downing, Crystal (2004). Writing Performances: The Stages of Dorothy L. Sayers. Basingstoke, Hampshire: Palgrave Macmillan. ISBN 978-1-3497-3248-7.
- Durkin, Mary Brian (1980). Dorothy L. Sayers. Boston: Twayne. ISBN 978-0-80-576778-0.
- Gilbert, Colleen B. (1979). A Bibliography of the Works of Dorothy L. Sayers. London: Macmillan. ISBN 978-0-33-326267-2.
- Goetz, Joseph W. (1984). Mirrors of God. Cincinnati, Ohio: St. Anthony Messenger Press. ISBN 978-0-86716-031-4.
- Griffiths, Mark (2005). Guinness Is Guinness: the Colourful Story of a Black and White Brand. London: Marshall Cavendish. ISBN 978-1-90-487928-2.
- Hall, Trevor H. (1980). Dorothy L. Sayers, Nine Literary Studies. London: Duckworth. ISBN 978-0-7156-1455-6.
- Hannay, Margaret P. (1980). "Harriet's Influence on the Characterization of Lord Peter Wimsey". In Hannay, Margaret P. (ed.). As Her Whimsey Took Her: Critical Essays on the Work of Dorothy L. Sayers. Kent, Ohio: Kent State University Press. pp. 36–50. ISBN 978-0-8733-8227-4.
- Hone, Ralph E. (1979). Dorothy L. Sayers: A Literary Biography. Kent, Ohio: Kent State University Press. ISBN 978-0-87-338228-1.
- James, P. D. (2009). Talking About Detective Fiction. Oxford: Bodleian Library. ISBN 978-1-8512-4309-9.
- Kenney, Catherine McGehee (1990). The Remarkable Case of Dorothy L. Sayers. Kent, Ohio: Kent State University Press. ISBN 978-0-8733-8410-0.
- Latham, Sean (2003). "Am I a Snob?": Modernism and the Novel. Ithaca, New York: Cornell University Press. ISBN 978-0-8014-4022-9.
- Lesser Feasts and Fasts 2018. New York City: Church Publishing, Inc. 2019. ISBN 978-1-6406-5234-7.
- McLaughlin, Martin (2021). "Translations". In Gragnolati, Manuele; Lombardi, Elena; Southerden, Francesca (eds.). The Oxford Handbook of Dante. Oxford: Oxford University Press. pp. 583–601. ISBN 978-0-1918-6034-8.
- Merry, Bruce (1983). "Dorothy L. Sayers: Mystery and Demystification". In Benstock, Bernard (ed.). Essays on Detective Fiction. London: Palgrave Macmillan UK. pp. 18–32. doi:10.1007/978-1-349-17313-6_2. ISBN 978-1-349-17313-6.
- Miskimmin, Esme (2010). "Dorothy L. Sayers (1893–1957)". In Rzepka, Charles J.; Horsley, Lee (eds.). A Companion to Crime Fiction. Malden, Massachusetts: Wiley-Blackwell. pp. 438–449. ISBN 978-1-4051-6765-9.
- Paton Walsh, Jill (2013). The Late Scholar. London: Hodder. ISBN 978-1-444-76087-3.
- Pearce, Joseph (1996). Wisdom and Innocence: A Life of G. K. Chesterton. London: Hodder and Stoughton. ISBN 978-0-34-067132-0.
- Perry, Anne (1993). "Dorothy L. Sayers on Dante". In Stone Dale, Alzina (ed.). Dorothy L. Sayers: The Centenary Celebration. New York City: Walker. pp. 109–122. ISBN 978-0-8027-3224-8.
- Pitt, Valerie (1990). "Dorothy L. Sayers: The Masks of Lord Peter". In Bloom, Clive (ed.). Twentieth-Century Suspense: The Thriller Comes of Age. Basingstoke: Macmillan. ISBN 978-0-3334-7592-8.
- Plain, Gill (1996). Women's Fiction of the Second World War: Gender, Power and Resistance. New York City: St. Martin's Press. ISBN 978-0-3121-6413-3.
- Rahn, B. J. (1993). "The Marriage of True Minds". In Stone Dale, Alzina (ed.). Dorothy L. Sayers: The Centenary Celebration. New York City: Walker. pp. 51–66. ISBN 978-0-8027-3224-8.
- Reynolds, Barbara (1993). Dorothy L. Sayers: Her Life and Soul. London: Hodder and Stoughton. ISBN 978-0-34-058151-3.
- Reynolds, Barbara (2005). The Passionate Intellect: Dorothy L. Sayers' Encounter with Dante. Eugene, Oregon: Wipf and Stock. ISBN 978-1-5975-2100-0.
- Sandberg, Eric (2021). Dorothy L. Sayers: A Companion to the Mystery Fiction. Jefferson: McFarland. ISBN 978-1-47-667348-6.
- Sayers, Dorothy L. (1937). Busman's Honeymoon: A Love Story with Detective Interruptions. New York City: Harper & Row. OCLC 877175.
- Sayers, Dorothy L. (1955). The Divine Comedy. Cantica II: Purgatory. London: Penguin. OCLC 1029278941.
- Sayers, Dorothy L. (1956). The New Sayers Omnibus. London: Victor Gollancz. OCLC 503786174.
- Sayers, Dorothy L. (1963) [1955]. The Comedy of Dante Alighieri, the Florentine. Cantica II: Purgatory. New York City: Basic Books.
- Sayers, Dorothy L. (1986) [1928]. The Unpleasantness at the Bellona Club. New York City: Harper & Row. ISBN 978-0-0605-5026-4.
- Sayers, Dorothy L. (1987) [1941]. The Mind of the Maker. San Francisco: Harper and Row. ISBN 978-0-06-067077-1.
- Sayers, Dorothy L. (1992) [1930]. Strong Poison. London: New English Library. ISBN 978-0-45-001392-8.
- Sayers, Dorothy L. (2016) [1933]. Murder Must Advertise. London: Hodder. ISBN 978-1-4736-2138-1.
- Sayers, Dorothy L. (2017). Edwards, Martin (ed.). Taking Detective Stories Seriously: The Collected Crime Reviews of Dorothy L. Sayers. Perth: Tippermuir. ISBN 978-0-9563374-9-8.
- Sayers, Dorothy L. (1996). Reynolds, Barbara (ed.). The Letters of Dorothy L. Sayers: Volume 1, 1899–1936, The Making of a Detective Novelist. London: Sceptre. ISBN 978-0-34-066636-4.
- Schmadel, Lutz D. (1999). Dictionary of Minor Planet Names. New York City: Springer-Verlag. ISBN 978-3-5406-6292-1.
- Smith, Timothy d'Arch (2001). "Introduction". The Quorum: A Magazine of Friendship. Hubbardston: Asphodel. OCLC 48146487. Archived from the original on 26 September 2023.
- Symons, Julian (1962). The Detective Story in Britain. London: Longman. OCLC 497993.
- Symons, Julian (1984). "Preface". The Scoop and Behind the Scenes. New York City: Harper and Row. ISBN 978-0-44-175505-9.
- Watson, Colin (1971). Snobbery with Violence: English Crime Stories and Their Audience. London: Eyre Methuen. ISBN 978-0-4134-6570-2.
- Wolfe, Kenneth (1984). The Churches and the British Broadcasting Corporation, 1922–1956: The Politics of Broadcast Religion. London: SCM Press. ISBN 978-0-33-401932-9.
- Worsley, Lucy (2014). A Very British Murder. London: BBC Books. ISBN 978-1-84-990651-7.
- Youngberg, Ruth Tanis (1982). Dorothy L. Sayers: A Reference Guide. Boston: G. K. Hall. ISBN 978-0-8161-8198-8.

==== Journals ====
- Barrows, Mary Prentice (December 1965). "Translating Dante: The Art of the Impossible". Italica. 42 (4): 358–370. doi:10.2307/477521. JSTOR 477521.
- Bergin, Thomas G. (1955). "On Translating Dante". Annual Report of the Dante Society, with Accompanying Papers (73): 3–22. ISSN 1948-1608. JSTOR 40166017.
- Bogen, Anna (1 December 2016). ""Neither Art Itself nor Life Itself": Gaudy Night, the Detective Novel, and the Middlebrow". Genre. 49 (3): 255–272. doi:10.1215/00166928-3659074.
- Dove, George N. (1981). "The Rules of the Game". Studies in Popular Culture. 4: 67–72. ISSN 0888-5753. JSTOR 45018078.
- Downing, Crystal (October 2013). "Angelic Work: The Medieval Sensibilities of Dorothy L. Sayers". Journal of Inklings Studies. 3 (2): 111–132. doi:10.3366/ink.2013.3.2.7.
- Freedman, Ariela (June 2010). "Dorothy Sayers and the Case of the Shell-Shocked Detective". Partial Answers: Journal of Literature and the History of Ideas. 88 (2): 365–387. doi:10.1353/pan.0.0176. S2CID 145223415.
- Green, Martin (14 March 1963). "The Detection of a Snob. On Lord Peter Wimsey". The Listener: 461, 464. ISSN 0024-4392.
- Harrison, Barbara G. (November 1974). "Dorothy L. Sayers and the Tidy Art of Detective Fiction". Ms.: 66–69.
- Hunt, Margaret Wiedemann (June 2017). "'Playwrights Are Not Evangelists': Dorothy L. Sayers on Translating the Gospels into Drama". Studies in Church History. 53: 405–419. doi:10.1017/stc.2016.24. S2CID 193720297.
- Lott, Monica (2013). "Dorothy L. Sayers, the Great War, and Shell Shock". Interdisciplinary Literary Studies. 15 (1): 103–126. doi:10.5325/intelitestud.15.1.0103. S2CID 161022372.
- Marsden, Brian G. (1987). "Dorothy L. Sayers and the Truth About Lucan". VII: Journal of the Marion E. Wade Center. 8: 85–96. ISSN 0271-3012. JSTOR 45296179.
- Mayhall, Laura E. Nym (October 2021). "Aristocracy Must Advertise: Repurposing the Nobility in Interwar British Fiction". Journal of British Studies. 60 (4): 771–792. doi:10.1017/jbr.2021.54. S2CID 236611989.
- Patterson, Nancy-Lou (June 1978). "Images of Judaism and Anti-Semitism in the Novels of Dorothy L. Sayers". Sayers Review (209): 17–24.
- Prescott, Barbara (5 June 2016). "Dorothy Sayers and the Mutual Admiration Society: Friendship and Creative Writing in an Oxford Women's Literary Group". Inklings Forever: Published Colloquium Proceedings 1997–2016. 10 (1). Archived from the original on 2 June 2021.
- Reynolds, Barbara (1999). "Fifty Years On: Dorothy L. Sayers and Dante". VII: Journal of the Marion E. Wade Center. 16: 3–6. ISSN 0271-3012. JSTOR 45296739.
- Salter, G. Connor (2022). "Review of Dorothy L. Sayers, A Biography: Death, Dante and Lord Peter Wimsey; Dorothy and Jack: The Transforming Friendship of Dorothy L. Sayers and C. S. Lewis, Dalfonzo Gina". Mythlore. 40 (2): 254–258. ISSN 0146-9339. JSTOR 48659547.
- Sayers, Dorothy L. (2005). "Are Women Human?: Address Given to a Women's Society, 1938". Logos: A Journal of Catholic Thought and Culture. 8 (4): 165–178. doi:10.1353/log.2005.0040. S2CID 144518551.
- Schaub, Melissa (2013). "Middlebrow Feminism and the Politics of Sentiment: From the Moonstone to Dorothy L. Sayers". Modern Language Studies. 43 (1): 10–27. ISSN 0047-7729. JSTOR 24616716.
- Scowcroft, Philip L. (1984). "Was Dorothy L. Sayers Racist?". Sidelights on Sayers. 7: 15–19. ISSN 0969-188X. JSTOR 45305403.
- Scowcroft, Philip L. (1990). "The War Service of Gerald, Viscount Saint-George". Sidelights on Sayers. 31: 7–9. ISSN 0969-188X. JSTOR 5305578.
- Young, Laurel (1 July 2005). "Dorothy L. Sayers and the New Woman Detective Novel". Clues: A Journal of Detection. 23 (4): 39–53. doi:10.3200/CLUS.23.4.39-53.
