= Alfred Staines =

English cricketer (1838–1910)

Personal information
- Born: 22 May 1838; Charlton, Kent
- Died: 13 June 1910 (aged 72); Sydenham, London
- Batting: Right-handed
- Role: Wicket-keeper

Domestic team information
- Years: Team
- 1863–1864: Kent

Career statistics
Competition	First-class
Matches	5
Runs scored	6
Batting average	1.00
100s/50s	0/0
Top score	2
Catches/stumpings	4/5
- Source: ESPNcricinfo, 2 February 2012

Alfred Staines (22 May 1838 – 13 June 1910) was an English professional cricketer. Staines was a wicket-keeper who played in five first-class cricket matches for Kent County Cricket Club between 1863 and 1864.

== Early life ==
Staines was born at Charlton in Kent in 1838, the son of Joseph and Caroline (née Knight) Staines. His father was an agricultural labourer and Staines was one of nine children. A wicket-keeper for Charlton Cricket Club, he impressed during two trial matches in 1863 and made his first-class debut for Kent against Surrey at The Oval in July.

== Cricket ==
The Kent team at the time has been described as "seriously short of talent", and Staines replaced William Fryer behind the stumps following Fryer's decision to give up keeping wicket after losing an eye the previous year. After making scores of two and one in his two innings and taking three catches on debut, he played in Kent's remaining two county matches during the season, although Robert Bennett replaced him for the Canterbury Cricket Week match against an England XI.

Following two heavy defeats in the county's first two matches of the following season, Staines, who scored only six runs in his five first-class matches, dropped out of the county team, replaced by Bennett for most of the remainder of the season. He continued to play club cricket for Charlton and was a professional at the Old Change Club in 1866 and 1867.

== Personal life ==
Professionally Staines delivered letters and then trained as a solicitor's clerk, remaining in the legal profession for the rest of his working life. He married Annie White at Charlton in 1862; the couple had two daughters. He died at Sydenham in London in June 1910 aged 72.

== Bibliography ==
- Carlaw, Derek (2020). Kent County Cricketers, A to Z: Part One (1806–1914) (PDF). Cardiff: ACS.
