= Hangman's Holiday =

1933 short story collection by Dorothy Sayers

First edition

Hangman's Holiday is a collection of short stories, mostly murder mysteries, by Dorothy L. Sayers. This collection, the ninth in the Lord Peter Wimsey series, was first published by Gollancz in 1933, and has been reprinted a number of times since, for example the 1995 paperback: ISBN 978-0-06-104362-8).

== Contents ==
- Lord Peter Wimsey stories:
  - "The Image in the Mirror" – Wimsey must help a man with situs inversus, who believes he is going mad after being haunted by a doppelganger.
  - "The Incredible Elopement of Lord Peter Wimsey" – A man studying Basque culture enlists Wimsey's help in saving an expatriate American woman whom the villagers believe is bewitched.
  - "The Queen's Square" – Wimsey attends a fancy dress ball during the Christmas season, where several people dressed as chess pieces become suspected of killing a female blackmailer.
  - "The Necklace of Pearls" – Wimsey tries to avoid scandal when a fun-filled Christmas Eve at Sir Septimus Shale's house turns into an uncomfortable affair after a priceless pearl necklace goes missing.
- Montague Egg stories:
  - "The Poisoned Dow '08" – Mr. Egg arrives at a client's house to find him dead, and the police in need of evidence about a shipment of bottles Mr. Egg delivered earlier.
  - "Sleuths on the Scent" – Mr. Egg uses his knowledge of various professions to flush out a murderer hiding in a pub.
  - "Murder in the Morning" – Mr. Egg finds himself one of those suspected in the murder of a client, and gives evidence at inquest.
  - "One Too Many" – Mr. Egg's knowledge of the train ticket system helps the police find an absconding banker and his secretary.
  - "Murder at Pentecost" – While trying to win a bet against an Oxford University student, Mr. Egg discovers the motive and opportunity of a very clever murderer.
  - "Maher-Shalal-Hashbaz" – Mr. Egg helps an impoverished child sell her pet, a fierce orange cat with a Biblical name. The cat subsequently runs away from its new home, and in tracing it back Mr. Egg discovers the brutal murder of more than fifty cats and an elderly man.
- Other stories:
  - "The Man Who Knew How" – A man becomes obsessed with finding and stopping what he believes is a serial killer.
  - "The Fountain Plays" – A man being blackmailed tries to figure out how to rid himself of his tormentor, but finds himself at the mercy of a second blackmailer.
