= Softline =

Softline may refer to:

- Softline (South African software company), purchased by the Sage Group
- Softline International, former company now part of Noventiq, a global information technology company
- Softline Pastel, accounting software

== See also ==
- Softlines, departments in a retail store consisting of textile merchandise, such as clothing, footwear, jewelry, linens and towels; see Category:Softlines (retail)
- Hardline (disambiguation)
