= Ground biscuit =

Form of biscuit

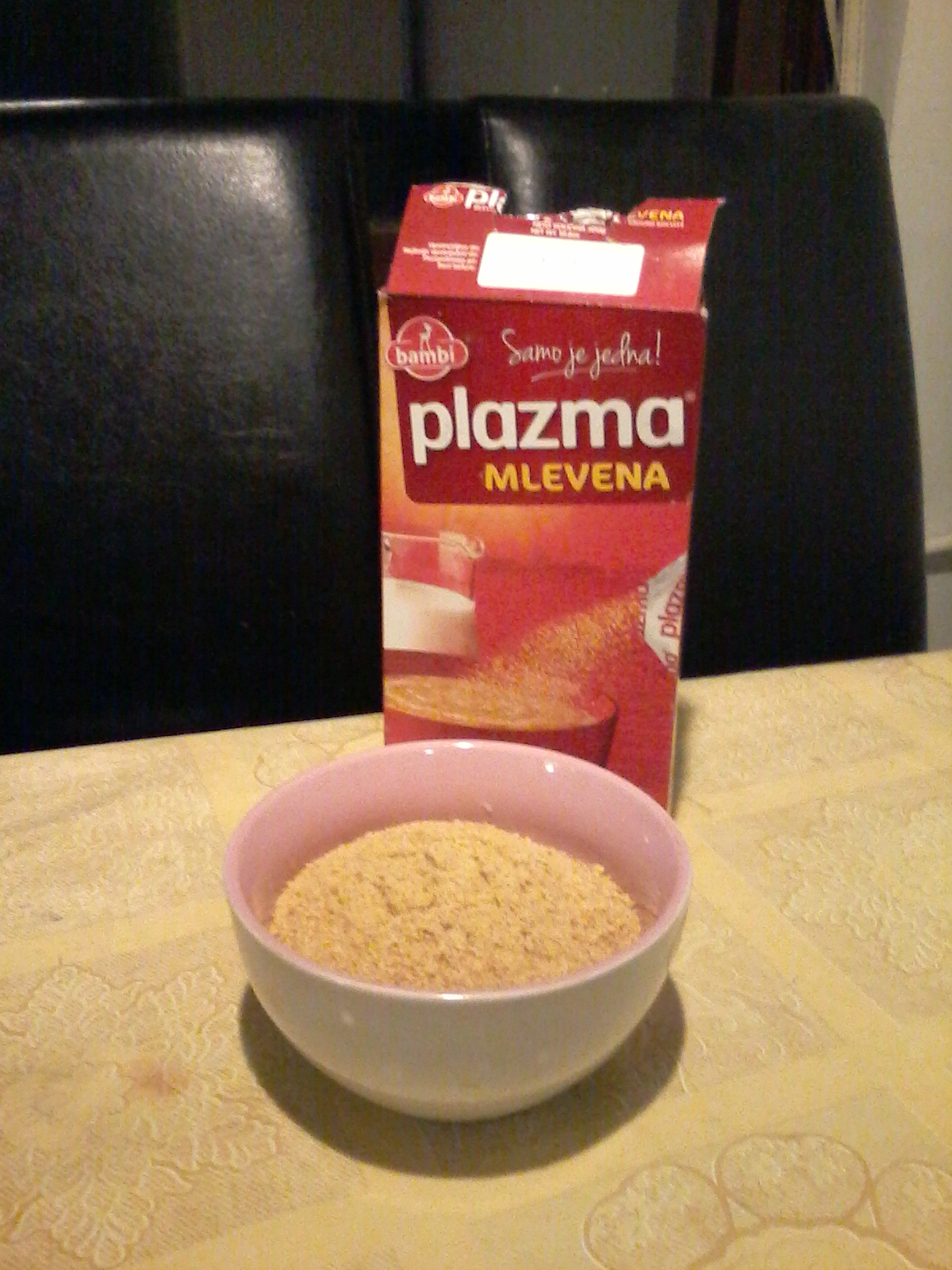
- Plazma ground biscuits

Ground biscuit is a form of biscuit, usually baked, flour-based food products, that is specially processed by grinding. It is usually served with warm or cold milk or tea, or it can be served in a crepe. One recipe for biscuit powder was originally based on the Italian plasmon biscuits made by the Plasmon Society (now owned by the H. J. Heinz Company). Biscuit powders like Plazma are popular in countries of the former Yugoslavia and are also exported to other countries.

== Serving ==
Ground biscuit can be combined with milk or crushed and served with crepes. They are used as an ingredient of many sweets, such as ice cream cake and milkshakes.
