= SpeedTax =

Sales tax automation SaaS product

SpeedTax is a software-as-a-service (SaaS) platform designed to assist businesses with automating aspects of sales tax compliance, including calculation, reporting, filing and remittance. The platform includes reporting features related to treasury oversight and audit documentation. The software supports electronic preparation of tax returns and provides downloadable PDF forms for submission.

== SpeedTax Integrations ==
The SpeedTax SaaS sales tax management service integrates with numerous accounting software applications, including Sage MAS 90 ERP, Sage MAS 200 ERP, Sage Accpac ERP, Microsoft Dynamics GP, and Intuit's Quickbooks Pro, Premier and Enterprise Editions.

== SpeedTax Software Developer Kit (SDK) ==
In addition to existing ERP integrations, SpeedTax offers software development kits (SDK) available for integration into eCommerce, POS and custom ERP applications. The SpeedTax SDK includes development tools and documentation for integrating the SpeedTax API with financial, e-Commerce or point-of-sale applications. The service provides automated access to sales tax rates, jurisdiction boundaries and taxability data. SpeedTax offers multiple service tiers. The Plus version includes additional automation features, while the Pro version provides a dashboard interface for managing multiple clients.

== Streamlined Sales Tax Project (SSTP) ==
Organized in March 2000, the Streamlined Sales Tax Project (SSTP) objective is to simplify and modernize sales tax and use tax collection and administration in the United States.

SpeedTax was certified as both a CSP (certified service provider) and CAS (certified automated solution) by the SST Governing Board in 2008.

The SSTP is developing a framework intended to simplify voluntary state tax compliance for e-commerce companies by standardizing processes across participating states. The incentive the SSTP is offering companies is that rather than try to work out how much tax a company owes for each locality, they can instead use a CSP. In addition, "the states that are in compliance with SSUTA (Member States) will offer advantages to those sellers who use a CSP." Today, 22 states have adopted the simplification measures in the Agreement (representing over 31% of the population) and more states are moving to adopt the simplification measure.
