= Bambi (company) =

Serbian food company

Bambi a.d.
- Official logo
- Native name: Бамби
- Company type: Joint-stock company
- Industry: Branded food
- Founded: 11 December 1989; 36 years ago (Current form); 1967; 59 years ago (Founded)
- Headquarters: Požarevac, Serbia
- Key people: Dragan Stajković (General director)
- Products: Biscuits, chocolates
- Brands: Plazma, Wellness, Zlatni Pek, Josh
- Revenue: ▲€128.61 million (2023)
- Operating income: ▼€27.7 million (2023)
- Net income: ▼€22.78 million (2023)
- Total assets: ▲€135.47 million (2023)
- Total equity: ▲€46.8 million (2023)
- Owner: Coca-Cola HBC Serbia (100%)
- Number of employees: 664 (2023)
- Website: bambi.rs
- Footnotes / references Business ID: 07162936; Tax ID: 100436827

Bambi a.d. (Serbian Cyrillic: Бамби а.д.) is a food manufacturing company headquartered in the town of Požarevac, Serbia. One of its signature products is a biscuit called Plazma, also known as Lane outside of former Yugoslavia. It is currently owned by Coca-Cola HBC Serbia.

In 1968, the company started production of their now famous Plazma biscuit, originally a variation of Plasmon biscuits, and today it is one of their best selling products. In that time, "Plasmon" sued "Bambi" for stealing recipes and forms of cookies. That dispute, which was conducted in Greece, was lost by the Italians. Milos Reljin, a technologist, reduced the weight so that it did not match the "plasmon", and he also changed the recipe, because he added a new ingredient. At that time, a gentleman's agreement was made between the two factories. That "plasmon" bypasses the Yugoslav market, and that "plasma" goes to the western market under the name "lane". The font of the text "Bambi" was also used by the very small Yugoslav band "Bambi band".

== History ==
Bambi's former logo

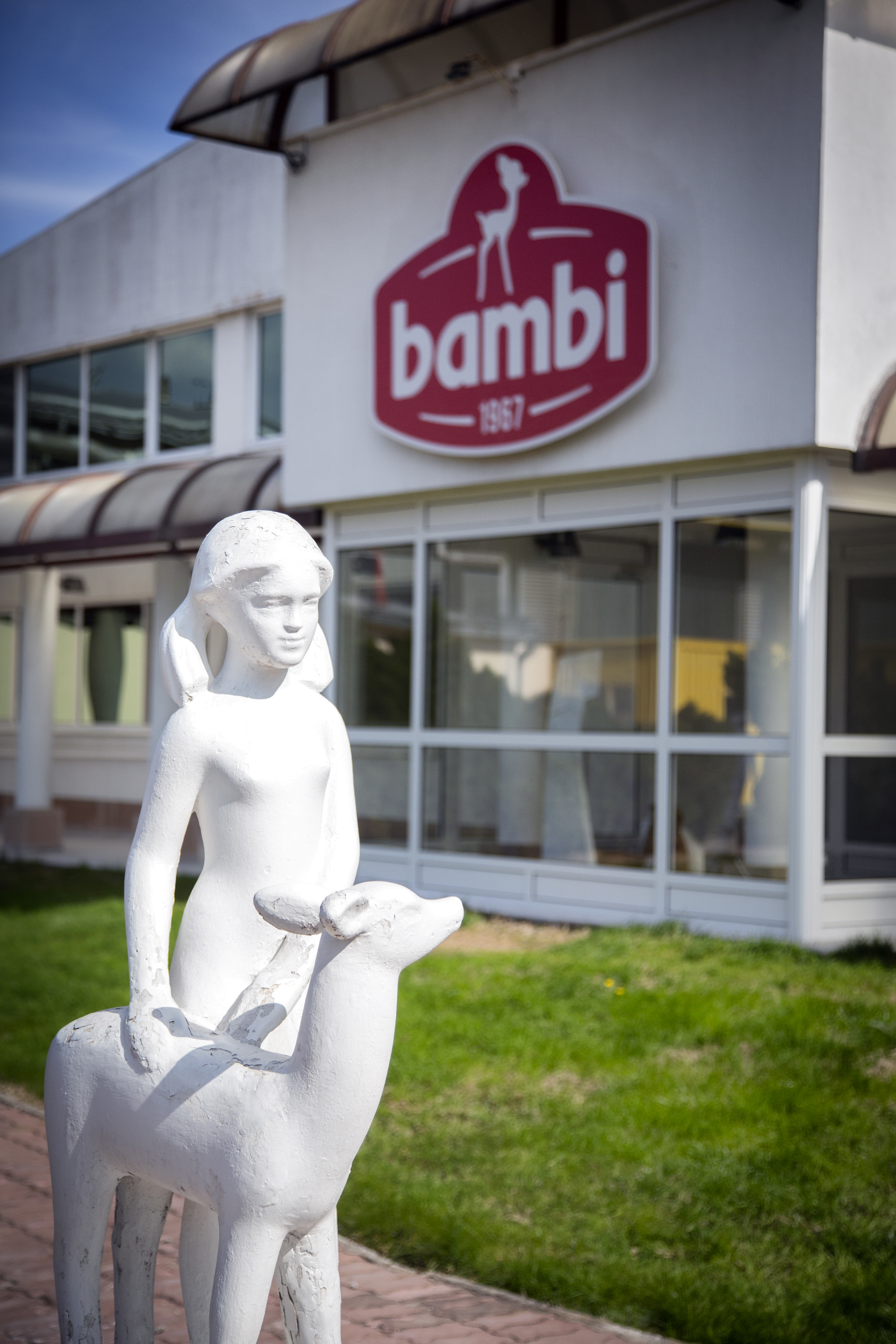
Bambi's facility seen from outside in Požarevac

The company was founded in 1967 on initiative of Momčilo Filipović and later Petar Tutavac, with support of the League of Communists of Yugoslavia. From the start, the company's focus was on manufacturing biscuits made out of domestically grown grains with an emphasis on healthy food. Within the first ten years of its existence the company had 230 full-time employees and manufactured 3,100 tons of products. In 1979 it received its first award for consistency in quality. Over the years the company grew and expanded to different regions of former Yugoslavia.

In 1968, the company started production of their now famous Plazma biscuit, originally a variation of Plasmon biscuits, and today it is one of their best selling products. In 1990 the company started production of another well-known product called Grandma's cookie (in Serbian, Bakin kolač) type of waffle, which is no longer produced. In 1997 the company was the first in the country to receive international certificate for the standard in quality management ISO 9001 in food industry.

In mid-2004 Bambi became part of the Danube Foods Group, managed by Salford Investment Fund. In February 2015, Salford Investment Fund sold their interests in Bambi to Mid Europa Partners. Since 2015, assets of Mid Europe Partners in Serbia which include Bambi, Knjaz Miloš and Imlek, are managed by "Moji Brendovi" consultant firm.

In mid-2017, the company changed its logo and introduced new products. As of 2018, Bambi is one of the largest food companies in Serbia.

On 18 February 2019, the Coca-Cola HBC announced a deal valued at €260 million to acquire Bambi from Mid Europa Partners.

== See also ==
- List of companies of the Socialist Federal Republic of Yugoslavia
