= Hardline (disambiguation) =

Hardline is a political label.

Hardline, Hard Line or hardliner may also refer to:

== Culture ==
- Hardline (subculture), a militant offshoot of straight edge

== Music ==
- Hard Line (album), a 1985 album by American band The Blasters
- Hardline (band), an American hard rock group
- Hardliner (band), a Canadian hard rock band

== Politics ==
- Hard Line (political party), a Danish far-right political party

== Science and technology ==
- "Hardline", term for a connection via physical wires and cables, such as "hard line" coaxial cable

== Video games ==
- Hardline (video game), a 1996 video game developed by Cryo Interactive Entertainment
- Battlefield Hardline, a 2015 video game published by Electronic Arts

== See also ==
- Hardlines, a business term for retail products including many non-information goods; see Category:Hardlines (retail)
- Softline (disambiguation)
