= Knjaz Miloš =

Serbian carbonated mineral water

- Official logo
- Native name: Књаз Милош
- Company type: Joint-stock company
- Industry: Beverages
- Founded: 21 December 2000; 25 years ago (Current form); 1811; 215 years ago (Founded)
- Headquarters: Južna industrijska zona bb, Aranđelovac, Serbia
- Area served: Worldwide
- Key people: Miloš Stojisavljević (General Manager)
- Products: Water, carbonated soft drinks, other non-alcoholic beverages
- Revenue: ▲€71.50 million (2018)
- Net income: ▲€6.41 million (2018)
- Total assets: ▼€58.32 million (2018)
- Total equity: ▲€10.42 million (2018)
- Owner: Karlovarske mineralni vody (KMV) and PepsiCo (100%)
- Number of employees: 651 (2018)
- Website: knjaz.rs
- Footnotes / references Business ID: 07347383; Tax ID: 100994867

Knjaz Miloš (Serbian Cyrillic: Књаз Милош, pronounced [kɲâːz mîlɔʃ]) is a Serbian carbonated mineral water producer and distributor based in Aranđelovac, Serbia.

In addition to its centerpiece Knjaz Miloš carbonated mineral water, the company also produces natural mineral water Aqua Viva, Guarana energy drink, a line of carbonated and still non-alcoholic beverages with fruit juice – ReMix Knjaz, Tube, Golf, and Gusto brands.

== History ==
The beginning of the practice of using spring water goes back to the year 1811 when Dositej Obradović visited the spring and utilized its water for medical purposes.

Twenty-five years later, Russian experts and the chief of Sanitation of the Principality of Serbia, Dr. Emerih Lindemajer, carried out the first official analysis of the properties and quality of this mineral water. Impressed by the results and concurrent special medicinal properties of the water, they brought the first visitors to the source and launched the first organized exploitation of water.

In 1858, Serbian prince Miloš Obrenović placed the source under the protection of the state and decided to make a city in the area. As a sign of gratitude, the locals and visitors named the spring after the prince, upon which the concept of the industrial exploitation of Bukovička Spa's naturally carbonated water began to unfold.

Knjaz Miloš is bearing the name of Miloš Obrenović, Prince of Serbia from 1815 to 1839. It operates in its current form since 2000.

In 2004, the "FPP Balkan Limited" investment fund, part of London-based "FPP Group", became the majority owner in Knjaz Miloš. The takeover was done in two stages. In September 2004, "FPP Balkan Limited" bought through takeover bid a 25% stake in company's ownership structure. In December 2004, it launched another takeover bid and bought another 33% of shares, which made a total of €57 million investment for 58% of shares in company's ownership structure.

In January 2005, the "FPP Balkan Limited" added "Salford Investment Fund" as their partners. In December 2006, Knjaz Miloš a.d. obtained an ISO 22000 certification for food safety, thus way being able to put its products on European Union market.

In February 2015, "Salford Investment Fund" sold their interests in Knjaz Miloš to Mid Europa Partners. Since 2015, assets of Mid Europe Partners in Serbia which include Knjaz Miloš, Imlek and Bambi, are managed by "Moji Brendovi" consultant firm.

In 2019, a joint venture between the Czech Karlovarské Minerální Vody and PepsiCo agreed to acquire the company from Mid Europa Partners for undisclosed amount.
