= Regina Maria Health Network =

Private healthcare service in Romania

The Regina Maria Health Network is a private healthcare service in Romania founded in 1995. It is owned by Mid Europa Partners who put it up for sale in 2019 valued at more than €300 million, with reported annual revenues of around €150 million and an operating profit of €25 million.

It owns the Regina Maria Hospital in Cluj-Napoca which opened in 2019.

It is the second largest network on the Romanian private healthcare market with more than 6,000 employees and collaborators in 64 medical centers in the country. It has an active programme of taking over clinics and laboratories.

Wargha Enayati, a cardiologist founded the business. He says he is focussed on elderly care, a neglected area in Romania.
