= Mlekara Subotica =

Serbian dairy products company

- Native name: Млекара Суботица
- Company type: Joint-stock company
- Industry: Food and drink, Dairy produce
- Founded: 4 March 1955
- Defunct: February 2015
- Fate: Closed and merged into Imlek
- Successor: Imlek
- Headquarters: Subotica, Serbia
- Products: butter, cheese, kajmak/vrhnje, milk, powdered milk, pudding, yogurts
- Owner: Mid Europa Partners (100%)
- Website: www.mlekara.rs

Mlekara Subotica (Serbian: Млекара Суботица) was a Serbian producer of dairy products based in Subotica, Serbia.

It was one of the largest and most modern dairy manufacture companies in Serbia. As of 2012, Mlekara Subotica produced around 16 million litres of fresh milk and 5 million litres yogurt annually. Other dairy products include cheese, kajmak/vrhnje, powdered milk, pudding and butter.

It exported its products to the countries in the region as well as in the European Union, with 50 tons of dairy products a month.

== History ==
=== The establishment (1955–1965) ===
AD Mlekara Subotica was founded on 4 March 1955 in Subotica under the name "Co – operative Dairy - Independent Business Organization ". In 1957, Mlekara Subotica purchased its first used trucks, a batch pasteurizer with ribbed cooler and a separator pasteurizer. At that time, the first chemical analyses of milk quality, regarding acidity analyses and the assessment of milk fat content were made. In May 1959 "Co- operative Dairy" became Mlekara Subotica. In 1963, instead of milk churns, glass packaging for milk and yogurt were introduced. In 1968, Mlekara Subotica is awarded with a Yugoslav Oscar for packaging, more precisely for plastic cup packaging for sour cream. New, so called “Dutch tanks” for the production of cheese were purchased. In 1972, Mlekara Subotica had moved to a new location. It meant better working conditions and a significant increase in the number of employees involving their better qualification structure.

=== The modernization (1966–1975) ===
The period of 1966 and onwards is the age of modernization. Mlekara Subotica was equipped with a roller-type milk drying installation. New vehicles were bought, as well as a fuel oil driven steam boiler and a number of milk cooling devices. In 1975, a new, 100.000 liters per day capacity spray drier was put into operation. At that time, the production program of Mlekara Subotica consisted of: Sonja pasteurized milk, fermented milk drinks, cheeses, butter and powder milk.

=== The expansion (1976–1995) ===
In 1978, Mlekara purchased a combined installation and another spray drier for processing milk, fruit and vegetables, thus ensuring safety in supplying final consumers with dairy product, as well as its buyers - companies from the confectionery industry and bakeries, as well as fodder producers. The development of the new powder milk production facility was finished. Another roller was bought for drying milk for powder milk, as well as a two-stage evaporation plant, a compressor, then a new "freezing” water line, a brand new vehicles and a whole range of minor investments was implemented. In 1985, Mlekara Subotica celebrated three decades of successful and continuous growth of operations. The company processed over 56 million raw milk and other dairy products, and had 265 employees. Mlekara Subotica had grown into one of the biggest dairy companies in Yugoslavia, at the same time occupying a significant market share in the processing industry group on the level of the country.

The period between 1986 and 1995 was marked by the building of the cheese plant, where quark and soft white cheese were produced. Mlekara Subotica introduced the technology of creamy cheese spreads. The production of instant powder products started in 1989. Mlekara Subotica opened a representative office and a shop in Belgrade, and started the cooperation with C-Market. At the same time, another representative office and a shop were opened in Ćuprija together with the company Firma Pomoravlje, as well as the company's own branch office and shop in Niš. Major investments in new machines “tetra rex” and “elopak”, provided eco-friendly paper packaging of short shelf-life liquid products. The investment in the Aseptic A3 sterilizing line, in the amount of about 2 million Swiss Francs enabled tetra-pak packaging of aseptic milk, chocolate milk and juices, and it provided a more serious presence in the center of former Yugoslavia, since product shelf-life was prolonged. Significant funds were invested in primary production. In this period, about 1.800 calf heifers, 400 milking machines and about 100 cooling devices were purchased. In 1995, Mlekara Subotica welcomes the fourth decade completely solvent and free from any debt, with investments financed solely from the company's own funds.

=== Further developments (1996–2005) ===
The activities of Mlekara Subotica were categorized by the trend of growth in the field of raw milk receptions and in technical –technological and marketing areas. From a simple co – operative dairy Mlekara Subotica has successfully managed to develop into a factory, which can today be measured by the European standards. Mlekara Subotica had processed more than 1.3 billion liters of milk. The quantities processed today are one hundred times more than at the very beginning! During 2003, the full automation of the fermented dairy product plant was finished, and it consisted of new equipment for milk standardization, milk and fermented cream pasteurization and homogenization, fermented dairy product production (yogurt, fermented milk, fermented cream, new probiotic and low-calorie drinks). Together with the British Salford Investment Fund, which is the majority owner of Mlekara Subotica from November 2003, the investments into new technologies were continued. In the same year, the buy-up of about 60 million liters of milk were planned, hence the emphasis was given to the development of family farms. At present, there are 72 family farms owned by Mlekara Subotica, and by the end of the year another 30 farms will be developed, where milk production can be measured by European standards. These efforts will ensure extra quality raw milk. The laboratory equipped for microbiological and chemical control and for the control of the cows’ health safety has started to work recently. This lab is an additional link in the chain of internal quality control. In 2005, Mlekara was certificated to ISO 9001:2000. The HACCP system for controlled production has also been introduced in the company, and it will enable export to EU countries and the countries of the region.

=== Modernization (2006–2015) ===
The implementation of the quality management standard initiated several strategically significant technical-technological and constructional investments. In 2008, the application area of BRC Standard was extended to the full production range, while in the year 2009 HALAL standard has also been implemented which defines the conditions for food producers and so could be exported in the countries with mostly Muslim population. Thanks to the intensive joint work with the Veterinary Administration, the positive assessment by the European Commission, Mlekara Subotica was on the list. The Commission's decision was a confirmation of quality and the safety of products, which results in a 30 million euro investment of Danube Foods Group in all aspects of business since it became the majority owner in 2003. In 2010, Mlekara Subotica adapted and improved its operations according to modern concepts of environmental protection and introduced the environmental management system ISO 14001:2004. The entire system of production and business was brought to the required level when the control of the EU commission was announced in the first quarter of 2010, thus confirmed the decision of the Veterinary Inspection of Serbia which approved the export of products of Mlekara Subotica to the EU. In 2011 was brought another standard to Mlekara Subotica called IFS V5, which improved the food safety and product quality, as well as should be increase security and confidence of consumers and among all improve cost efficiency in the food chain.

=== Shutdown and merging with Imlek ===
In February 2015, the investment fund Mid Europa Partners bought "Danube Foods Group" (which at the time owned Mlekara Subotica) for a sum of 575 million euros. Later, Mlekara Subotica was merged into the Serbian largest dairy products company Imlek, thus way ceasing company's operations; company's facilities in Subotica have since been used by Imlek.
