= Imlek =

Imlek may refer to:

- Imlek, the Indonesian name for the Chinese (Lunar) New Year, from the Hokkien word for "lunar calendar" (Chinese: 陰曆; Pe̍h-ōe-jī: im-le̍k).
- Imlek a.d., a Serbian food company.
