= Layered, Inc. =

Boston Macintosh accounting software company acquired by Peachtree Software in 1990

- Type: Private
- Industry: Software
- Founders: Stephen Burakoff; Eric Levine
- Fate: Acquired by Peachtree Software
- Headquarters: Boston, Massachusetts, United States
- Key people: William Savoy, President
- Products: atOnce!
- Number of employees: 31 (1990)

Layered, Inc., was an American software company based in Boston, Massachusetts. The company was founded in 1983 and chiefly developed for Apple's Macintosh computer. At the time of its acquisition in 1990 by Peachtree Software, of Norcross, Georgia, Layered was considered the market leader in accounting software for the Mac, with InfoWorld calling Layered "the Rolls-Royce of Macintosh accounting software". It marketed the Insight Expert Accounting family of software in 1985 and atOnce! in 1989, the latter rebranded as Peachtree Accounting for Macintosh after the company's acquisition.
