= Plazma (biscuit) =

Brand of soft biscuits

- Product type: Biscuit
- Current owner: Bambi A.D.
- Produced by: Bambi A.D.
- Country: Serbia
- Introduced: 1967; 59 years ago
- Markets: South Europe
- Previous owners: Coca-Cola HBC Serbia
- Tagline: All you need (Serbian: Све што ти треба)
- Website: www.plazma.rs

Plazma (Serbian Cyrillic: Плазма) (/Plazma/) is a brand of soft biscuits owned by Bambi A.D. It was introduced in 1967 in Serbia as a cheaper and more widely available alternative to Plasmon, or a direct competitor to Petit Beurre made by Kraš. (Note: "Plazma keks, istorija njegovog nastanka će vas zaprepastiti", Dnevno.rs (2014), cited in "Istorija Bambijevog Plazma keksa", Edukacija.rs (2015)) (Note: "Petar Tutavac, covek koji je napravio Plazma keks", RTV Biser (2020)) It is also known as Lane in Western Europe and the Americas since the 1990s.

== History ==
Following the acquisition of the Italian-based Plasmon Society by Heinz in 1963, mass layoffs occurred at the factories which operated at the time, with one of the workers laid-off, Petar Tutavac (1934–2022), deciding to return to his home in the city of Požarevac, setting in motion the foundation of the Serbian food company Bambi a.d. and the creation of its popular Plazma biscuits in 1967 and 1968 respectively, sold as Lane biscuits outside of former Yugoslavia to avoid further litigation from Heinz.

This origin story however has been disputed by Bambi's founder, Momčilo Filipović, who explained in an interview how Plazma's creation stemmed from his ambition to expand Leskovac’s wheat mill into biscuit production, an idea which was not met with much enthusiasm by the city, which wanted to develop its more traditional textiles industry instead. After acquiring the rights and technology from Italian producers after lengthy negotiations, Bambi was set up in Požarevac, and Tutovac, in actuality a master-baker from a small biscuit factory in Croatia, was brought on board, only to rise up to become the technical director.

== Varieties ==
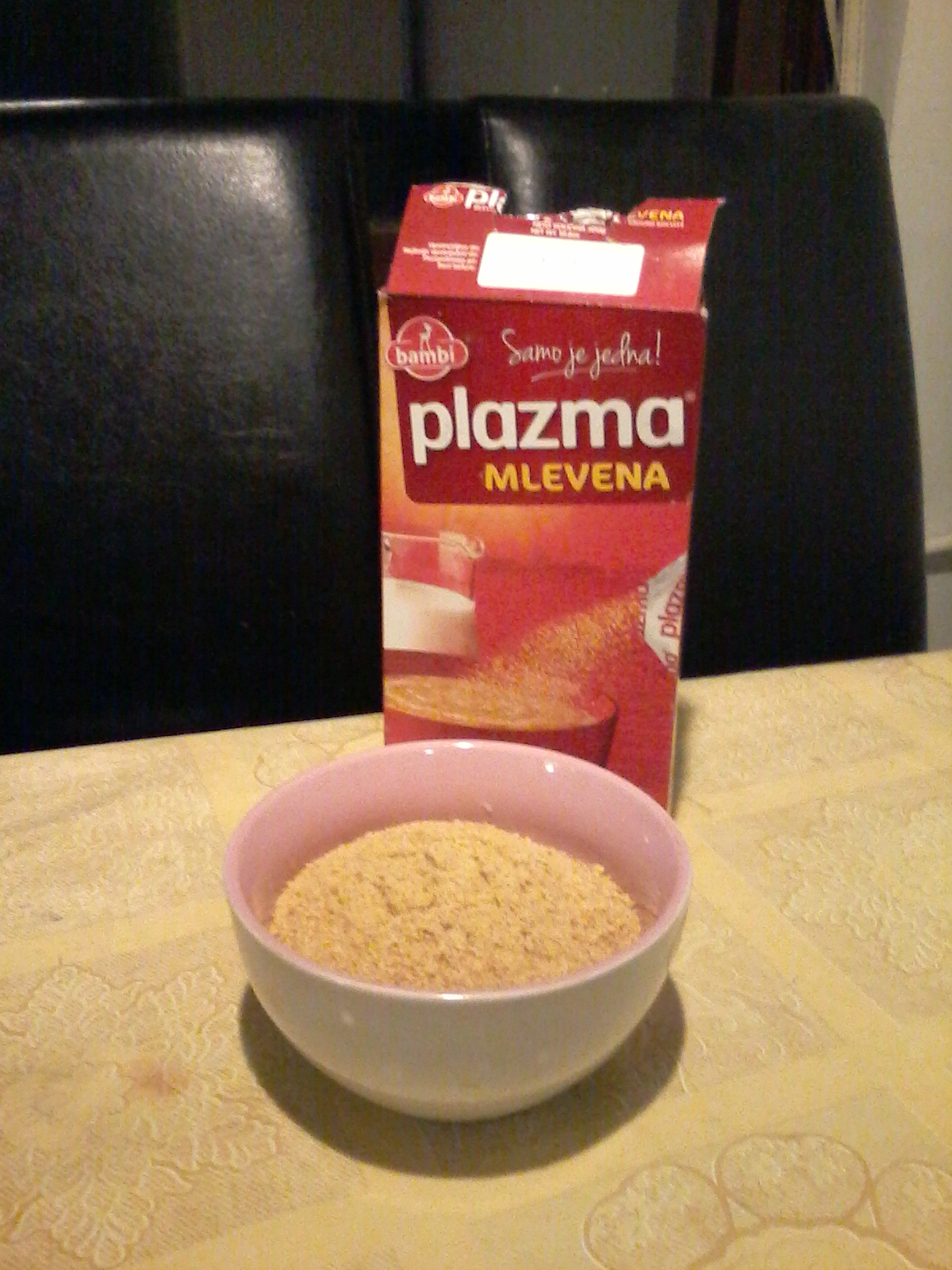
An image of Plazma Mlevena

There have been in total 21 Plazma varieties, of which 10 have been discontinued. (Note: Plazma's official website) (Note: Plazma's official website throughout the years (wayback machine). Bambi removed most of their less popular/discontinued products from the official website.)

Plazma Varieties
| Name | Description | Year of release | Discontinued? |
|---|---|---|---|
| Plazma Mlevena | Ground biscuit variety of Plazma | 1998 | No |
| Čoko Plazma | Smaller Plazma half-coated in chocolate. Merged into Plazma Plus in 2018. | 2008 | Yes |
| Plazma Dobar Start | Plazma cereal with chunks of dried fruit, advertised as a replacement for breakfast | 2009 | Yes |
| Plazma Keksići | Small animal-shaped Plazma. Advertised towards children. Comes in chocolate and plain variety. | 2010 | Yes |
| Plazma Posna | Plazma Posna (Note: Post (Fasting) is a form of fasting in Orthodox Christianity in which most non-vegan food is avoided, except for fish and honey, as well as oil. Posno foods accommodate that.) is Plazma which keeps the same taste without non-posno ingredients. | 2011 | No |
| Plazma Diet | Plazma with no sugar added | 2012 | No |
| Plazma XXL | Plazma XXL is a singular, longer Plazma biscuit half-coated in chocolate | 2013 | No |
| Plazma 2 Go | Smaller Plazma with no alternate varieties. Replaced with Plazma Mini in 2015. | 2013 | Yes |
| Plazma Uživancija | A smaller pack of Plazma that contained 6 biscuits | 2013 | Yes |
| Plazma Milky Sandwich | Plazma Milky Sandwich is a sandwich-style cookie with milk in-between two Plazma cookies. It was created to mimic the widely popular way of eating Plazma with milk. (Note: Due to its dry nature, it is widely popular to eat Plazma with milk) | 2014 | Yes |
| Plazma Shake&Go | Plazma Shake&Go is an instant drink powder, that when combined with water would make a milkshake that tastes like Plazma and milk. It was created to mimic the widely popular way of eating Plazma with milk. | 2014 | Yes |
| Plazma Plus (2014-2018) | Plazma with added hazelnuts and grains. Merged with Čoko Plazma in 2018 to create the new Plazma Plus. | 2014 | Yes |
| Plazma Mini | Plazma Mini is smaller Plazma, available as plain or Apricot with Yogurt. | 2015 | Yes |
| Plazma Mini Mini | Bite-sized Plazma with 3 alternative flavors: Chocolate, Banana, Strawberry-Milkshake, Tutti-frutti and the later discontinued Peanut. | 2016 | No |
| Plazma Slana | Plazma Slana is a Plazma biscuit with less sugar and increased salt, making it taste more like a cracker. It comes in 2 varieties: Regular and Cheese. It is advertised as a quick snack when you don't have the time to prepare a full meal. | 2017 | No |
| Plazma Plus | Plazma Plus is smaller Plazma with increased flavor. It debuted with 3 varieties: Chocolate, Cappuccino, and Hazelnut. Caramel and Apricot with Yogurt would come afterwards. | 2018 | No |
| Plazma Kids | Small Plazma biscuits shaped like Paw Patrol characters, commonly advertised towards young children. | 2018 | Yes |
| Plazma Kocka | Wafer with ground Plazma cream and walnuts, coated in chocolate and more walnuts | 2018 | No |
| Plazma Sticks | Plazma Sticks is a Plazma biscuit, in the shape of a stick, coated in chocolate, walnuts, and ground Plazma | 2020 | No |
| PlazMix | PlazMix is Plazma chunks with raspberries/hazelnuts and dark chocolate. It is meant to be eaten as a cereal (mixed with milk) and is advertised as a replacement for breakfast. | 2021 | No |
| Zimska Plazma | A wintery version of Plazma that has a taste of vanilla and cinnamon. There is a chocolate variant. | 2023 | No |
| Plazma Od Srca | Chocolate-covered Plazma heart treats. There are 2 flavors: Hazelnut and Orange. It is one of Plazma's latest inventions. | 2023 | No |
| Plazma Kockica | Chocolate-covered Plazma cubes, in both Original and White. Along with Plazma Od Srca, it has been recently introduced. This product is only available on markets called iDEA, Roda, and Merkator. | 2023 | No |
| Plazma rolsi | Crispy wafer rolls filled with creamy fillings, in hazelnut-cocoa, hazelnut and coconut. This product is available on Aman and Univerexport. | 2026 | No |
