= Sage 50 =

Accountancy and payroll software

- Developer: Sage Group
- Stable release: 2025
- Operating system: Microsoft Windows
- Type: Accounting software; Payroll
- License: Proprietary
- Website: www.sage.com

Sage 50 is a set of accountancy and payroll products developed by Sage Group aimed at small and medium enterprises. Sage offers unrelated products under the Sage 50 name in different regions. The product name originally derives from the UK and Ireland version of the product, where the number 50 indicated that it was aimed at companies with up to 50 employees. The products are described as cloud-connected, reflecting the remote working and online capabilities of the range.

As of 2025, some of the Sage 50 products, including the UK and Ireland version, include AI-integrated features, branded as Sage Copilot.

== UK and Ireland version ==
In the UK and Ireland, there are four products under the Sage 50 banner: Accounts, Payroll, HR and P11D. Sage 50 Accounts was the market-leading accounting solution for many years.

Sage 50 Accounts has its origins in some of the earliest Sage products. A direct relative of the current product is the Sage Sterling range, which became available in September 1989 as a replacement for Sage's Businesswise Accounts range. Sage Sterling was initially available for DOS, and later for Microsoft Windows in the early 1990s. The product was re-branded as Sage Sterling +2, and in 1993, a version of the product became available for Apple Macintosh. By 1993, Sage Sterling was the market leader, with 62.5% of the integrated accounting software market. In the late 1990s, Sage Instant – a cut-down version of the product line – was introduced.

Later, the product was rebranded as Sage Line 50, a reference to its target market, and in the 2000s, it was rebranded to Sage 50. In the 2010s, cloud-connected functionality was added to the product line, and the 50c and 50cloud names began to be used as part of the wider Sage Business Cloud portfolio of products. In 2023, the product branding was simplified again to Sage 50. The UK/Ireland Sage 50 products are developed in Newcastle upon Tyne, England.

Two related products, Sage 50 Manufacturing and Sage 50 Jobcosting, ceased to be updated and supported in 2021.

== US version ==
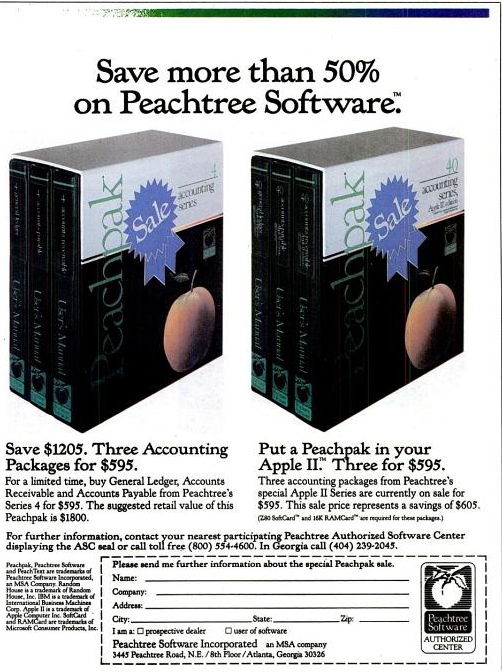
Peachtree Software advertisement in the November 29, 1982, issue of InfoWorld

The US version of the product was previously called Peachtree Accounting. A conversion to the Peachtree/Sage 50 data format was made available when Simply Accounting was discontinued. In 2013, it was rebranded under the Sage 50 banner.

Peachtree Accounting was originally sold by Peachtree Software, a software publisher founded in Atlanta in 1978 by Ben Dyer, Ron Roberts, Steve Mann, and John Hayes. The company was carved out of The Computer System Center, an early Altair dealer founded by Roberts, Mann, Jim Dunion, and Rich Stafford, which Dyer had joined as manager, and where its first software was published in 1977. Peachtree was the first successful business software made for microcomputers, supplanting the General Ledger programmed with CBASIC and distributed by Structured Systems Group. It is the oldest microcomputer program for business in current use. The company expanded its offerings with the acquisition of Layered, an accounting program designed for use on the Macintosh. The company's products were included in the initial launch of the IBM Personal Computer, and it was acquired by Management Science America (MSA) in June 1981.

By early 1984, InfoWorld estimated that Peachtree was the world's seventh-largest microcomputer-software company, with $21.7 million in 1983 sales. Intelligent Systems Corporation bought Peachtree from MSA, reportedly for $1 million, in 1985; the unit had $20 million in sales but was losing money. Peachtree had sales of $3 million in 1986 and $10 million in 1987, and returned to profitability, but Intelligent Systems sold Peachtree in a management buyout in 1988 for $20 million to fund other subsidiaries. Later owned by ADP, Inc., Peachtree was eventually acquired by the Sage Group in 1998 for US$145 million.

In the US, many schools incorporate this program into their Accounting classes.

A 1990 American Institute of Certified Public Accountants (AICPA) member survey found that 8% used Peachtree for client write-up. While second only to Write-up Solution (11%) and slightly ahead of AMI Datawrite (8%), 16% of its users said they would not recommend Peachtree, compared to 1% for Creative Solutions and 4% for AMI Datawrite. 4% used Peachtree for fixed assets/depreciation, with 20% saying they would not recommend it.

17% of AICPA respondents had Peachtree installed. While the most among general-accounting software—ahead of 12% for MAS 90/Evolution and 8% for ACCPAC—11% of users would not recommend Peachtree, compared to 2% for MAS 90/Evolution and 3% for ACCPAC.

== Canadian version ==
The Canadian version of Sage 50 was previously known as Bedford Accounting and later renamed to Simply Accounting. In 2013, it was brought under the Sage 50 banner.

Bedford Software released Bedford Integrated Accounting for MS-DOS in 1985 and for Macintosh in 1988. Bedford Software was acquired by Computer Associates in 1989. Simply Accounting became an Independent Business Unit of Computer Associates in 1996 and subsequently incorporated as ACCPAC International, Inc. in 1998. ACCPAC was acquired by The Sage Group in 2004 for integration with its ERP products. It is developed in Richmond, British Columbia.

== French version ==
The French version of the product, known as Sage 50 Ciel, was initially developed by Ciel, a French software company founded in 1986, that Sage acquired in 1992.

== German/Austrian version ==
The Austrian and German versions of the product were formerly known as Sage GS-Office. It came under the Sage 50 banner in 2015.

== Polish version ==
The Polish version of the product was known as Sage Symfonia 50 until it was acquired by Mid Europa Partners in 2021 and rebranded as Symfonia.

== Spanish version ==
The Spanish version of the product was formerly known as Sage ContaPlus. First offered in the early 1980s by Grupo SP, it gained popularity in 1990 by utilising newsstands as a point of sale and was offered at low prices, a time when professional accounting services were expensive. ContaPlus also took advantage of the Spanish accounting reform of 1990. Nowadays, ContaPlus is the "accounting standard" in Spain, with more than one million customers. Grupo SP was acquired by Sage in 2003.

== South African version ==
The South African version, Sage 50 Pastel, was formerly known as Pastel Accounting and has been available since 1989. The product was initially developed by Pastel Software, which was acquired by Softline in 1999. Following the acquisition, the product became known as Softline Pastel. In 2003, Sage acquired Softline, and the product eventually became known as Sage Pastel, and later renamed as Sage 50 Pastel. It is widely used in the industry, with job advertisements frequently requiring proficiency in the software, and training courses are available from third-party providers.

== See also ==
- DacEasy
