= DacEasy =

Defunct American software company

DacEasy, Inc.
- Formerly: Dac Software, Inc.
- Company type: Private
- Industry: Software
- Founded: 1985; 40 years ago in Dallas, Texas, United States
- Founder: Kevin Howe; Jose Hurtado; Leopoldo Hurtado
- Defunct: 2000; 25 years ago
- Fate: Acquired by Insilco Corporation in 1987, made subsidiary; sold to Sage Software in 1991, absorbed into Sage in 2000
- Number of employees: 280 (1994, peak)

DacEasy, Inc., originally Dac Software, Inc., was an American developer and publisher of productivity and accounting software active from 1985 to 2000 and based in Dallas, Texas. They were best known for their namesake DacEasy suite of accounting software for the IBM Personal Computer and IBM PC compatibles. The DacEasy software was launched in April 1985 as the least expensive integrated accounting software package on the market, at under US$50. At the time, all others on the market were at least several hundred US dollars per module.

In 1987, the DacEasy company was acquired by Insilco Corporation, a conglomerate based in Connecticut, who kept DacEasy around as an independently run subsidiary. In 1991, Insilco sold DacEasy to Sage Software (later known as the Sage Group) of the United Kingdom. Like Insilco, Sage kept DacEasy around as a subsidiary, until 1999. Sage continued to develop an accounting package with the DacEasy name until 2019.

== History ==
DacEasy, Inc., was founded as Dac Software, Inc., in 1985 by Kevin Howe, Jose Hurtado, Leopoldo Hurtado (Jose's brother), and two of Jose's brothers-in-law, in Dallas, Texas. Howe was DacEasy's president and principal founder; before starting DacEasy, Howe (an Oklahoma native) graduated from Northwestern Oklahoma State University with a bachelor's degree in speech and economics and from Southern Methodist University with an MBA. After university, Howe worked at Taylor Publishing, a maker of high school yearbooks that was then a subsidiary of the Insilco Corporation of Meriden, Connecticut, where he was vice president of new product development. Meanwhile, Hurtado was a Mexico-born Certified Public Accountant and computer programmer working in the United States who had befriended Howe while consulting for Taylor Publishing. The company's six founders incorporated Dac's original headquarters in a 163,000-square-foot office park in Dallas, of which they occupied 35,000-square-foot of space.

Dac Software launched their eponymous flagship product, DacEasy, a suite of accounting software for the IBM Personal Computer and compatibles, in April 1985. DacEasy integrated several major aspects of accounting software which, in previously released titles from other companies, previously spanned multiple separate packages, which customers had to buy separately. These aspects included modules for accounts payable, accounts receivable, billing, a double-entry general ledger, inventory, purchase orders, and financial forecasting. DacEasy, which was written almost entirely by Hurtado in compiled BASIC, integrated these functions into one 5.25-inch floppy disk. It was very well received by critics and users, not least of which for value proposition and low cost (US$49.95 originally, later increased to $69.95). The market for accounting software was crowded at the time, one estimate placing the number of software firms offering such software at over 400. DacEasy was able to compete by selling for a double-digit price point, whereas other companies sold their accounting software packages for between $1,500 and $3,000 combined (for equivalent functionality). Sales of DacEasy grew exponentially, the company selling roughly 4,000 copies a month between April and July 1985 and 18,000 in the month of August alone. By October 1985, it topped the charts for personal computer accounting software. Dac Software supported their customers with an annual $50 service contract for phone inquiries topping 60 minutes.

Soon after the release of DacEasy, Howe began diversifying Dac Software's catalog. In November 1985, they introduced Easy Word, a word processor for the IBM PC and compatibles that included a built-in English dictionary of 70,000 words for spellchecking and functionality for mail merging, auto-hyphenation, and justification. EasyWord faced an even more crowded market and was met with lukewarm enthusiasm from the press. In June 1987, by which point they had sold 170,000 copies of the first version of DacEasy and earned over $3.7 million in sales since their founding, Dac Software released DacEasy version 2.0. DacEasy 2.0 was rewritten from the ground up in C and spanned two floppy installation disks. Version 2.0 retained the same modules as the first version while adding online help, a better text-based windowing system with more coherent menus, pop-up windows, and user-definable color themes, more standardized key shortcuts, and better-worded error messages, among other improvements. Dac Software sold separately an add-on pack allowing users to tabulate payroll, for $49.95. In late 1987, the company released a stripped-down version of DacEasy, called DacEasy Light, aimed at smaller businesses and novices to accounting. DacEasy Light lacks the inventory, forecasting, and purchase order modules of the mainstream package and limits the number of transactions per month to no more than 2,200 and the number of checks between reconciliations to no more than 800. DacEasy Light sold over 20,000 copies within six months.

In November 1987, Dac Software was acquired by Howe's former employer Insilco Corporation for roughly $35 million. Insilco Corporation was an investment firm who up to that point owned 12 other companies in a wide range of fields, including the aforementioned Taylor Publishing, Rolodex, Red Devil, and the International Silverware Company (a silverware company and their former namesake). The acquisition of Dac Software, which was Insilco's first computer-related acquisition, was one of the largest acquisitions of a software company up to that point. Dac Software had sold 300,000 copies of their mainstream DacEasy package by the time they were acquired.

Dac remained an independently run subsidiary of Insilco out of Dallas. Insilco's ownership of Dac was initially beneficial for both companies at first, but tensions started to manifest after a couple of years. Hurtado left the company to found M-USA Business Systems, Inc. (M-USA short for Mexico-U.S.A.), a rival developer of accounting software. In February 1989, Dac Software acquired the rights to publish Lucid 3-D, an early multisheet (so called three-dimensional, although not in the modern sense) spreadsheet application developed by the Personal Computer Support Group of Dallas. Dac released version 2.0 of Lucid 3-D later in the year. In late 1989, Dac began developing DacEasy for Apple's Macintosh computer; however, plans to develop DacEasy for Microsoft's Windows operating system were scrapped by order of Insilco. In December 1990, Dac rush-released DacEasy version 4.0, in time for Christmas. A number of bugs were found with its number-crunching engine, leading to a recall the following month. Also in January 1991, Insilco filed for Chapter 11 bankruptcy and began selling off its assets, including Dac Software. According to Howe, Insilco slated to sell Dac to a group of Texas oil barons, before Sage Software of the United Kingdom counter-offered with a US$18 million purchase offer. The sale to Sage Group (later known as the Sage Group) was finalized in May 1991. Dac Software changed their name to DacEasy, Inc., adopting the name of their namesake product while continuing to operate as a subsidiary of Sage for several years. The company grew to 280 employees in 1994 before shrinking to 230 in 1995. DacEasy the company dissolved in around 2000, when DacEasy's website was replaced with that of Sage's own. Sage continued to offer an accounting suite by the name of Sage DacEasy until 2019.

== See also ==
- Peachtree Software
