= Softline (South African software company) =

- Former Softline Pastel product logo.
- Type: Subsidiary
- Industry: Software
- Founded: 1988
- Founders: Ivan Epstein; Alan Osrin
- Defunct: 2003 (indirectly)
- Fate: Now operates as a division of Sage
- Successor: Sage South Africa
- Headquarters: Johannesburg, South Africa
- Products: Accounting and Payroll products
- Parent: Sage Group
- Website: www.sage.com/en-za/

Softline was a South African enterprise software company that existed as an independent company between 1988 and 2003 when it was acquired by the UK-based multinational corporation The Sage Group plc. Sage continued to use Softline as a brand name until 2013 when all of Softline's products were re-branded as Sage.

Sage's South African business continues to provide Sage's global products as well as local South African solutions that cover accounting, ERP, Payroll and HR, Business Intelligence, customer relationship management and retail software solutions to small, medium and larger sized companies in South Africa.

== History ==
Softline was founded by Ivan Epstein and Alan Osrin in 1988 during the formative years of the software industry with a mere R1,500 loan. The two founding members of Softline were soon joined by local entrepreneur Steven Cohen in 1990.

By 1993, more than 20,000 South African businesses were utilising Softline's Brilliant Accounting products aimed primarily at medium-sized enterprises. In 1994, Ivan Epstein secured a long-term agreement with Intuit, granting Softline exclusive distribution rights to the Intuit range of products in Southern Africa; Intuit acquired the South African business back from Softline in 2006.

Softline experienced growth during the 1990s and by 1995 began to actively pursue the implementation of Softline's listing in the Johannesburg Stock Exchange. During this time, Softline's reseller base extended into Africa. On 19 February 1997, Softline Limited listed on the Johannesburg Stock Exchange with a market capitalization of R250m (£20m).

In October 1997, the black empowerment group Hosken Consolidated Investments (HCI) acquired 20% interest in Softline. In a back-to-back transaction, Softline acquired 60% of US-based SVI Holdings Inc., for R150 million. This transaction marked Softline's entry into international markets. At this time, SVI had operations based in the US and Australia. SVI Holdings Inc. had previously acquired Divergent Technologies Pty Ltd Propriety Limited in Sydney, Australia in October 1996, Applied Retail Solutions in San Diego, California to enter the point of sale market in the USA in July 1998 and Island Pacific Systems in Irvine, California, a leading retail applications' software group in the USA candour in July 1999. In July 1998, SVI transferred its listing to the American Stock Exchange (AMEX:SVI).

=== Sale to Sage ===
In 2003, Softline was delisted from the Johannesburg Stock Exchange to be acquired by The Sage Group plc, one of the leading providers of business management software and services to SME's.

In 1989, Alan Ware and Jeremy Waterman established LA Technology, the distributor for Accpac International throughout sub-Saharan Africa. LA Technology was later acquired by Accpac International in 2000 and became known as ACCPAC Africa. In 2004, ACCPAC Africa was acquired by the Sage Group plc from Computer Associates and was renamed Softline Accpac.

In May 2010, Softline announced the acquisition of Netcash (Pty) Ltd, a company that provides transaction processing services that was founded in 2002. Softline integrated Netcash into their accounting and payroll products. In 2013, Netcash was rebranded as Sage Pay before being sold in a management buyout and again becoming Netcash in 2019.

In 2013 Sage embarked on a programme of uniforming their product names and offerings and moved away from using the Softline brand name, branding the former Softline products as Sage.

== Acquisitions ==
Softline's acquisitions included:

| Date | Acquisition |
|---|---|
| November 1996 | Softline Limited acquires 100% of Ultra Technologies |
| November 1996 | Softline Limited acquires 100% of MasterSkill Training |
| May 1997 | Softline Limited acquires 100% of Multisoft SA |
| August 1997 | Softline Limited acquires 100% of IBIS Services. This was Softline Limited's first off-shore acquisition. IBIS Services, based in the United Kingdom, a developer and distributor of accounting software specifically for the Construction and Plant Hire industries. |
| August 1997 | Softline Limited acquires 100% of ISU Campus |
| April 1998 | Softline acquired VIP Payroll Systems one of South Africa's largest payroll developers and implementers |
| May 1998 | Softline increased the group's presence in the accounting software market through the acquisition of Lorge & Associates |
| July 1998 | Softline Limited acquired Sybiz Software in Adelaide Australia for A$10m. Sybiz was later sold in 2005 in a management buyout. |
| November 1998 | Softline moved into the hospitality Point-Of Sale with the Acquisition of 100% of Pilot Software |
| January 1999 | Softline enters USA market directly via the 100% acquisition of Datafaction |
| January 1999 | Softline Limited acquires major competitor Pastel Software - A significant milestone in the history of Softline was the acquisition of Pastel Software. This acquisition consolidated Softline's position as the largest accounting software vendor in southern Africa (with an estimated 80% market share) and then the second largest in Australia. |
| April 1999 | Softline acquires 100% of Opensoft a developer of e-commerce applications |
| August 1999 | Softline acquires 100% of Handisoft, a leading provider of taxation and practice management software and furthers its presence in Australia |
| November 1999 | Softline acquires 100% of ATS, an Accpac solution provider to strengthen its skills in the mid-range accounting software space |
| April 2000 | Softline established its footprint in Canada through the 100% acquisition of Businessvision in Toronto |
| November 2000 | Softline furthers its presence in the United States through the 100% acquisition of Accountmate, a developer of midrange accounting software based in California |

== Products ==
Sage South Africa provide Sage's global products as well as local software including:

- Softline Enterprise
- Softline Accpac is a full service enterprise management software package that can be used across industries.
- Pastel Accounting, now known as Sage 50, is an accounting software package that is used by over 200,000 companies in 52 countries across the globe.
- Pastel Payroll is online payroll software product developed by Softline.
- Softline VIP is a Payroll and HR software system for small, medium and large corporations.
- Sage ERP Africa
- Sage Alchemex
