= Lucid 3-D =

Lucid 3-D was a spreadsheet package that began in the MS-DOS era; Windows support came later.

== History ==
Sam Redman and Michael Stanford incorporated as PCSG corporation (Portable Computer Support Group).

Their Lucid 3-D spreadsheet was marketed by Dac Software of Dallas, Texas.

== Features ==
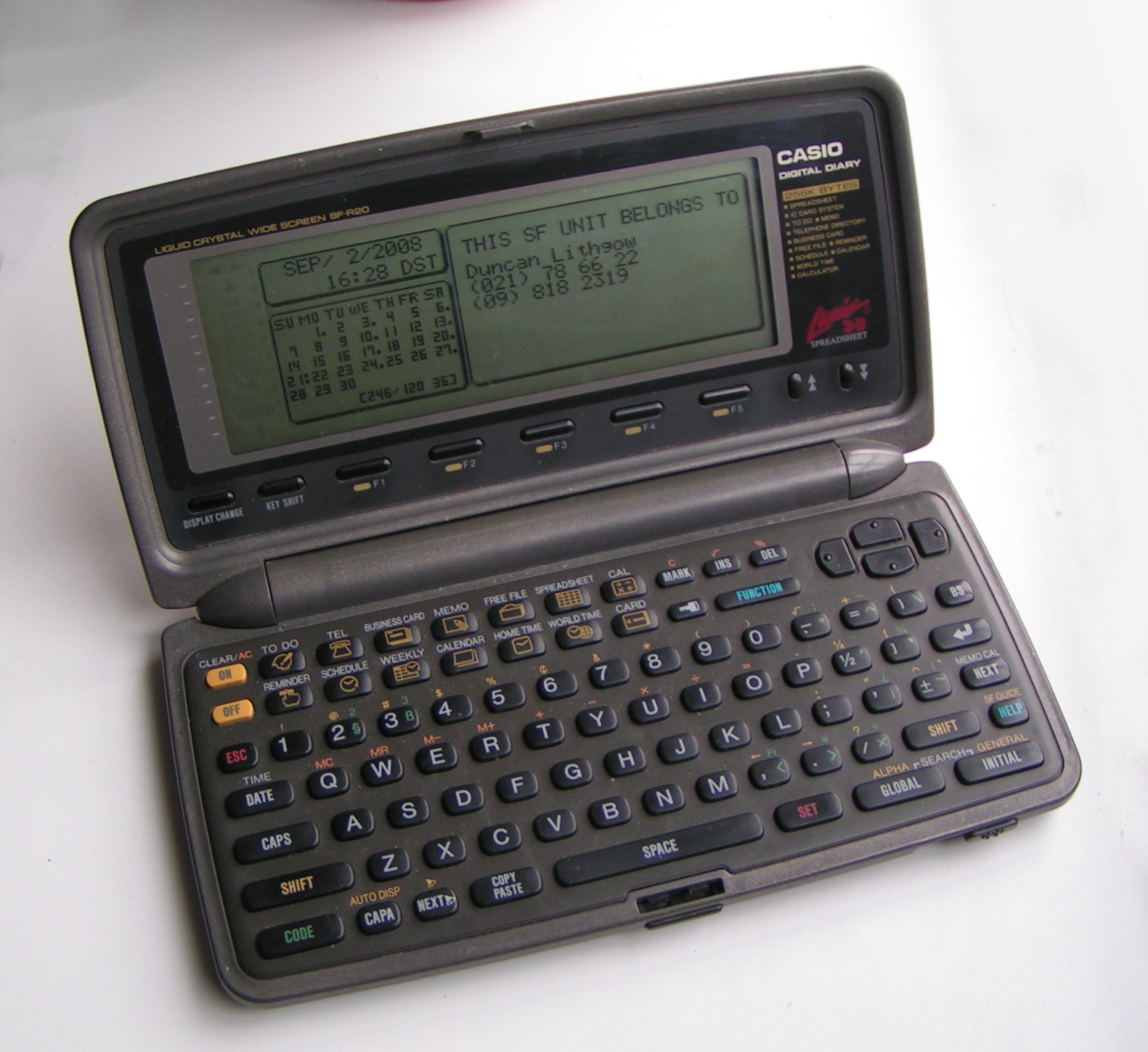
Casio SF-R20 personal organizer with Lucid-3D built-in, with a printed logo of the program. (Lucid-3D not displayed)

Lucid 3-D was considered noteworthy at the time for being "the only major memory-resident spreadsheet available for the PC".

The selling point of the product was being "three dimensional. Any cell of the spreadsheet can contain a complete other spreadsheet that you can access with a single keystroke."

Another technical feature was what their ads called "not only minimal recalc, but background recalc".

Lucid 3-D was included in advanced personal organizers, such as in Casio SF-R20.

The Windows versions could display "up to nine overlapping spreadsheet windows".

=== File extension ===
Data files were stored using the extension ".lcw" (Dot LCW).
