= Imlek a.d. =

Serbian food company based in Belgrade

Imlek
- Native name: Имлек
- Company type: Joint-stock company
- Industry: Branded food, Food and drink, Dairy produce
- Founded: 12 March 1991; 35 years ago (Current form); 1953; 73 years ago (Founded)
- Headquarters: Industrijsko naselje bb, Padinska skela, Belgrade, Serbia
- Area served: Serbia; Bosnia and Herzegovina; Croatia; Montenegro; North Macedonia
- Key people: Bojan Radun (Director)
- Products: butter, cheese, milk, yogurts, juice
- Revenue: ▼€325.17 million (2018)
- Net income: ▼€30.59 million (2018)
- Total assets: ▼€399.33 million (2018)
- Total equity: ▲€53.87 million (2018)
- Owner: Mid Europa Partners
- Number of employees: 2,274 (2018)
- Subsidiaries: Subsidiaries
- Website: www.imlek.rs/en

Imlek a.d. (full legal name: Akcionarsko društvo Industrija mleka i mlečnih proizvoda Imlek Padinska Skela; stylized as imlek) is a Serbian food company based in Belgrade, Serbia. It is specialized in processing milk and produces dairy products.

The company was established in 1953 and owns six production facilities in Serbia, Bosnia and Herzegovina and North Macedonia.

It also owns a brand of juices named Bifruit selling in North Macedonia.

== History ==
In 1953, a dairy plant was built at the farm "Lepušnica" in Glogonjski Rit (rit means "swampy area") between Belgrade and Pančevo. That was the practical establishment of dairy industry Imlek within PKB Corporation. Around 800 cows gave daily between three and five thousand liters of milk which was sent to the Belgrade market. In 1957, UNICEF granted a line for pasteurizing and bottling 30,000 liters of milk per day. In 1963, the production already exceeded 21 million liters a year. The company was the largest dairy industry in SFR Yugoslavia.

In 2004, the "Salford Investment Fund" became the largest shareholder of Imlek.

Imlek through its subsidiary Mlekara Subotica dairy became the first Serbian manufacturer of fresh milk products to obtain permission to export to the European Union in 2010.

In February 2015, the investment fund Mid Europa Partners bought "Danube Foods Group" (which at the time owned Imlek a.d. and several other notable Serbian food companies) for a sum of 575 million euros. Later, Mlekara Subotica was merged into Imlek, thus way ceasing its operations; company's facilities in Subotica have since been used by Imlek. Since 2015, assets of Mid Europe Partners in Serbia which include Imlek, Bambi and Knjaz Miloš, are managed by "Moji Brendovi" consultant firm.

In September 2018, a fire broke out in one of Imlek's main facilities, which later caused temporary re-organization of production. As of March 2019, the company owns six production facilities, four facilities in Serbia, one in Bosnia and Herzegovina, and one in North Macedonia.

== Subsidiaries ==
This is a list of subsidiary companies of Imlek:

- Imlek Boka d.o.o. Kotor, Montenegro
- Mljekara a.d. Laktaši, Bosnia and Herzegovina
- Mlijekoprodukt d.o.o. Kozarska Dubica, Bosnia and Herzegovina
- East Milk d.o.o. Sarajevo, Bosnia and Herzegovina
- AD IMB Mlekara Bitola, North Macedonia
- Balkan Dairy Products BV, The Netherlands
- Mljekara Sinj d.o.o. Zagreb, Croatia
