= Regina Maria Hospital =

Romanian hospital

Coordinates: 46.77309°N 23.60267°E

The Regina Maria Hospital (Romanian: Spitalul Regina Maria Cluj) is a hospital located at 29 Calea Dorobanților, Cluj-Napoca, Romania that was opened in 2019.

It is owned and operated by the private Regina Maria Health Network and cost €18 million. The building is on seven levels. There are eight medical departments and six surgical specialties. The network has 35,000 health insurance subscribers in Cluj.

Medstor has provided 30 mobile module carts which are designed to help clinicians deliver treatment at the point of care. The hospital has a self-check-in service, the first of its kind in Romania. The software also gives online access to test results.
