= Hardliner (band) =

Canadian hard rock band

- Origin: St. John's, Newfoundland and Labrador, Canada
- Genres: Hard rock
- Years active: 1999–2004; 2009–2010
- Label: Runaway Wreckords

Hardliner was a Canadian hard rock band from St. John's, Newfoundland and Labrador, that formed in 1999. The band performed at St. John's music venues and released a six-song EP, entitled Generation Why? in 2001. The band had interviews on Canada's CBC Radio, as well as interviews and live footage aired on MuchMusic's programme Going Coastal.

Hardliner was active from 1999–2004, at which time the band went on an indefinite hiatus. Hardliner reunited in 2009 to play some live shows, and then went back on hiatus in late-2010.

== Discography ==
Year	Title
2001	Generation Why? E.P. (CD)

== Band members ==
- John Nolan - vocals (2000–2003, 2009–2010)
- Dan Moore - guitar (2000–2003, 2009–2010)
- Brad Dooley - guitar (2009–2010)
- Paul Gruchy - bass (1999–2004, 2009–2010)
- Doug Rowe - drums (1999–2004, 2009–2010)

== Former members ==
- Mike Gruchy - vocals (1999, 2003–2004)
- Daryl Downey - vocals (2000)
- Darren Ford - guitar (1999–2000)
- Steve Kennedy - guitar (2001–2004)
- Craig Pardy - guitar (2003–2004)
