= Coca-Cola HBC =

Swiss beverage company

Coca-Cola HBC AG
- Type: Public
- Traded as: LSE: CCH; Athex: EEE; FTSE 100 Component
- Founded: 1969; 57 years ago, in Athens, Greece (as Hellenic Bottling Company S.A.); 2000; 26 years ago (as Coca-Cola Hellenic Bottling Company S.A.); 2013; 13 years ago (as Coca-Cola HBC AG)
- Headquarters: Steinhausen, Zug, Switzerland
- Key people: Anastassis G David (Chairperson); Zoran Bogdanović (CEO)
- Products: Alcohol-free beverages
- Revenue: ▲€11,604.5 million (2025)
- Operating income: ▲€1,305.6 million (2025)
- Net income: ▲€940.3 million (2025)
- Owner: The Kar-Tess Group (23.3%); The Coca-Cola Company (23.2%)
- Website: www.coca-colahellenic.com

Coca-Cola HBC AG, formerly known as Coca-Cola Hellenic Bottling Company or just Coca-Cola Hellenic, is the world's third-largest Coca-Cola anchor bottler in terms of volume with sales of more than 2 billion unit cases. Coca-Cola HBC's shares are primarily listed on the London Stock Exchange with a secondary listing on the Athens Stock Exchange. The company is a constituent of the FTSE 100 Index. Coca-Cola HBC has been named the industry leader among beverage companies in the 2014 Dow Jones Sustainability Index and is also included in the FTSE4Good Index.

== History ==
Hellenic Bottling Company S.A. (Greek: Ελληνική Εταιρεία Εμφιαλώσεως) was incorporated under the laws of Greece in 1969, with headquarters in Athens. The Coca-Cola Company granted to the company its bottling rights in the country in that same year.

The company merged with the Nigerian Bottling Company, founded by Anastasios George Leventis, in 1981.

In August 2000 Hellenic Bottling Company S.A. acquired Coca-Cola Beverages Ltd, the former European operations of Coca-Cola Amatil, and formed Coca-Cola Hellenic Bottling Company S.A.

In October 2012, the company announced that it was moving its operational headquarters to Switzerland and would switch its main market listing to London. This was a major blow to the Athens stock market, as Coca-Cola Hellenic was its largest listed company by value. Reasons for the move included better access to financing and a move away from crisis ridden Greece, which had prompted ratings agencies to downgrade its credit over the summer to three notches above "junk" level.

In April 2013, the company changed its name from Coca-Cola Hellenic Bottling Company to Coca-Cola HBC AG and its domicile from Greece to Switzerland. On 29 April 2013 Coca-Cola HBC AG, now a Swiss holding company, was admitted to the London Stock Exchange’s main market.

On 11 September 2013 FTSE Russell announced the company's inclusion into the FTSE 100 and FTSE All-Share indices. Coca-Cola HBC was named the industry leader among beverage companies in the 2014 Dow Jones Sustainability Index.

On 24 July 2014 Coca-Cola HBC AG announced its delisting of its American depositary receipts (ADRs) from the New York Stock Exchange, the termination of its ADR programme, and the deregistration and termination of its reporting obligations under the U.S. Securities Exchange Act of 1934.

In October 2017 the company's chief executive officer, Dimitris Lois, died after a period of illness. On 7 December 2017, Zoran Bogdanović was appointed as new chief executive officer by the board of directors.

In January 2019, the Coca-Cola HBC announced that its carbonated water brand Valser would use captured carbon from the direct air capture company Climeworks, and in 2021, a Coca-Cola HBC official stated in an interview with The Wall Street Journal that 30 percent of their production was done with captured carbon from Climeworks.

On 18 February 2019, the company announced a deal valued at €260 million to acquire Serbian food company Bambi from Mid Europa Partners.

== Operations ==
Coca-Cola HBC operates in 29 countries in 3 continents; its well established markets include Greece (its headquarters before 2013), Cyprus, Republic of Ireland and Northern Ireland (while Great Britain is served by Coca-Cola Europacific Partners), Austria, Switzerland and Italy, its developing markets include Poland, the Baltic States, Czech Republic, Slovenia, Slovakia, Hungary, and Croatia. Its emerging markets include Romania, Bosnia and Herzegovina, Ukraine, Belarus, Montenegro, Armenia, Moldova, North Macedonia, Bulgaria, Serbia, Nigeria and Egypt.

The company's stock is 23.3% owned by the Kar-Tess Holding (a Luxembourg company) and 23.2% by The Coca-Cola Company. The remaining 53.5% are in free float, of which about two-thirds are held by UK and US institutional investors.

=== Coca-Cola HBC in Russia ===
On 26 August 2022, it was announced that the Russian division of Coca-Cola HBC would be renamed "Multon Partners".
