= Sage 100 =

Sage accounting software

Sage 100 or Sage100cloud, formerly known as Sage 100 ERP, and before that Sage MAS 90 or Sage MAS 200, is accounting software offered by Sage.

First offered in the mid 1980s by a company called State of the Art, Inc, the Master Accounting Series for the 90s, gained significant market share by developing a reseller channel largely made up of Certified Public Accountants (CPAs). These accountants used the product in their own practice, became familiar with it, then subsequently recommended it to their client base. Over time, as technology became more complex and rules on Accountants' independence and objectivity became stricter, nearly all CPAs gravitated away from reselling the software. Now Sage 100 ERP (see below) is primarily re-sold by a network of independent software consultants.

In 1998 State of The Art was acquired by U.K. based Sage Group PLC.

In October 2011 Sage released version 4.50 of the MAS 90 (and MAS 200) product line, which included an option to use a Microsoft SQL Server database and also an included single user license for Sage CRM. With the release of version 4.50 Sage discontinued their bundled version labeled Sage Extended Enterprise which combined Sage ERP MAS 200, Sage CRM and Sage FAS Fixed Assets and instead merged those features into the core Sage ERP MAS 90 and 200 4.50.

During the Sage Summit 2011 partner and customer conference, Sage North America announced that many of their products, including Sage ERP MAS 90 and 200, would undergo a rebranding in 2012. Beginning with the next release of Sage ERP MAS 90 and 200 the product would be rebranded as Sage 100 ERP. More specifically Sage ERP MAS 90 would launch as Sage 100 Standard ERP and Sage ERP MAS 200 would launch as Sage 100 Advanced ERP . The edition with a SQL Server database would launch as Sage 100 Premium ERP.

Sage 100 Standard operates in a file server environment. Sage 100 Advanced is functionally equivalent, but operates in a client–server environment running under Windows 20xx operating systems.

Sage 100 primarily targets the wholesale distribution industry, and most of the continued development and enhancement to the software line is centered on the wholesale distribution and warehouse management niche. However, it has many enhancements making it suitable for other industries as well; at present, there are over 20 separate software modules, including some for light manufacturing and e-commerce.

Sage 100 uses SAP Business Objects' Crystal Reports for almost all of its built-in and custom reports. Some of the remaining 'legacy' modules, such as Work Order Processing or Job Cost still have 'hard coded' non-user editable reports, but users can still create new reports using the included Crystal Reports tool.

In November 2015 Sage introduced Sage 100c which was primarily a subscription version of Sage 100 with a modernized interface. Gradually additional Sage 100c specific integrations were added as a benefit of subscription.

In 2018, Sage announced that Sage 100c will be renamed as Sage 100cloud to both highlight the benefits of its connected cloud capabilities and stress its integration capabilities with Sage Business Cloud.

== Reception ==
A 1990 American Institute of Certified Public Accountants member survey found that 12% had State of the Art installed, in second place for general accounting software behind Peachtree Software (17%) and ahead of ACCPAC (8%); 2% of users would not recommend State of the Art. In addition, 6% used State of the Art for client write-up.
