= Noventiq =

International IT company

- Industry: IT consulting; cloud computing; software distribution; computer software; computer security
- Founded: 1993
- Founder: Igor Borovikov
- Headquarters: London
- Key people: Torgrim Takle (CEO)
- Revenue: $1.6 billion (FY23)
- Net income: $176 million (gross)
- Number of employees: 6400 (2023)
- Website: noventiq.com

Noventiq Holdings plc (formerly known as Softline Holding plc) is an Information technology company focusing on digital transformation and cybersecurity. Headquartered in London, and incorporated in Cayman Islands, the company operates in roughly 60 countries in Western and Eastern Europe, Central and Southeast Asia, Latin America, India, and the Middle East.

== History ==
The company was founded in 1993 in Moscow under the name of Softline as a supplier of scientific software. It later expanded its list of partners with Microsoft, Symantec, IBM, and up to 500 other vendors.

Starting in 2002, it expanded with representative offices in a number of the Russian and CIS cities in the following years. By that time, its services included IT outsourcing and audit, SAP and Microsoft Dynamics consulting. Since 2008, Softline expanded to over 30 countries outside CIS. In 2009, the company launched a venture investment arm. In 2014, it opened a subsidiary in India.

In 2016, the company received investments from the Da Vinci Capital fund. The company has conducted a number of mergers and acquisitions with the help of the M&A team established in 2016, which was based in Moscow and London.

In 2020, Softline relocated its HQ to London. In the same year, its annual revenue exceeded $1.8 billion. In October 2021, Softline ran an IPO on LSE. Following the 2022 Russian invasion of Ukraine, in October, Softline ceased operations in Russia and sold its Russian assets to the company's founder Igor Borovikov. The same day the company announced a rebranding to Noventiq.

In April 2023, Borovikov sold Softline Russia to a local investor.

On July 26, 2023 Noventiq announced the cancellation of listing of the Global depository receipts ("GDRs") on the London Stock Exchange.

== M&A ==
In 2020, the company acquired an Indian IT company Embee, a software development company Aplana, and a German Softline AG consulting company (namesake company) which operated in Austria, Belgium, Netherlands, and the UK. In 2022, Softline acquired Academy IT, majority stake in Softclub, Belitsoft, MMTR Technology, Umbrella Infocare, Seven Seas Technology, Makronet, Value Point Systems, Saga Group, G7CR.

In May 2023, Noventiq signed business combination agreement with the Corner Growth Acquisition Corp to achieve NASDAQ listing.

== Management ==
Jacques Guers is the non-executive chairman of the board of Noventiq, Hervé Tessler the global CEO, and founder and coowner Igor Borovikov was a non-executive director. In April 2023, Borovikov sold his shares to a fund managed by TETIS Capital and resigned from management.
