= Plasmon (dairy product) =

Dried milk product

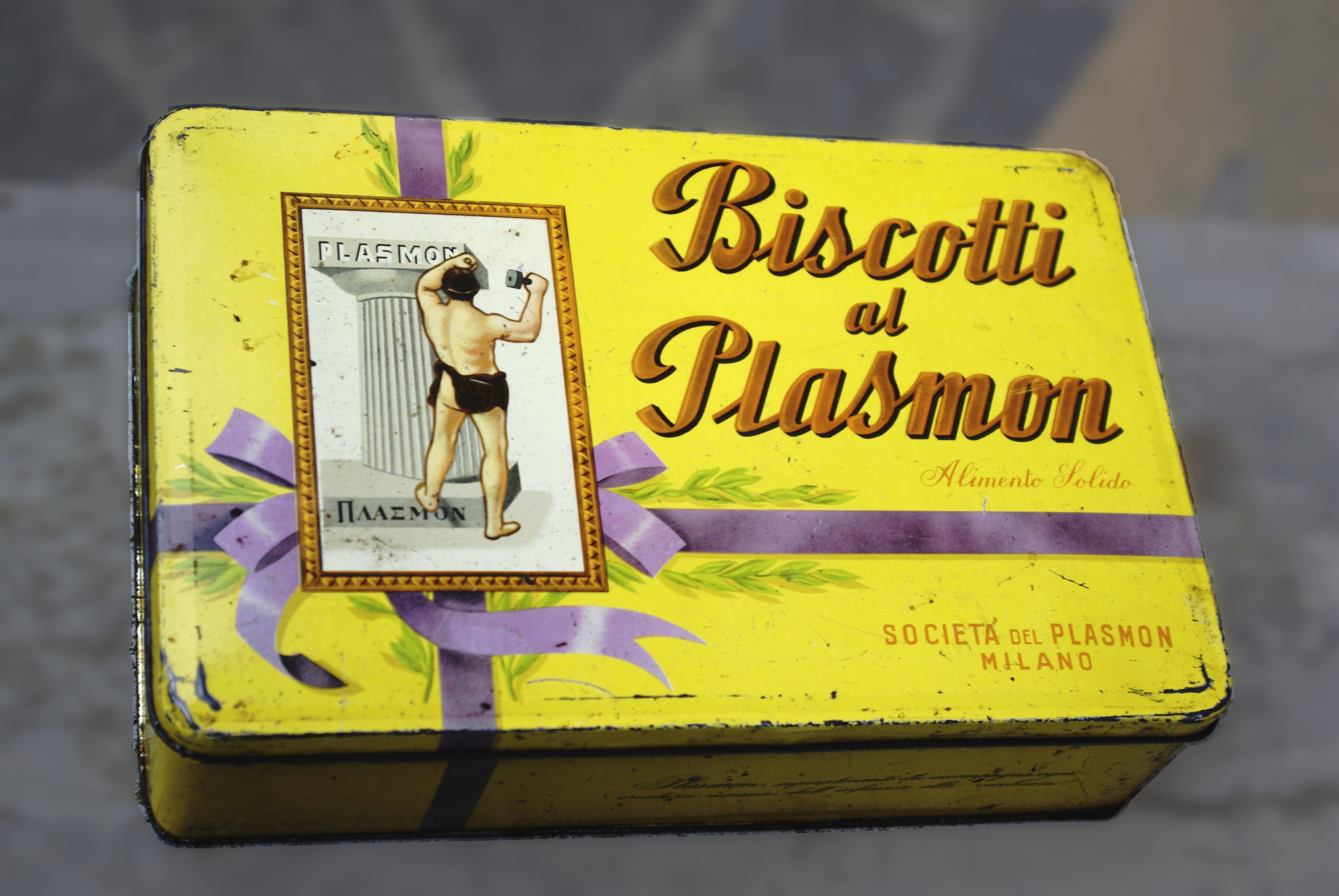
Metal box of Plasmon biscuits

Plasmon is a proprietary dried milk product. It has been commonly utilized as a fortifying agent in Plasmon biscuits. The manufacturers claimed that three pounds (1.4 kg) of Plasmon equaled 100 imperial pints (57 L) of milk. Plasmon was manufactured by the International Plasmon Company and was added to a number of different products to make Plasmon Oats, Plasmon Cocoa and Plasmon Biscuits. Plasmon biscuits continue to be manufactured in Italy by the H. J. Heinz Company.

== History ==
Plasmon is a powder, milk albumen, which could be mixed into various other foods to make it palatable. Plasmon biscuits were popular around the turn of the 20th century and were considered a health food. They were used by Ernest Shackleton in his Antarctic Expedition of 1902. On Christmas Day he wrote, "Had a hot lunch. I was cook: – Bovril, chocolate and plasmon biscuit, two spoonfuls of jam each. Grand!". A variety of plasmon biscuit, said to be like digestives, was also made by Jacob's in 1915.

Victor Whitechurch's fictional vegetarian detective Thorpe Hazell ate plasmon biscuits daily. The journal of actress Ellen Terry records that George Bernard Shaw "generally dined off a plasmon biscuit and a bean!". George Strachey Fawle (1856–1936), a director of the International Plasmon Company (Ltd.), said he attributed his recovery from serious illness to plasmon. Samuel L. Clemens (Mark Twain) was an investor in the company and also promoted the powder's health benefits. He ate it daily himself, induced various members of his family to take it in its more palatable forms and kept the reading table by his bed well stocked with a variety of the products, inviting callers to try a sample. J.Y.M. MacAlister, another investor in the company, and Clemens are credited by Clemens' biographer, Albert Paine, with convincing the Medical Director-General of the British Army to adopt plasmon as a food for convalescent soldiers during the Second Boer War. Paine himself was urged to try the various products and reports that one of its more palatable forms was the "preparation of chocolate".

=== Physical culture ===
Plasmon consumption was advocated by the physical culture and vegetarian communities during the early 20th century. It was marketed as a food to gain muscle and strength. In 1901, Eugen Sandow stated that "Plasmon is the essential food I have so long wish for and I would never be without it". Advertisements for Plasmon often contained pseudoscientific health claims that promoted concepts of masculinity.

Eustace Miles, a physical culturist and vegetarian, promoted plasmon as a muscle-building food suitable for children, adults and athletes.

=== Plasmon Society ===
In Italy, the Plasmon Society, founded initially as the Italian Plasmon Syndicate in 1902 until its renaming in 1916, based in Milan, grew to prominence during the interwar period and after World War II, going from importing and marketing pure plasmon, to producing and selling plasmon biscuits, plasmon pasta, and plasmon chocolate. They were later acquired by the H. J. Heinz Company in 1963, renamed to Plasmon Dietetic Food in 1976, and directly incorporated into the company by 1995, still producing its products such as its Plasmon biscuits.

In Serbia, it is often said that following the acquisition of the Plasmon Society by Heinz, mass layoffs occurred at the factories which operated at the time, with one of the laid-off workers, Petar Tutavac (1934-2022), deciding to return to his native hometown of Požarevac and setting in motion the foundation of the Serbian food company Bambi a.d. and the creation of its popular Plazma biscuits in 1967 and 1968 respectively, sold as Lane biscuits outside of former Yugoslavia to avoid further litigation from Heinz. This origin story has been disputed by Bambi's founder, Momčilo Filipović, who explained in an interview how Plazma's creation stemmed from his ambition to expand Leskovac’s wheat mill into biscuit production, an idea which was not met with much enthusiasm by the city, which wanted to develop its more traditional textiles industry instead. After acquiring the rights and technology from Italian producers after lengthy negotiations, Bambi was set up in Požarevac, and Tutovac, in actuality a master-baker from a small biscuit factory in Croatia, was brought on board, only to rise up to become the technical director.
