= Sage 300 =

Software company in Canada

- Sage 300 Logo
- Developer: Sage Group
- Initial release: 1976; 50 years ago
- Stable release: Sage 300 2024.1 / 30 November 2023; 2 years ago
- Written in: C and C++
- Operating system: Microsoft Windows
- Available in: 5 languages
- List of languages English, French (Canadian), Spanish, Chinese (Simplified), Chinese (Traditional)
- Type: ERP
- Website: www.sage.com/en-us/products/sage-300/

Sage 300 is the name for the mid-market line of enterprise management and accounting applications (formerly Sage ACCPAC), primarily serving small and medium-sized businesses. Since 2004, Sage 300 is developed by Sage. In 2012, Sage renamed ACCPAC to Sage 300.

== Features ==
Sage 300 is a Windows based range of ERP software, running on Microsoft SQL. This can run under a Windows environment and has an option of being hosted by Sage. Sage 300 is a modular system with the following core suite of modules. The full list of modules developed in the Sage 300 API is also available.

=== Financials suite ===
- General ledger
- Bank services
- Tax services
- Accounts payable
- Accounts receivable
- Asset Management Services
- Multi-company

=== Operations suite ===
- Inventory control
- Purchase orders
- (Sales) Order Entry

=== Payroll ===
- US and Canadian payroll

=== Core options ===
- Multi-currency
- Project and job costing
- Transaction analysis and optional fields

It is multi-user, multi-currency, and multi-language. It is available in six languages: English, Spanish, French, Italian and Chinese (Simplified and Traditional).

== History ==
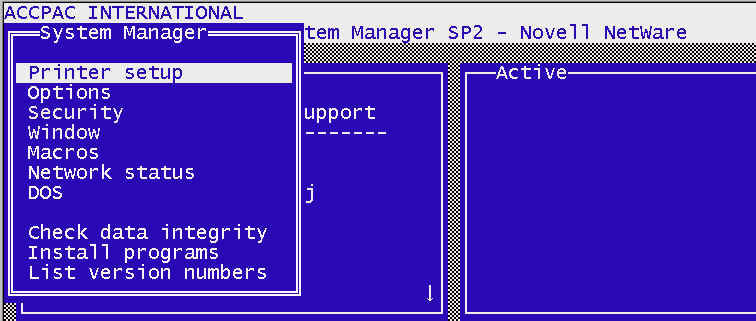
Accpac Plus screenshot

The original product, EasyBusiness Systems, was developed for the CP/M operating system in 1976 by Don Thomson, Ted Comfoltey, Keith Wales, and Norm Francis of Basic Software Group and distributed by Information Unlimited Software. This was ported to MS-DOS and the IBM-PC in 1983.

Computer Associates acquired Information Unlimited Software in 1983 and ran it as an independent business unit. Easy Business Systems added payroll processing in 1984 and supported multiuser networking at this time. In 1987, it implemented a multi-window interface to allow moving between different modules. Easy Business Systems was renamed Accpac Plus in 1987 with the release of version 5. Accpac became popular in Canada with support of Canadian public accounting firms that would sell and support the software. The name Accpac is an acronym for 'A Complete and Comprehensive Program for Accounting Control'. The first Windows version, CA-Accpac/2000, popularly known as ACCPAC for Windows, was developed in the early 1990s and released in October 1994. The Windows version marked the move to client/server and was developed with all new code in COBOL with Computer Associates development tools (these components were redeveloped in 2001 in Accpac Advantage Series with a core business layer developed in C and a user interface layer developed in Visual Basic).

In October 1996 ACCPAC for Windows 2.0 was released. In August 2001, the company presented ACCPAC Advantage Series 5.0, its first web-based version. The web interface was rebuilt in Sage 300 2016 for cross browser support, running on IIS with ASP.Net, a web API was added in the 2017. Sage 300 initially ran on Btrieve Databases and then supported a variety of database backends. Since Sage 300 2016 only the MS SQL database is supported.

Sage Software acquired Accpac from Computer Associates in 2004. Sage renamed it Sage Accpac ERP in 2006, then Sage ERP Accpac in 2009. Sage dropped the Accpac name in 2012 when it was renamed to Sage 300 ERP.

== Reception ==
A 1990 American Institute of Certified Public Accountants member survey found that 8% had ACCPAC installed, in third place for general accounting software behind Peachtree Software (17%) and MAS 90/Evolution (12%); 2% of users would not recommend ACCPAC. In addition, 3% used ACCPAC for client write-up.

== Branding, editions and versions ==
Branding	Edition	Internal Version	Owner	Year	Databases
Sage 300 2025	Standard/Advanced/Premium	7.2	Sage Group	2024	MS SQL
Sage 300 2024	Standard/Advanced/Premium	7.1	Sage Group	2023	MS SQL
Sage 300 2023	Standard/Advanced/Premium	7.0	Sage Group	2022	MS SQL
Sage 300 2022	Standard/Advanced/Premium	6.9	Sage Group	2021	MS SQL
Sage 300 2021	Standard/Advanced/Premium	6.8	Sage Group	2020	MS SQL
Sage 300 2020	Standard/Advanced/Premium	6.7	Sage Group	2019	MS SQL
Sage 300 2019	Standard/Advanced/Premium	6.6	Sage Group	2018	MS SQL
Sage 300 2018	Standard/Advanced/Premium	6.5	Sage Group	2017	MS SQL
Sage 300 2017	Standard/Advanced/Premium	6.4	Sage Group	2016	MS SQL
Sage 300 2016	Standard/Advanced/Premium	6.3	Sage Group	2015	MS SQL
Sage 300 2014	Standard/Advanced/Premium	6.2	Sage Group	2013	Pervasive PSQL, MS SQL, Oracle
Sage 300 ERP 2012	Standard/Advanced/Premium	6.1	Sage Group	2012	Pervasive PSQL, MS SQL, Oracle
Sage ERP Accpac 6.0	100/200/500	6.0	Sage Group	2010	Pervasive PSQL, MS SQL, Oracle
Sage Accpac ERP 5.6	100/200/500	5.6	Sage Group	2009	Pervasive.SQL, MS SQL, Oracle
Sage Accpac ERP 5.5	100/200/500	5.5	Sage Group	2008	Pervasive.SQL, MS SQL, IBM DB2, Oracle
Sage Accpac ERP 5.4	100/200/500	5.4	Sage Group	2006	Pervasive.SQL, MS SQL, IBM DB2, Oracle
Sage Accpac ERP 5.3	100/200/500	5.3	Sage Group	2004	Pervasive.SQL, MS SQL, IBM DB2, Oracle
Accpac Advantage Series 5.3	Small Business/Corporate/Enterprise	5.3	Accpac International	2004	
Accpac Advantage Series 5.2	Small Business/Corporate/Enterprise	5.2	Accpac International	2003	
Accpac Advantage Series 5.1	Small Business/Corporate/Enterprise	5.1	Accpac International		
Accpac Advantage Series 5.0	Small Business/Corporate/Enterprise	5.0	Accpac International	2001	
Accpac Corporate Series 4.2	Discovery/Small Business/Corporate/Director/Executive	4.2	Accpac International	2000	Pervasive.SQL, MS SQL
Accpac Corporate Series 4.1	Discovery/Small Business/Corporate/Director/Executive	4.1	Accpac International	1999	Pervasive.SQL, MS SQL
Accpac Corporate Series 4.0	Discovery/Small Business/Corporate/Director/Executive	4.0	Accpac International		Btrieve 6.15 Workstation Engine / Pervasive.SQL 7.0
Accpac for Windows 3.0	Discovery/Small Business/Corporate/Director/Executive	3.0	Accpac International		
Accpac for Windows 2.0	Plus	2.0	Accpac International	1996	Btrieve (16 and 32 Bit)
CA-Accpac/2000		1.0	Computer associates	1994	Btrieve 6.15

== See also ==
- Comparison of accounting software
- Sage Group
