= Mid Europa Partners =

Private equity company

MidEuropa
- Type: Private Ownership
- Industry: Private Equity
- Founded: 1999; 27 years ago
- Headquarters: London, UK
- Products: Secondary Investments; Equity co-investments
- Total assets: €5.3 billion
- Website: www.mideuropa.com

MidEuropa is an independent private equity player in Central and Eastern Europe focused on Central and Eastern Europe with approximately €5.3 billion of assets under management.

== Strategy ==
MidEuropa seeks to take controlling stakes in its investments either on its own or working alongside other financial or strategic partners. They typically invest €50 million to €300 million in companies with enterprise values ranging from €100 million to €1,500 million, which are cash-flow generative and have dominant market positions in sectors with high barriers to entry.

In June 2007, MidEuropa (holding 65%) and France Telecom (35%) acquired the Austrian mobile phone network One for value of about €1.4 billion. The network was thereafter re-branded as Orange Austria. In February 2012, Orange Austria was then sold to Hutchison 3G, which merged the networks and ended use of the Orange brand.

In October 2008, MidEuropa increased their shareholding in T-Mobile Czech Republic and Ceske Radiokommunikace. Other major investments by MidEuropa include the acquisition of UPC Slovenia, LUX Med, comprehensive outpatient medical care and diagnostic services to corporate and individual subscribers; Centrum medyczne LIM, the third largest private healthcare provider in Poland; and DISA, provider of moulding and metal surface preparation equipment.

In October 2009, MidEuropa bought Invitel, the Hungarian unit of TDC, Denmark's leading provider of land-line phone access. The controlling share was purchases for EUR€ 7.4 million. In addition to the 64.6% stake in Invitel Holdings AS, MidEuropa has also agreed to take on all rights and obligations of an existing € 34.1 million subordinated PIK loan, and submit a tender offer for a € 125 million loan due in 2013.

In July 2018, MidEuropa bought 55% shares of MediGroup, the leading private healthcare provider in Serbia with 13 facilities across key cities. The seller, Blue Sea Capital, retained a 45% stake in the company. The private healthcare system MediGroup emerged in 2013 by acquisition of the most prominent and the oldest private healthcare institutions in the country, and now it is the biggest and the only private comprehensive healthcare system regarding the number of patients, procedures and locations in the region.

In June 2021, MidEuropa led the simultaneous acquisition and subsequent merger of UAB Pigu (Pigu) and Hobby Hall Group OÜ (HHG) to create the largest generalist online marketplace platform operating across three Baltic states with a growing presence in Finland.
