= Death at the Helm =

1941 novel

- First Edition (US)
- Author: John Rhode
- Language: English
- Series: Lancelot Priestley
- Genre: Detective
- Publisher: Collins Crime Club (UK); Dodd Mead (US)
- Publication date: 1941
- Publication place: United Kingdom
- Media type: Print
- Preceded by: Murder at Lilac Cottage
- Followed by: They Watched by Night

Death at the Helm is a 1941 detective novel by John Rhode, the pen name of the British writer Cecil Street. It is the thirty fourth in his long-running series of novels featuring Lancelot Priestley, a Golden Age armchair detective. It makes reference to earlier stories in the series as the lawyer had defended in court the murderers Priestley had exposed in The Corpse in the Car and Death on the Boat Train. The characters in it were arguably more complexly drawn than in other books by the author.

== Synopsis ==
The wife of the celebrated barrister Hugh Quarrenden and another man die, apparently of poisoning after drinking a gin cocktail aboard the yacht Lonicera. Priestley deduces that the drinks had been spiked, but has to work out who would want to kill the couple. Before long he discovers that they both have complex private lives.

== Bibliography ==
- Evans, Curtis. Masters of the "Humdrum" Mystery: Cecil John Charles Street, Freeman Wills Crofts, Alfred Walter Stewart and the British Detective Novel, 1920-1961. McFarland, 2014.
- Magill, Frank Northen . Critical Survey of Mystery and Detective Fiction: Authors, Volume 3. Salem Press, 1988.
- Reilly, John M. Twentieth Century Crime & Mystery Writers. Springer, 2015.
