= Family Affairs (novel) =

1950 novel

- First edition
- Author: John Rhode
- Language: English
- Series: Lancelot Priestley
- Genre: Detective
- Publisher: Geoffrey Bles (UK); Dodd Mead (US)
- Publication date: 1950
- Publication place: United Kingdom
- Media type: Print
- Preceded by: The Two Graphs
- Followed by: The Secret Meeting

Family Affairs is a 1950 detective novel by John Rhode, the pen name of the British writer Cecil Street. It is the fifty first in his long-running series of novels featuring Lancelot Priestley, a Golden Age armchair detective. It was published in America by Dodd Mead under the alternative title The Last Suspect. It has been described as "probably the best post-war Rhode novel".

Julian MacLaren-Ross in the Times Literary Supplement felt that "Mr. Rhode’s description of police methods is as factual as ever, but his method of murder, it might have been imagined, had long ago been considered, "together with mysterious Chinamen, inadmissible by practitioners in this genre." While Maurice Richardson in The Observer wondered "But can we, even from dear, steady, reliable Mr. Rhode, tolerate a blowpipe and curare?"

== Synopsis ==
Two separate deaths in different parts of the country, at a brewery and a birthday party, are investigated by Superintendent Waghorn of Scotland Yard. With some assistance from Priestley he is able to tie the two case together.

== Bibliography ==
- Evans, Curtis. Masters of the "Humdrum" Mystery: Cecil John Charles Street, Freeman Wills Crofts, Alfred Walter Stewart and the British Detective Novel, 1920-1961. McFarland, 2014.
- Herbert, Rosemary. Whodunit?: A Who's Who in Crime & Mystery Writing. Oxford University Press, 2003.
- Magill, Frank Northen . Critical Survey of Mystery and Detective Fiction: Authors, Volume 4. Salem Press, 1988.
- Reilly, John M. Twentieth Century Crime & Mystery Writers. Springer, 2015.
