= The Lake House (Rhode novel) =

1946 novel

- First edition
- Author: John Rhode
- Language: English
- Series: Lancelot Priestley
- Genre: Detective
- Publisher: Geoffrey Bles (UK); Dodd Mead (US)
- Publication date: 1946
- Publication place: United Kingdom
- Media type: Print
- Preceded by: Bricklayer's Arms
- Followed by: Death in Harley Street

The Lake House is a 1946 detective novel by John Rhode, the pen name of the British writer Cecil Street. It is the forty second in his long-running series of novels featuring Lancelot Priestley, a Golden Age armchair detective. It was his first novel after returning to his original publisher Geoffrey Bles after all his books between 1931 and 1945 had been published by Collins. His other series featuring Desmond Merrion continued to be released by Collins.

Maurice Richardson in The Observer summarised it "Dr. Priestley and his white-headed boys are at it again, cosy, fussy, consequential and full of interesting ratiocination, solving The Lake House, by John Rhode. This is a small town killing which leads to a big trial and an outstanding piece of reconstruction, including histrionics, by the Doc and his amanuensis Harold Merefield. Need I, must I, say more?" Another review in The Spectator felt "although without any merit of humour or characterisation, The Lake House is certainly a good mystery."

== Bibliography ==
- Evans, Curtis. Masters of the "Humdrum" Mystery: Cecil John Charles Street, Freeman Wills Crofts, Alfred Walter Stewart and the British Detective Novel, 1920-1961. McFarland, 2014.
- Herbert, Rosemary. Whodunit?: A Who's Who in Crime & Mystery Writing. Oxford University Press, 2003.
- Magill, Frank Northen . Critical Survey of Mystery and Detective Fiction: Authors, Volume 4. Salem Press, 1988.
- Reilly, John M. Twentieth Century Crime & Mystery Writers. Springer, 2015.
