= Death at the Dance =

1952 novel

- Author: John Rhode
- Language: English
- Series: Lancelot Priestley
- Genre: Detective
- Publisher: Geoffrey Bles (UK); Dodd Mead (US)
- Publication date: 1952
- Publication place: United Kingdom
- Media type: Print
- Preceded by: Doctor Goodwood's Locum
- Followed by: Death in Wellington Road

Death at the Dance is a 1952 mystery detective novel by John Rhode, the pen name of the British writer Cecil Street. It is the fifty fourth in his long-running series of novels featuring Lancelot Priestley, a Golden Age armchair detective. It was published in America the same year by Dodd Mead. It is set in a county in the West of England, a thinly-disguised Cornwall. Maurice Richardson wrote in The Observer "Not even the corniest of plots can make Rhode unreadable". More recently it has been described as offering a "clever plot with, unusual for Street, a hard-to-spot murderer and motive, as well as an appealing rural setting: a mysterious Hardyesque landscape of abandoned nineteenth century tin mines.

== Synopsis ==
In the small country town of Hadeston the annual festival known as "The Dance" is taking place when an elderly lady among the spectators falls ill and dies. Tests quickly show it was not a natural death, and yet it seems inconceivable that anyone should want to murder a woman not known for having an enemy in the world.

== Bibliography ==
- Evans, Curtis. Masters of the "Humdrum" Mystery: Cecil John Charles Street, Freeman Wills Crofts, Alfred Walter Stewart and the British Detective Novel, 1920–1961. McFarland, 2014.
- Herbert, Rosemary. Whodunit?: A Who's Who in Crime & Mystery Writing. Oxford University Press, 2003.
- Magill, Frank Northen . Critical Survey of Mystery and Detective Fiction: Authors, Volume 4. Salem Press, 1988.
- Reilly, John M. Twentieth Century Crime & Mystery Writers. Springer, 2015.
