= The Double Florin =

1924 novel

- First edition front endpapers
- Author: John Rhode
- Language: English
- Genre: Thriller
- Publisher: Geoffrey Bles
- Publication date: 1924
- Publication place: United Kingdom
- Media type: Print

The Double Florin is a 1924 thriller novel by John Rhode, the pen name of the British writer John Street. Like H.C. McNeile's Bulldog Drummond and Agatha Christie's The Secret Adversary the plot revolves around a Bolshevik conspiracy to destroy capitalism and western democracy. The title refers to the Double florin coin.

It was his second published novel and anticipated the introduction of his best-known character Dr. Priestley in his following book The Paddington Mystery. The conspiracy is being directed by Professor Sanderson, a brilliant mathematician. Sanderson is not himself a communist, but is manipulating the organisation to try and create a new order based on pure reason.

== Synopsis ==
A young English aristocrat Lord Robert Mountmichael is recruited by LIDO, a secret organisation formed by international financiers to battle the forces of disorder. He eventually exposes the Professor as the mastermind behind the plot to destroy Britain's social system as a prelude to world collapse, while falling in love with his daughter Joan. After exposing Sanderson's true motivation, the professor is shot dead by one of his fanatical henchman.

== Bibliography ==
- Evans, Curtis. Masters of the "Humdrum" Mystery: Cecil John Charles Street, Freeman Wills Crofts, Alfred Walter Stewart and the British Detective Novel, 1920-1961. McFarland, 2014.
- Herbert, Rosemary. Whodunit?: A Who's Who in Crime & Mystery Writing. Oxford University Press, 2003.
- Turnbull, Malcolm J. Victims Or Villains: Jewish Images in Classic English Detective Fiction. Popular Press, 1998.
