= Death at the Inn =

1953 novel

- Author: John Rhode
- Language: English
- Series: Lancelot Priestley
- Genre: Detective
- Publisher: Geoffrey Bles (UK); Dodd Mead (US)
- Publication date: 1953
- Publication place: United Kingdom
- Media type: Print
- Preceded by: Death in Wellington Road
- Followed by: By Registered Post

Death at the Inn is a 1953 mystery detective novel by British writer Cecil Street, published under the pen name of John Rhode. The fifty sixth in his long-running series of novels featuring Lancelot Priestley, a Golden Age armchair detective, much of the investigation is done by Superintendent Waghorn of Scotland Yard. Street was one of the most prolific authors of the era, producing both this series and the books featuring Miles Burton. This was one of four books in the series that paid as much attention to the developing police procedural style as to the classic murder mystery plot. The novel was published in London by Geoffrey Bles and in the United States by Dodd Mead using the alternative title The Case of the Forty Thieves.

== Synopsis ==
The death of a man shortly after consuming a cocktail in a popular road house pub in rural England rapidly draws the attention of Scotland Yard. The murdered man, clearly poisoned by something he had ingested with the drink, was already known to the police for his connection with a gang of robbers involved in a series of well-planned thefts of high-value goods being transported around the British railway system. It seems likely that the dead man was murdered because his associates wrongly believed that he was about to confess his role to the authorities.

Assisted by Priestley's deciphering of an apparent secret code that in facts turns out to be an ordnance survey reference and a time of meet, the police try to hunt down the elaborately-controlled organisation (nicknamed after Ali Baba and the Forty Thieves) responsible for these well-planned crimes. Waghorn's attempts to intercept members of the gang at a crossroads in Norfolk turn out to be a well-laid wild goose chase, while the robbers carry off a fresh robbery just a few miles away. Dogged police work eventually brings Waghorn to another rural location where his suspicions are aroused by the new occupants of a rundown country house.

== Critical reception ==
Writing in the New York Times, Anthony Boucher felt that "Superintendent Jimmy Waghorn's bit-by-bit unveiling of these clever rackets sustains a fair amount of interest in a story weak on action and characterisation."

== Bibliography ==
- Evans, Curtis. Masters of the "Humdrum" Mystery: Cecil John Charles Street, Freeman Wills Crofts, Alfred Walter Stewart and the British Detective Novel, 1920-1961. McFarland, 2014.
- Herbert, Rosemary. Whodunit?: A Who's Who in Crime & Mystery Writing. Oxford University Press, 2003.
- Magill, Frank Northen . Critical Survey of Mystery and Detective Fiction: Authors, Volume 4. Salem Press, 1988.
- Reilly, John M. Twentieth Century Crime & Mystery Writers. Springer, 2015.
