= Up the Garden Path (novel) =

1949 novel

- Author: John Rhode
- Language: English
- Series: Lancelot Priestley
- Genre: Detective
- Publisher: Geoffrey Bles (UK); Dodd Mead (US)
- Publication date: 1949
- Publication place: United Kingdom
- Media type: Print
- Preceded by: Blackthorn House
- Followed by: The Two Graphs

Up the Garden Path is a 1949 detective novel by John Rhode, the pen name of the British writer Cecil Street. It is the forty ninth in his long-running series of novels featuring Lancelot Priestley, a Golden Age armchair detective. It was published in America by Dodd Mead under the alternative title The Fatal Garden. Reviewing the novel in The Observer, Maurice Richardson concluded "Mr. Rhode has lost very little of his grip."

== Synopsis ==
Two corpses are found in the garden of the house of an eccentric inventor Gabriel Hockliffe. Unusually Priestley takes an active role in the investigation rather than solving it from a detached distance.

== Bibliography ==
- Evans, Curtis. Masters of the "Humdrum" Mystery: Cecil John Charles Street, Freeman Wills Crofts, Alfred Walter Stewart and the British Detective Novel, 1920-1961. McFarland, 2014.
- Herbert, Rosemary. Whodunit?: A Who's Who in Crime & Mystery Writing. Oxford University Press, 2003.
- Magill, Frank Northen . Critical Survey of Mystery and Detective Fiction: Authors, Volume 4. Salem Press, 1988.
- Reilly, John M. Twentieth Century Crime & Mystery Writers. Springer, 2015.
