= Doctor Goodwood's Locum =

1951 novel

- Author: John Rhode
- Language: English
- Series: Lancelot Priestley
- Genre: Detective
- Publisher: Geoffrey Bles (UK); Dodd Mead (US)
- Publication date: 1951
- Publication place: United Kingdom
- Media type: Print
- Preceded by: The Secret Meeting
- Followed by: Death at the Dance

Doctor Goodwood's Locum is a 1951 mystery detective novel by John Rhode, the pen name of the British writer Cecil Street. It is the fifty third in his long-running series of novels featuring Lancelot Priestley, a Golden Age armchair detective. It was published in America the same year by Dodd Mead under the alternative title The Affair of the Substitute Doctor.

== Synopsis ==
In the market town of Patham, Doctor Greenwood takes his annual August holiday with his wife and hires a locum to take over the practice while he is away. But his replacement Stephen Thornhill goes missing after just a few days, and when a body is discovered Scotland Yard are called in to investigate with the assistance of Priestley.

== Bibliography ==
- Evans, Curtis. Masters of the "Humdrum" Mystery: Cecil John Charles Street, Freeman Wills Crofts, Alfred Walter Stewart and the British Detective Novel, 1920-1961. McFarland, 2014.
- Herbert, Rosemary. Whodunit?: A Who's Who in Crime & Mystery Writing. Oxford University Press, 2003.
- Magill, Frank Northen . Critical Survey of Mystery and Detective Fiction: Authors, Volume 4. Salem Press, 1988.
- Reilly, John M. Twentieth Century Crime & Mystery Writers. Springer, 2015.
