= The Ellerby Case =

1927 novel

- First Edition (UK)
- Author: John Rhode
- Language: English
- Series: Lancelot Priestley
- Genre: Detective
- Publisher: Geoffrey Bles (UK); Dodd Mead (US)
- Publication date: 1927
- Publication place: United Kingdom
- Media type: Print
- Preceded by: Dr. Priestley's Quest
- Followed by: The Murders in Praed Street

The Ellerby Case is a 1927 detective novel by John Rhode, the pen name of the British writer Cecil Street. It marked the third appearance of the armchair detective Lancelot Priestley, who featured in a long-running series of novels during the Golden Age of Detective Fiction. The novel's success led to a contract with Dodd Mead to release it and subsequent novels in the United States, in what proved to be a lucrative arrangement for the author.

The novel is particularly well known for a scene featuring an attempted murder using a hedgehog, with a review in the Evening Standard asking "could there possibly be a more ingenious method of committing a murder?".

== Synopsis ==
Sir Noel Ellerby comes to visit Priestley to complain that his Lincolnshire manor house has been broken into, but nothing apparently taken. Soon afterwards Ellerby is found dead at his home in front of an empty safe. Priestley eventually discovers that his killing is linked to a racket concerning the distribution of contraband saccharine, but nearly loses his life in the process to the ruthless murderer.

== Bibliography ==
- Evans, Curtis. Masters of the "Humdrum" Mystery: Cecil John Charles Street, Freeman Wills Crofts, Alfred Walter Stewart and the British Detective Novel, 1920-1961. McFarland, 2014.
- Herbert, Rosemary. Whodunit?: A Who's Who in Crime & Mystery Writing. Oxford University Press, 2003.
- Reilly, John M. Twentieth Century Crime & Mystery Writers. Springer, 2015.
