= Death of an Author (Rhode novel) =

1947 novel

- First edition
- Author: John Rhode
- Language: English
- Series: Lancelot Priestley
- Genre: Detective
- Publisher: Geoffrey Bles
- Publication date: 1947
- Publication place: United Kingdom
- Media type: Print
- Preceded by: Nothing But the Truth
- Followed by: The Paper Bag

Death of an Author is a 1947 detective novel by John Rhode, the pen name of the British writer Cecil Street. It is the forty fifth in his long-running series of novels featuring Lancelot Priestley, a Golden Age armchair detective. The New Yorker described it as "Rather pleasant, in a ponderous fashion" while Will Cuppy, writing in the New York Herald Tribune, felt "Mr. Rhode provides one of those satisfying British stories in the old tradition, full of mystery meat and brain-work."

== Synopsis ==
Nigel Ebbfleet, an author who after many years of effort has finally produced a successful book, settles down to live in a country cottage brought by the royalties of his hit work. However, his rural peace is shattered when he is killed in an explosion while chopping wood. Superintendent Jimmy Waghorn of Scotland Yard's investigation established that Ebbfleet was well-liked and no obvious motive is clear. With some assistance from Priestley, Waghorn is eventually able to solve the mystery.

== Bibliography ==
- Herbert, Rosemary. Whodunit?: A Who's Who in Crime & Mystery Writing. Oxford University Press, 2003.
- Magill, Frank Northen . Critical Survey of Mystery and Detective Fiction: Authors, Volume 4. Salem Press, 1988.
- Reilly, John M. Twentieth Century Crime & Mystery Writers. Springer, 2015.
