= Death in Harley Street =

1946 novel

- First edition
- Author: John Rhode
- Language: English
- Series: Lancelot Priestley
- Genre: Detective
- Publisher: Geoffrey Bles
- Publication date: 1946
- Publication place: United Kingdom
- Media type: Print
- Preceded by: The Lake House
- Followed by: Nothing But the Truth

Death in Harley Street is a 1946 detective novel by John Rhode, the pen name of the British writer Cecil Street. It is the forty third in his long-running series of novels featuring Lancelot Priestley, a Golden Age armchair detective. Several sources consider it to be the author's masterpiece.

== Synopsis ==
Doctor Richard Mawsley is found dead in the consulting room of his Harley Street practice, apparently from strychnine. Inspector Waghorn of Scotland Yard takes up the case, but it requires the particular brilliance of Priestley to demonstrate that this strange case was neither accident, suicide or murder.

== Bibliography ==
- Evans, Curtis. Masters of the "Humdrum" Mystery: Cecil John Charles Street, Freeman Wills Crofts, Alfred Walter Stewart and the British Detective Novel, 1920-1961. McFarland, 2014.
- Herbert, Rosemary. Whodunit?: A Who's Who in Crime & Mystery Writing. Oxford University Press, 2003.
- Magill, Frank Northen . Critical Survey of Mystery and Detective Fiction: Authors, Volume 4. Salem Press, 1988.
- Reilly, John M. Twentieth Century Crime & Mystery Writers. Springer, 2015.
