= Dead on the Track =

1943 novel

- American first edition
- Author: John Rhode
- Language: English
- Series: Lancelot Priestley
- Genre: Detective
- Publisher: Collins (UK); Dodd Mead (US)
- Publication date: 1943
- Publication place: United Kingdom
- Media type: Print
- Preceded by: The Fourth Bomb
- Followed by: Men Die at Cyprus Lodge

Dead on the Track is a 1943 detective novel by John Rhode, the pen name of British writer Cecil Street. It is the thirty-seventh in his long-running series of novels featuring Lancelot Priestley, a Golden Age armchair detective. Like many mystery novels of the era, it has a railway setting. In theme and plot, it is very similar to the author's earlier 1931 work Tragedy on the Line. It is the first entry in the series since Hendon's First Case (1935) in which Priestley's old associate Hanslet is the lead investigator. The other recurring police officer in the series Inspector Jimmy Waghorn is now working with military intelligence.

== Synopsis ==
Near the small settlement of Filmerham, the stationmaster discovers a body lying close to the tracks, not far from the station. Due to a wartime shortage of police personnel, retired Superintendent Hanslet is called back into action. Recalling an earlier deduction made by Priestley in a similar case, he works towards a solution.

== Bibliography ==
- Evans, Curtis. Masters of the "Humdrum" Mystery: Cecil John Charles Street, Freeman Wills Crofts, Alfred Walter Stewart and the British Detective Novel, 1920-1961. McFarland, 2014.
- Magill, Frank Northen . Critical Survey of Mystery and Detective Fiction: Authors, Volume 3. Salem Press, 1988.
- Reilly, John M. Twentieth Century Crime & Mystery Writers. Springer, 2015.
