= The House on Tollard Ridge =

1929 novel

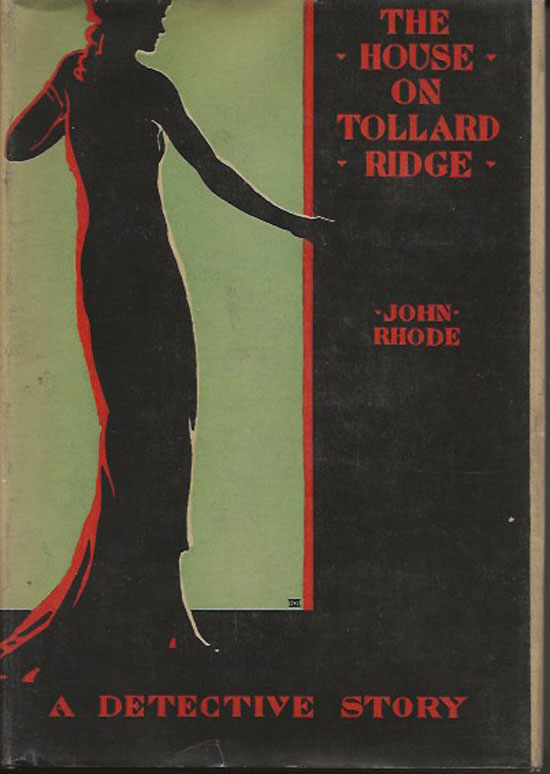
- First Edition (US)
- Author: John Rhode
- Language: English
- Series: Lancelot Priestley
- Genre: Detective
- Publisher: Geoffrey Bles (UK); Dodd Mead (US)
- Publication date: 1929
- Publication place: United Kingdom
- Media type: Print
- Preceded by: Tragedy at the Unicorn
- Followed by: The Davidson Case

The House on Tollard Ridge is a 1929 detective novel by John Rhode, the pen name of the British writer Cecil Street. It marked the sixth appearance of the armchair detective Lancelot Priestley, who featured in a long-running series of novels during the Golden Age of Detective Fiction. The plot was partly inspired by Rudyard Kipling's short story Wireless, which Rhode mentions in the novel.

== Synopsis ==
At the brooding, isolated house of Samuel Barton on Tollard Ridge, the owner of the house is found murdered. The obvious culprit appears to be his wayward son Arthur, and the local police have no difficulty in presenting a case against him and bringing him to trial. Meanwhile Samuel Barton's ward and heiress Kitty plans to use the money to break free of her uninspiring marriage with a local farmer and live a little. A second suspicious death leads to the arrival of the celebrated criminologist Priestley, who soon unearths an elaborate plot of murder.

== Bibliography ==
- Evans, Curtis. Masters of the "Humdrum" Mystery: Cecil John Charles Street, Freeman Wills Crofts, Alfred Walter Stewart and the British Detective Novel, 1920-1961. McFarland, 2014.
- Herbert, Rosemary. Whodunit?: A Who's Who in Crime & Mystery Writing. Oxford University Press, 2003.
- Reilly, John M. Twentieth Century Crime & Mystery Writers. Springer, 2015.
