= Nothing But the Truth (Rhode novel) =

1947 novel

- First edition
- Author: John Rhode
- Language: English
- Series: Lancelot Priestley
- Genre: Detective
- Publisher: Geoffrey Bles
- Publication date: 1947
- Publication place: United Kingdom
- Media type: Print
- Preceded by: Death in Harley Street
- Followed by: Death of an Author

Nothing But the Truth is a 1947 detective novel by John Rhode, the pen name of the British writer Cecil Street. It is the forty fourth in his long-running series of novels featuring Lancelot Priestley, a Golden Age armchair detective.

In a contemporary review in The New York Times Isaac Anderson wrote, "The pattern is the same as in the other Dr. Priestley stories, and it is becoming more than a bit shopworn." However, Will Cuppy, writing in the New York Herald Tribune, was much more positive "Here is real detection in entertaining form, standard Grade A goods."

== Synopsis ==
The wealthy Henry Watlington mysteriously disappears after an evening out, after his chauffeur is too drunk to drive him home, and shortly afterwards his body is found hidden in an AA Phone box by the side of the road. Jimmy Waghorn is assigned to the case and with clues from Priestley is able to crack the mystery.

== Bibliography ==
- Evans, Curtis. Masters of the "Humdrum" Mystery: Cecil John Charles Street, Freeman Wills Crofts, Alfred Walter Stewart and the British Detective Novel, 1920-1961. McFarland, 2014.
- Herbert, Rosemary. Whodunit?: A Who's Who in Crime & Mystery Writing. Oxford University Press, 2003.
- Magill, Frank Northen . Critical Survey of Mystery and Detective Fiction: Authors, Volume 4. Salem Press, 1988.
- Reilly, John M. Twentieth Century Crime & Mystery Writers. Springer, 2015.
