= Mademoiselle From Armentieres (novel) =

1927 film

- Author: John Rhode
- Language: English
- Genre: War
- Publisher: Geoffrey Bles
- Publication date: 1927
- Publication place: United Kingdom
- Media type: Print

Mademoiselle From Armentieres is a 1927 war thriller novel by the British writer John Rhode, the pen name of author and First World War veteran Cecil Street. It takes its title from the popular wartime song of the same name. The novel was promoted in conjunction with the 1926 film Mademoiselle from Armentieres and the cover featured the film's star Estelle Brody. The author is better known for his long-running series of detective novels featuring Doctor Priestley.

== Bibliography ==
- Evans, Curtis. Masters of the "Humdrum" Mystery: Cecil John Charles Street, Freeman Wills Crofts, Alfred Walter Stewart and the British Detective Novel, 1920-1961. McFarland, 2014.
- Onions, John. English Fiction and Drama of the Great War, 1918–39. Springer, 1990.
