= Peril at Cranbury Hall =

1930 novel

- First Edition (UK)
- Author: John Rhode
- Language: English
- Series: Lancelot Priestley
- Genre: Detective
- Publisher: Geoffrey Bles (UK); Dodd Mead (US)
- Publication date: 1930
- Publication place: United Kingdom
- Media type: Print
- Preceded by: The Davidson Case
- Followed by: Pinehurst

Peril at Cranbury Hall is a 1930 detective novel by John Rhode, the pen name of the British writer Cecil Street. It marked the eighth appearance of the armchair detective Lancelot Priestley, who featured in a long-running series of novels during the Golden Age of Detective Fiction. The use of the cipher inspired a similar one used in Dorothy L. Sayers's Have His Carcase

== Synopsis ==
An expensive new clinic is established at Cranbury Hall treating patients for fatigue with an innovative technique. Oliver Gilroy, the brother of one of the clinic's backers, is released from gaol and takes over a key role at the lucrative institution. However a series of attempts of his life draw the interest of Priestley.

== Bibliography ==
- Evans, Curtis. Masters of the "Humdrum" Mystery: Cecil John Charles Street, Freeman Wills Crofts, Alfred Walter Stewart and the British Detective Novel, 1920-1961. McFarland, 2014.
- Herbert, Rosemary. Whodunit?: A Who's Who in Crime & Mystery Writing. Oxford University Press, 2003.
- Reilly, John M. Twentieth Century Crime & Mystery Writers. Springer, 2015.
- Sandberg, Eric. Dorothy L. Sayers: A Companion to the Mystery Fiction. McFarland, 2022.
