= The Murders in Praed Street =

1928 novel

- First Edition (UK)
- Author: John Rhode
- Language: English
- Series: Lancelot Priestley
- Genre: Detective
- Publisher: Geoffrey Bles (UK); Dodd Mead (US)
- Publication date: 1928
- Publication place: United Kingdom
- Media type: Print
- Preceded by: The Ellerby Case
- Followed by: Tragedy at the Unicorn

The Murders in Praed Street is a 1928 detective novel by John Rhode, the pen name of the British writer Cecil Street. It features the fourth appearance of the armchair detective Lancelot Priestley, who figured in a long-running series of novels during the Golden Age of Detective Fiction.

== Film adaptation ==
In 1936 it was adapted into the film Twelve Good Men produced by the British subsidiary of Warner Brothers at Teddington Studios. Directed by Ralph Ince, it starred Henry Kendall, Nancy O'Neil and Joyce Kennedy. It is the only one of the author's novels to be filmed.

== Bibliography ==
- Evans, Curtis. Masters of the "Humdrum" Mystery: Cecil John Charles Street, Freeman Wills Crofts, Alfred Walter Stewart and the British Detective Novel, 1920-1961. McFarland, 2014.
- Goble, Alan. The Complete Index to Literary Sources in Film. Walter de Gruyter, 1999.
- Herbert, Rosemary. Whodunit?: A Who's Who in Crime & Mystery Writing. Oxford University Press, 2003.
- Reilly, John M. Twentieth Century Crime & Mystery Writers. Springer, 2015.
