= The Fourth Bomb =

1942 novel

- American first edition
- Author: John Rhode
- Language: English
- Series: Lancelot Priestley
- Genre: Detective
- Publisher: Collins Crime Club (UK); Dodd Mead (US)
- Publication date: 1942
- Publication place: United Kingdom
- Media type: Print
- Preceded by: They Watched by Night
- Followed by: Dead on the Track

The Fourth Bomb is a 1942 detective novel by John Rhode, the pen name of the British writer Cecil Street. It is the thirty sixth in his long-running series of novels featuring Lancelot Priestley, a Golden Age armchair detective. In The Observer Maurice Richardson wrote "Inspector Waghorn does the investigating, but the evidence is so contradictory and suspicion so widely distributed that the solution calls for Dr. Priestley, whom, you will be sorry to hear, I thought was looking alarmingly shaky. Sound recommendation, of course" while Isaac Anderson in the New York Times wrote "It is merely the familiar Dr. Priestley formula set against the background of wartime England."

== Synopsis ==
At the height of the Second World War, a German air raid sees four bombs dropped on the English village of Yardley Green. Four bombs fall on the settlement, the first three doing some damage and injuring two of the inhabitants. The fourth bomb appears to have killed Gazeley, a prosperous diamond merchant. However it soon transpires that Gazeley had been murdered after the air raid, and a fortune of diamonds he had on his person is now missing. Inspector Waghorn of Scotland Yard calls for the assistance of Doctor Priestley.

== Bibliography ==
- Evans, Curtis. Masters of the "Humdrum" Mystery: Cecil John Charles Street, Freeman Wills Crofts, Alfred Walter Stewart and the British Detective Novel, 1920-1961. McFarland, 2014.
- Magill, Frank Northen . Critical Survey of Mystery and Detective Fiction: Authors, Volume 3. Salem Press, 1988.
- Reilly, John M. Twentieth Century Crime & Mystery Writers. Springer, 2015.
