= Twelve Good Men =

- Nancy O'Neil, Henry Kendall, Grace Lane and Ralph Roberts in a scene from film
- Directed by: Ralph Ince
- Written by: Sidney Gilliat; Frank Launder
- Based on: The Murders in Praed Street by John Rhode
- Produced by: Jerome Jackson
- Starring: Henry Kendall; Nancy O'Neil; Joyce Kennedy
- Cinematography: Basil Emmott
- Production company: Warner Brothers
- Distributed by: Warner Brothers
- Release date: March 1936
- Running time: 64 minutes
- Country: United Kingdom
- Language: English

Twelve Good Men (also known as 12 Good Men) is a lost 1936 British crime film directed by Ralph Ince and starring Henry Kendall, Nancy O'Neil and Joyce Kennedy. It was written by Sidney Gilliat| and Frank Launder based on the 1928 detective novel The Murders in Praed Street by John Rhode, with the principal series character of the book Doctor Priestley eliminated for the film. It was made at Teddington Studios by Warner Brothers as a quota quickie.

== Preservation status ==
The British Film Institute has classed Twelve Good Men as a lost film. Its National Archive holds a collection of stills but no film or video materials.

== Plot ==
An ex-convict is trying to take revenge on the members of the jury who convicted him. Despite being put under police protection at the home of juror and famous actor Charles Drew, two jurors are murdered. Aspiring actress Ann Parkes investigates and catches the killer.

== Cast ==
- Henry Kendall as Charles Drew
- Nancy O'Neil as Ann Parkes
- Joyce Kennedy as Lady Thora
- Percy Parsons as Hopwood
- Morland Graham as Victor Day
- Bernard Miles as Inspector Pine
- Philip Ray as Higgs
- Frederick Burtwell as Fortheringay
- Roddy Hughes as Wiggings
- Sam Springson as Mr Levy
- George Hughes as Jim Bostock
- Madge White as Mrs Goodheart
- Grace Lane as Mrs Parkes
- Ralph Roberts as Mr Parkes

== Reception ==
Kine Weekly wrote: "Murder mystery cleverly sustained, compounded with plenty of human interest and a love affair. Acting and presentation, combined with the original plot and lively dialogue, entitle the picture to a good reception from the average patron. ... Henry Kendall is extremely well cast as the conceited but likeable actor. His performance is live and balanced, making a good foil for the calm of Nancy O'Neill as Ann ... Ralph Ince opens well, working up the mystery while providing clear characterisations. Interest, far from flagging when the truth about the twelve jurymen is arrived at, is strongly maintained in spite of the introduction of one killing after another."

The Daily Film Renter wrote: "Pleasingly presented, with smooth study from Henry Kendall in lead, and measure of romance, this is acceptable quota support for the masses. ... Somewhat slow in the initial stages, the piece nevertheless quickens up to an effective climax that packs a genuine surprise. There are some good dramatic moments, including a realistic car blaze, and the murder of a speedway ace on the Wembley Dirt Track, while the assortment of varied types thrown together by a common danger affords some interesting by-play."

Picturegoer wrote: "Henry Kendall's performance as a conceited but likeable actor is the high-light of this brightly directed and somewhat original story. ... Nancy O'Neil is quite good as the heroine and the various jurymen are well characterised. Bernard Miles is convincing as a detective from Scotland Yard and Percy Parson scores as an ex-convict servant. While a little far-fetched in parts, the interest is quite well maintained. Dialogue is generally bright."

Picture Show wrote: "Far-fetched melodrama ... Good characterisations from the players who appear as the jury, and light-hearted work from Henry Kendall as an actor who is one of them, neat direction and ingenious development help the story."
