= Dr. Priestley's Quest =

1926 novel

- 1935 edition with original image
- Author: John Rhode
- Language: English
- Series: Lancelot Priestley
- Genre: Detective
- Publisher: Geoffrey Bles
- Publication date: 1926
- Publication place: United Kingdom
- Media type: Print
- Preceded by: The Paddington Mystery
- Followed by: The Ellerby Case

Dr. Priestley's Quest is a 1926 detective novel by John Rhode, the pen name of the British writer Cecil Street. It was the second appearance of the armchair detective Lancelot Priestley, who featured in a long-running series of novels during the Golden Age of Detective Fiction. It has been described as the first major detective novel by the author. In its relationship between Priestley and his secretary and future son-in-law Harold Merefield is shown the influence of Conan Doyle's Sherlock Holmes and Watson. Similarly, Inspector Hanslet of Scotland Yard fulfils a similar role to that of Lestrade.

== Synopsis ==
Austin Heatherdale is killed on a lonely in what appears to be a casual robbery. However his brother Gerald demonstrates to Priestley that he believes the attack was pre-meditated and fears for his own safety. When he also then dies Priestley sets out to solve the murders of the Heatherdale brothers using pure logic.

== Bibliography ==
- Evans, Curtis. Masters of the "Humdrum" Mystery: Cecil John Charles Street, Freeman Wills Crofts, Alfred Walter Stewart and the British Detective Novel, 1920-1961. McFarland, 2014.
- Herbert, Rosemary. Whodunit?: A Who's Who in Crime & Mystery Writing. Oxford University Press, 2003.
- Reilly, John M. Twentieth Century Crime & Mystery Writers. Springer, 2015.
