= The Secret Meeting =

1951 detective novel

- First edition (UK)
- Author: John Rhode
- Language: English
- Series: Lancelot Priestley
- Genre: Detective
- Publisher: Geoffrey Bles (UK); Dodd Mead (US)
- Publication date: 1951
- Publication place: United Kingdom
- Media type: Print
- Preceded by: Family Affairs
- Followed by: Doctor Goodwood's Locum

The Secret Meeting is a 1951 detective novel by John Rhode, the pen name of the British writer Cecil Street. It is the fifty second in his long-running series of novels featuring Lancelot Priestley, a Golden Age armchair detective. It was published in America the same year by Dodd Mead. Unusually for the series it has an early Cold War element.

In The New York Times Anthony Boucher felt it was "only for those who enjoy the methodical plodding investigations of Dr. Priestley and Superintendent Waghorn - and even those may find the dénouement singularly unconvincing." Drexel Drake in the Chicago Sunday Tribune was more positive, considering it as "fascinating as an example of patient detecting, designed especially for admirers of Dr. Priestley’s round table processes of deduction."

== Synopsis ==
The discovery of a seemingly unidentifiable corpse in a shabby block of offices off the Gray's Inn Road in central London inexplicably proves to be linked to the assassination of a member of parliament with secret communist ties on an express train heading northwards.

== Bibliography ==
- Evans, Curtis. Masters of the "Humdrum" Mystery: Cecil John Charles Street, Freeman Wills Crofts, Alfred Walter Stewart and the British Detective Novel, 1920-1961. McFarland, 2014.
- Herbert, Rosemary. Whodunit?: A Who's Who in Crime & Mystery Writing. Oxford University Press, 2003.
- Magill, Frank Northen . Critical Survey of Mystery and Detective Fiction: Authors, Volume 4. Salem Press, 1988.
- Reilly, John M. Twentieth Century Crime & Mystery Writers. Springer, 2015.
