= The Davidson Case =

1929 novel

- First Edition (UK)
- Author: John Rhode
- Language: English
- Series: Lancelot Priestley
- Genre: Detective
- Publisher: Geoffrey Bles (UK); Dodd Mead (US)
- Publication date: 1929
- Publication place: United Kingdom
- Media type: Print
- Preceded by: The House on Tollard Ridge
- Followed by: Peril at Cranbury Hall

The Davidson Case is a 1929 detective novel by John Rhode, the pen name of the British writer Cecil Street. It was the seventh appearance of the armchair detective Lancelot Priestley, who featured in a long-running series of novels during the Golden Age of Detective Fiction. It was published in the United States as Murder at Bratton Grange.

== Bibliography ==
- Evans, Curtis. Masters of the "Humdrum" Mystery: Cecil John Charles Street, Freeman Wills Crofts, Alfred Walter Stewart and the British Detective Novel, 1920-1961. McFarland, 2014.
- Herbert, Rosemary. Whodunit?: A Who's Who in Crime & Mystery Writing. Oxford University Press, 2003.
- Reilly, John M. Twentieth Century Crime & Mystery Writers. Springer, 2015.
