= Death in Wellington Road =

1952 novel

- Author: John Rhode
- Language: English
- Series: Lancelot Priestley
- Genre: Detective
- Publisher: Geoffrey Bles (UK); Dodd Mead (US)
- Publication date: 1952
- Publication place: United Kingdom
- Media type: Print
- Preceded by: Death at the Dance
- Followed by: Death at the Inn

Death in Wellington Road is a 1952 mystery detective novel by John Rhode, the pen name of the British writer Cecil Street. It is the fifty fifth in his long-running series of novels featuring Lancelot Priestley, a Golden Age armchair detective. It was published in America the same year by Dodd Mead. A review in The New Yorker considered it "Not exactly inspired, but still a solid and conscientious job.".

== Synopsis ==
After a man is found gassed to death in a Cornish coastal resort, Superintendent Jimmy Waghorn takes up the case with the long-distance assistance of his mentor Doctor Priestley in London. Priestley is able to cast doubt on the police's view that the dead man's young housekeeper, now missing, is responsible for the crime.

== Bibliography ==
- Evans, Curtis. Masters of the "Humdrum" Mystery: Cecil John Charles Street, Freeman Wills Crofts, Alfred Walter Stewart and the British Detective Novel, 1920-1961. McFarland, 2014.
- Herbert, Rosemary. Whodunit?: A Who's Who in Crime & Mystery Writing. Oxford University Press, 2003.
- Magill, Frank Northen . Critical Survey of Mystery and Detective Fiction: Authors, Volume 4. Salem Press, 1988.
- Reilly, John M. Twentieth Century Crime & Mystery Writers. Springer, 2015.
