= Murder at Lilac Cottage =

1940 novel

- American first edition
- Author: John Rhode
- Language: English
- Series: Lancelot Priestley
- Genre: Detective
- Publisher: Collins (UK); Dodd Mead (US)
- Publication date: 1940
- Publication place: United Kingdom
- Media type: Print
- Preceded by: Death on the Boat Train
- Followed by: Death at the Helm

Murder at Lilac Cottage is a 1940 detective novel by John Rhode, the pen name of the British writer Cecil Street. It is the thirty third in his long-running series of novels featuring Lancelot Priestley, a Golden Age armchair detective. In the Times Literary Supplement reviewer Maurice Willson Disher noted "With both ingenuity and originality at command, he will keep puzzle-solvers guessing until it pleases Dr. Priestley to explain why clues are not what they seem." At the same time, Ralph Partridge gave it a broadly positive review in the New Statesman.

== Synopsis ==
In a largely peaceful village in England during the early stages of the Second World War the body of the young man who owns Lilac Cottage is found dead. The only clue that the investigating officers of Scotland Yard can find is a five pound note, but it lures Priestley to the trail. A second murder takes place nearby soon afterwards, puzzling to most, but to Priestley it confirms the theory he is already developing.

== Bibliography ==
- Herbert, Rosemary. Whodunit?: A Who's Who in Crime & Mystery Writing. Oxford University Press, 2003.
- Magill, Frank Northen . Critical Survey of Mystery and Detective Fiction: Authors, Volume 4. Salem Press, 1988.
- Reilly, John M. Twentieth Century Crime & Mystery Writers. Springer, 2015.
