= The Secret of High Eldersham =

1930 novel

- First edition (US)
- Author: Cecil Street
- Language: English
- Series: Desmond Merrion
- Genre: Detective
- Publisher: Collins (UK); Mystery League (US)
- Publication date: 1930
- Publication place: United Kingdom
- Media type: Print
- Followed by: The Menace on the Downs

The Secret of High Eldersham is a 1930 detective novel by Miles Burton, the pen name of the British writer Cecil Street. It was the first novel in a lengthy series featuring the detective Desmond Merrion. Street was one of the most prolific authors of the Golden Age of Detective Fiction and had already enjoyed success with his Doctor Priestley series, written under the name of John Rhode. In 1931 it was published in the United States by the Mystery League under the altered title The Mystery of High Eldersham. Originally published in Britain by the Collins Crime Club, it was reissued in 2016 by British Library Publishing as part of a series of crime novels the Golden Age.

== Bibliography ==
- Evans, Curtis. Masters of the "Humdrum" Mystery: Cecil John Charles Street, Freeman Wills Crofts, Alfred Walter Stewart and the British Detective Novel, 1920-1961. McFarland, 2014.
- Herbert, Rosemary. Whodunit?: A Who's Who in Crime & Mystery Writing. Oxford University Press, 2003.
- Reilly, John M. Twentieth Century Crime & Mystery Writers. Springer, 2015.
