= Bricklayer's Arms (novel) =

1945 novel

- First edition (UK)
- Author: John Rhode
- Language: English
- Series: Lancelot Priestley
- Genre: Detective
- Publisher: Collins Crime Club (UK); Dodd Mead (US)
- Publication date: 1945
- Publication place: United Kingdom
- Media type: Print
- Preceded by: Vegetable Duck
- Followed by: The Lake House

Bricklayer's Arms is a 1945 detective novel by John Rhode, the pen name of the British writer Cecil Street. It is the forty first in his long-running series of novels featuring Lancelot Priestley, a Golden Age armchair detective. It was published in America by Dodd Mead under the alternative title Shadow of a Crime. It was particularly notable for the lesser role played by Priestley, with the case being solved largely by Inspector Waghorn of Scotland Yard alone.

== Synopsis ==
A local village deliveryman comes across the body of an estate agent near a railway bridge, apparently the victim of a motorcycle accident. Subsequent investigation reveals he was killed and suspicion turns towards the dead man's boss. A mysterious bricklayer seen in the vicinity may also have some vital clue to solve the case.

== Bibliography ==
- Herbert, Rosemary. Whodunit?: A Who's Who in Crime & Mystery Writing. Oxford University Press, 2003.
- Magill, Frank Northen . Critical Survey of Mystery and Detective Fiction: Authors, Volume 4. Salem Press, 1988.
- Reilly, John M. Twentieth Century Crime & Mystery Writers. Springer, 2015.
