= Shot at Dawn =

1934 novel

- First edition (UK)
- Author: John Rhode
- Language: English
- Series: Lancelot Priestley
- Genre: Detective
- Publisher: Collins (UK); Dodd Mead (US)
- Publication date: 1934
- Publication place: United Kingdom
- Media type: Print
- Preceded by: Poison for One
- Followed by: The Corpse in the Car

Shot at Dawn is a 1934 detective novel by John Rhode, the pen name of the British writer Cecil Street. It is the nineteenth in his long-running series of novels featuring Lancelot Priestley, a Golden Age armchair detective.

== Synopsis ==
A motor boat Alandra arrives one evening in Riddinghithe and anchors in the harbour bay. In the morning a passing fisherman discovers a body lying on top of the cabin. The local police call in Scotland Yard and Inspector Hanslet arrives to investigate but is unable to discover anything more about the dead man other than his name and his interest in yachting. He is forced once again to turn to the assistance of Priestley.

== Reception ==
Shot at Dawn was one of the best-received novels in the series. In a review for the Sunday Times, the novelist and critic Dorothy L. Sayers wrote "Mr. John Rhode is one of those kind, thoughtful writers who patiently explain all the technical points of the narrative in words that a child could understand."

Ralph Partridge in the New Statesman observed "Shot At Dawn is developed in that incalculable way which keeps one’s attention at the stretch, until the very last page—I actually got a thrill out of the verdict of the jury! The Crime Club has selected the book, and I certainly could not better their selection from the detective novels that have come my way in the last few months."

== Bibliography ==
- Evans, Curtis. Masters of the "Humdrum" Mystery: Cecil John Charles Street, Freeman Wills Crofts, Alfred Walter Stewart and the British Detective Novel, 1920-1961. McFarland, 2014.
- Herbert, Rosemary. Whodunit?: A Who's Who in Crime & Mystery Writing. Oxford University Press, 2003.
- Reilly, John M. Twentieth Century Crime & Mystery Writers. Springer, 2015.
