= Proceed with Caution =

1937 novel

- First edition (UK)
- Author: John Rhode
- Language: English
- Series: Lancelot Priestley
- Genre: Detective
- Publisher: Collins (UK); Dodd Mead (US)
- Publication date: 1937
- Publication place: United Kingdom
- Media type: Print
- Preceded by: Death on the Board
- Followed by: Invisible Weapons

Proceed with Caution is a 1937 detective novel by John Rhode, the pen name of the British writer Cecil Street. It is the twenty-seventh in his long-running series of novels featuring Lancelot Priestley, a Golden Age armchair detective. It was published in the United States the same year by Dodd Mead under the alternative title Body Unidentified.

== Synopsis ==
Superintendent Hanslet and Inspector Waghorn of Scotland Yard respectively investigate a diamond robbery and a suspicious death. A consignment of valuable jewels have gone missing while being transported from Hatton Garden. Meanwhile a corpse is found in a tar burner in a Kent village, completely unrecognisable. It takes the genius of Dr. Priestley to demonstrate how these two events are linked.

== Literary significance ==
E.R. Punshon writing in The Guardian felt " If only Mr. Rhode were a little more careful with his characterisation, if only his literary style were a little less pedestrian, he would take an even higher place than that his persistent—and consistent—ingenuity has won for him."

== Bibliography ==
- Evans, Curtis. Masters of the "Humdrum" Mystery: Cecil John Charles Street, Freeman Wills Crofts, Alfred Walter Stewart and the British Detective Novel, 1920-1961. McFarland, 2014.
- Magill, Frank Northen . Critical Survey of Mystery and Detective Fiction: Authors, Volume 3. Salem Press, 1988.
- Reilly, John M. Twentieth Century Crime & Mystery Writers. Springer, 2015.
