= Men Die at Cyprus Lodge =

1943 novel

- American first edition
- Author: John Rhode
- Language: English
- Series: Lancelot Priestley
- Genre: Detective
- Publisher: Collins (UK); Dodd Mead (US)
- Publication date: 1943
- Publication place: United Kingdom
- Media type: Print
- Preceded by: Dead on the Track
- Followed by: Death Invades the Meeting

Men Die at Cyprus Lodge is a 1943 detective novel by John Rhode, the pen name of the British writer Cecil Street. It is the thirty-eighth in his long-running series of novels featuring Lancelot Priestley, a Golden Age armchair detective. Reviewing it for the San Francisco Chronicle, Anthony Boucher wrote "at his best, nobody can touch Rhode for ingenious murder gadgets and very few can top him for meticulous unravelling; he's very close his best in this one".

== Synopsis ==
Cyprus Lodge is a reportedly haunted house in the English countryside that has remained unoccupied for many years. Ghost hunter Sir Philip Briningham is fascinated by the nineteenth-century building, but his violent death adds to the rumours about the house. It draws the interest of Scotland Yard, and particularly Priestley, who becomes convinced that Briningham's death and several others were at the hands of a very human murderer.

== Bibliography ==
- Evans, Curtis. Masters of the "Humdrum" Mystery: Cecil John Charles Street, Freeman Wills Crofts, Alfred Walter Stewart and the British Detective Novel, 1920-1961. McFarland, 2014.
- Magill, Frank Northen . Critical Survey of Mystery and Detective Fiction: Authors, Volume 3. Salem Press, 1988.
- Reilly, John M. Twentieth Century Crime & Mystery Writers. Springer, 2015.
