= Poison for One =

1934 novel

- First edition (UK)
- Author: John Rhode
- Language: English
- Series: Lancelot Priestley
- Genre: Detective
- Publisher: Collins Crime Club (UK); Dodd Mead (US)
- Publication date: 1934
- Publication place: United Kingdom
- Media type: Print
- Preceded by: The Robthorne Mystery
- Followed by: Shot at Dawn

Poison for One is a 1934 detective novel by John Rhode, the pen name of the British writer Cecil Street. It is the eighteenth in his long-running series of novels featuring Lancelot Priestley, a Golden Age armchair detective. It combines elements of the locked room mystery and country house mystery.

== Synopsis ==
The weekend guests of the financier Sir Gerald Uppingham at his country estate Bucklesbury Park break into his locked study and discover his corpse, dead of prussic acid. Inspector Hanslet of Scotland Yard is called in, but as usual, he is forced to turn to Priestley to fully solve the complex question of how and why Uppingham died and who killed him.

== Reception ==
Reviewing the book in the Sunday Times leading crime writer Dorothy L. Sayers considered it "as usual, sound, pleasantly written, and entertaining" although, she complained the book "was rather spoilt for me by the jacket, which deliberately gives away one-half of the solution."

== Bibliography ==
- Evans, Curtis. Masters of the "Humdrum" Mystery: Cecil John Charles Street, Freeman Wills Crofts, Alfred Walter Stewart and the British Detective Novel, 1920-1961. McFarland, 2014.
- Herbert, Rosemary. Whodunit?: A Who's Who in Crime & Mystery Writing. Oxford University Press, 2003.
- Reilly, John M. Twentieth Century Crime & Mystery Writers. Springer, 2015.
