= Mystery at Olympia =

1935 novel

- First edition
- Author: John Rhode
- Language: English
- Series: Lancelot Priestley
- Genre: Detective
- Publisher: [[Collins Crime Club]] (UK); Dodd Mead (US)
- Publication date: 1935
- Publication place: United Kingdom
- Media type: Print
- Preceded by: Hendon's First Case
- Followed by: Death at Breakfast

Mystery at Olympia is a 1935 detective novel by John Rhode, the pen name of the British writer Cecil Street. It is the twenty second in his long-running series of novels featuring Lancelot Priestley, an armchair detective who was able to solve mysteries without visiting the scene of the crime. It was published in the United States under the alternative title Murder at the Motor Show.

== Synopsis ==
At the annual Motor Show held at London's Olympia, great excitement surrounds the unveiling of the new much anticipated new Comet car. However, when one of the spectators falls dead with no visible sign of the reason for his death, the causes an even greater sensation. Scotland Yard's Superintendent Hanslet is baffled, but Priestley takes up the case with his usual logic.

== Bibliography ==
- Evans, Curtis. Masters of the "Humdrum" Mystery: Cecil John Charles Street, Freeman Wills Crofts, Alfred Walter Stewart and the British Detective Novel, 1920-1961. McFarland, 2014.
- Herbert, Rosemary. Whodunit?: A Who's Who in Crime & Mystery Writing. Oxford University Press, 2003.
- Reilly, John M. Twentieth Century Crime & Mystery Writers. Springer, 2015.
