= The Motor Rally Mystery =

1933 novel

- First Edition (UK)
- Author: John Rhode
- Language: English
- Series: Lancelot Priestley
- Genre: Detective
- Publisher: Collins Crime Club (UK); Dodd Mead (US)
- Publication date: 1933
- Publication place: United Kingdom
- Media type: Print
- Preceded by: Dead Men at the Folly
- Followed by: The Claverton Mystery

The Motor Rally Mystery is a 1933 detective novel by John Rhode, the pen name of the British writer Cecil Street. It is the fourteenth in his long-running series of novels featuring Lancelot Priestley, a Golden Age armchair detective. It was published in the United States by Dodd Mead under the alternative title Dr. Priestley Lays a Trap. It takes place against the backdrop of the real life RAC Motor Rally, which concluded at Torquay.

Reviewing the novel in The Spectator Dilys Powell concluded "Dr. Priestley, as usual takes nothing on trust; and Mr. Rhode achieves a pretty piece of deduction." In the New York Times Isaac Anderson felt "this story is one of the best of the Priestley series, and that is no faint praise."

== Synopsis ==
During an overnight thousand mile motor rally an accident to one of the cars leads to the death of the two occupants. The local police are far from convinced that everything is above board and call in Scotland Yard. Inspector Hanslet leads the case but the real work is done by the criminologist Priestley, who retraces the entire journey of care in order to solve the mystery.

== Bibliography ==
- Evans, Curtis. Masters of the "Humdrum" Mystery: Cecil John Charles Street, Freeman Wills Crofts, Alfred Walter Stewart and the British Detective Novel, 1920-1961. McFarland, 2014.
- Herbert, Rosemary. Whodunit?: A Who's Who in Crime & Mystery Writing. Oxford University Press, 2003. ISBN 978-0-19-515761-1.
- Reilly, John M. Twentieth Century Crime & Mystery Writers. Springer, 2015.
