= The Venner Crime =

1933 novel

- First Edition (UK)
- Author: John Rhode
- Language: English
- Series: Lancelot Priestley
- Genre: Detective
- Publisher: Odhams Press (UK); Dodd Mead (US)
- Publication date: 1933
- Publication place: United Kingdom
- Media type: Print
- Preceded by: The Claverton Mystery
- Followed by: The Robthorne Mystery

The Venner Crime is a 1933 detective novel by John Rhode, the pen name of the British writer Cecil Street. It is the sixteenth in his long-running series of novels featuring Lancelot Priestley, a Golden Age armchair detective. In Britain it was published by Odhams Press, the only one of his works be done so, while in the United States it was handled by his usual publisher Dodd Mead. It has been described as a sort of sequel to his previous book The Claverton Mystery. Writing in the New York Times Isaac Anderson considered "This is not one of the best of the Dr. Priestley yarns, but it is plenty good enough to pass an idle evening."

== Synopsis ==
A wealthy and grumpy 60-year-old man, Denis Hinchliffe, died after exhibiting symptoms of tetanus (“He suffered from violent spasms, muscle contractions, an arched back, etc.”). Dr. Oldland, called in at the last minute, did not issue a death certificate, suspecting that the death might have been caused by a poison strychnine, but the case was ruled an accidental death after the autopsy revealed that “there was no trace of strychnine or any other poison. Tetanus was the only other possibility.” His nephew, Ernest Venner, inherited his uncle’s entire fortune after Hinchcliffe had recently amended his will in his favor. The former will was going to leave everything to Christine Venner, his niece and Ernest’s sister. Immediately after receiving the entire sum, Ernest Venner gave a check for an amount sufficient to cover a very large bill and disappeared the next day. Superintendent Hanslett of Scotland Yard, Sir Alured Faversham, a prominent pathologist who performed Hinchcliffe’s autopsy and a friend of Dr. Priestley, as well as Dr. Oldland, a general practitioner who was called to Hinchcliffe’s bedside, in an emergency, meet regularly at Priestley’s to share a glass of sherry and cigars and discuss the mysterious disappearance of Ernest Venner. But time passes, and Venner does not reappear...

== Bibliography ==
- Evans, Curtis. Masters of the "Humdrum" Mystery: Cecil John Charles Street, Freeman Wills Crofts, Alfred Walter Stewart and the British Detective Novel, 1920-1961. McFarland, 2014.
- Herbert, Rosemary. Whodunit?: A Who's Who in Crime & Mystery Writing. Oxford University Press, 2003.
- Reilly, John M. Twentieth Century Crime & Mystery Writers. Springer, 2015.
