= The Bloody Tower =

1938 novel

- First edition (UK)
- Author: John Rhode
- Language: English
- Series: Lancelot Priestley
- Genre: Detective
- Publisher: Collins (UK); Dodd Mead (US)
- Publication date: 1938
- Publication place: United Kingdom
- Media type: Print
- Preceded by: Invisible Weapons
- Followed by: Death Pays a Dividend

The Bloody Tower is a 1938 detective novel by John Rhode, the pen name of the British writer Cecil Street. It is the twenty ninth in his long-running series of novels featuring Lancelot Priestley, a Golden Age armchair detective. It was published in the United States the same year by Dodd Mead under the alternative title Tower of Evil. It is notable among Rhode's more realistic style during the series, for its Gothic elements. For The Guardian E. R. Punshon wrote "in The Bloody Tower Mr. John Rhode gives another excellent example of his eminently satisfactory and solid talent."

== Synopsis ==
The crumbling Farningcote Priory has been the home of the Glapthorne family for generations. In the grounds stand a tower, built as a folly during the eighteenth century which seems to have a strange, almost mystical power over the family. When Caleb Clapthorne is killed in what at first appears to be a shooting accident, it soon proves to be murder. Yet Inspector Waghorn, in the area on the trail of a gang of thieves but called in to assist, fails to find any obvious motive. In the end he turns to Priestley to track down the vital clues.

== Bibliography ==
- Evans, Curtis. Masters of the "Humdrum" Mystery: Cecil John Charles Street, Freeman Wills Crofts, Alfred Walter Stewart and the British Detective Novel, 1920–1961. McFarland, 2014.
- Magill, Frank Northen . Critical Survey of Mystery and Detective Fiction: Authors, Volume 3. Salem Press, 1988.
- Reilly, John M. Twentieth Century Crime & Mystery Writers. Springer, 2015.
