= Mademoiselle from Armentières =

English song

"Mademoiselle from Armentières" (Roud 4703) is an English song that was particularly popular during World War I. It is also known by its ersatz French hook line, "Inky Pinky Parlez Vous", or the American variant "Hinky Dinky Parlez-vous" (variant: Parlay voo).

== Origins ==
"Mademoiselle from Armentières" has roots in a tradition of older popular songs. Its immediate predecessor seems to be the song "Skiboo", or "Snapoo", which was popular among British soldiers of World War I.

The Pittsburgh Post-Gazette of December 4, 1939, reported that the historical inspiration for the song had been a young Frenchwoman named Marie Lecoq, later Marie Marceau, who worked as a waitress at the Café de la Paix in Armentières during the war. Despite the obscenity of many popular versions of the song, it was reportedly quite clean in its original form.

The song's first known recording was made in 1915, by music hall baritone Jack Charman.

The song "Mademoiselle from Armentieres", as known in World War I may have been written by Cecil H. Winter in 1915 and 1916, during his time in England and France fighting with the New Zealanders. He was Australian, having been raised in the Riverina region of New South Wales. He was to take Riverina for his writings of Australian bush poetry culminating in the writing of a book of such poetry (The Story of Bidgee Queen & Other Verses, Century Books, 1929). From a young age he wrote for the Australian Bulletin Magazine. He emigrated to New Zealand prior to World War I, living in Bluff, Southland, New Zealand.

== Use ==
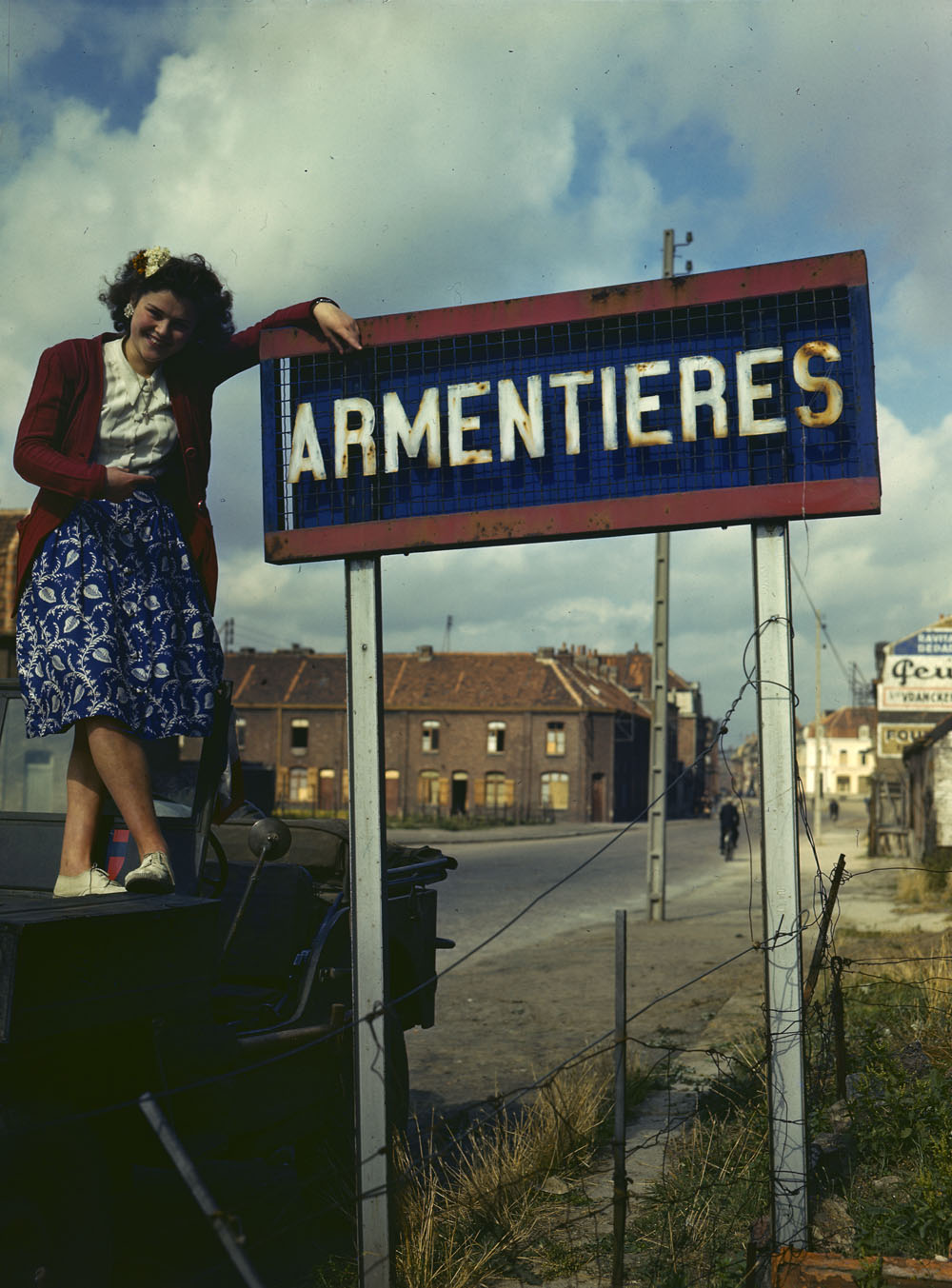
A 1944 colour photograph of a woman standing on a Canadian Army jeep, by the town sign at Armentières

"Mademoiselle from Armentières" was considered a risqué song and not for 'polite company'. When sung on the radio and TV, as in The Waltons, typically only the first verse was sung. The lyrics on which this opinion is based are recorded in the Gordon "Inferno" Collection.

It is the third part of the regimental march of Princess Patricia's Canadian Light Infantry. The first two are "Has Anyone Seen the Colonel?" and "It's a Long Way to Tipperary".

Mademoiselle from Armentières was the name of a 1926 British film directed by Maurice Elvey and starring Estelle Brody.

Mademoiselle From Armentieres was the title of a 1927 espionage, thriller novel by Cecil Street, writing under the name John Rhode.

During World War II the comic duo Flanagan and Allen had a hit with "If a Grey Haired Lady Says 'How's Your Father?' (That's Mademoiselle from Armentieres)", written by Ted Waite, which refers to the original song.

When Lindisfarne played their song "We Can Swing Together" on stage in the early 1970s, it developed into a lengthy harmonica medley which included a verse and chorus from this as well as several other songs, some also traditional.

"Three German Officers Crossed the Rhine" is a song with a much more ribald set of lyrics, popular on rugby tours but sung to the same tune or to that of "When Johnny Comes Marching Home". It was originally sung in the allied trenches during the First World War.

A reworked version known as the "fart song" or as "an old lady of 92" was popular in schools, particularly in the UK, with lyrics celebrating a flatulent journey including Bristol and Rome.

A reworked version of the melody was used in the Israeli songwriter Haim Hefer's song "בחולות" ("Bacholot" or "Bakholot", "In the Sands"), best known for its performance by the singer Yossi Banai. The song consist of six stanzas telling of a tendency among the narrator's family males to take out the beloveds into, and conceive their children in, the titular sands.

In America, most recognize the melody with completely different lyrics, as the theme song for the character Clarabell the Clown on the children's TV series Howdy Doody.

== Lyrics ==
Multiple versions of the song exist. One variation goes as follows:

Mademoiselle from Armentieres, Parley-voo?
Mademoiselle from Armentieres, Parley-voo?
Mademoiselle from Armentieres,
She hasn't been kissed in forty years,
Hinky, dinky, parley-voo.

Mademoiselle from Armentieres, Parley-voo?
Mademoiselle from Armentieres, Parley-voo?
She had the form like the back of a hack,
When she cried the tears ran down her back,
Hinky, dinky, parley-voo.

Mademoiselle from Armentieres, Parley-voo?
Mademoiselle from Armentieres, Parley-voo?
She never could hold the love of man
'Cause she took her baths in a talcum can,
Hinky, dinky, parley-voo.

Mademoiselle from Armentieres, Parley-voo?
Mademoiselle from Armentieres, Parley-voo?
She had four chins, her knees would knock,
And her face would stop a cuckoo clock,
Hinky, dinky, parley-voo.

Mademoiselle from Armentieres, Parley-voo?
Mademoiselle from Armentieres, Parley-voo?
She could beg a franc, a drink, a meal,
But it wasn't because of sex appeal,
Hinky, dinky, parley-voo.

Mademoiselle from Armentieres, Parley-voo?
Mademoiselle from Armentieres, Parley-voo?
She could guzzle a barrel of sour wine,
And eat a hog without peeling the rind,
Hinky, dinky, parley-voo.

The MPs think they won the war, Parley-voo.
The MPs think they won the war, Parley-voo.
The MPs think they won the war,
Standing guard at the café door,
Hinky, dinky, parley-voo.

The officers get the pie and cake, Parley-voo.
The officers get the pie and cake, Parley-voo.
The officers get the pie and cake,
And all we get is the bellyache,
Hinky, dinky, parley-voo.

Mademoiselle from Armentieres, Parley-voo?
Mademoiselle from Armentieres, Parley-voo?
They say they mechanized the war
So what the hell are we marching for?
Hinky-dinky, parley-voo.

The sergeant ought to take a bath, Parley-voo.
The sergeant ought to take a bath, Parley-voo.
If he changes his underwear
The frogs will give him the Croix-de-Guerre,
Hinky-dinky, parley-voo.

You might forget the gas and shells, Parley-voo.
You might forget the gas and shells, Parley-voo.
You might forget the groans and yells
But you'll never forget the mademoiselles,
Hinky, dinky, parley-voo.

Mademoiselle from Armentieres, Parley-voo?
Mademoiselle from Armentieres, Parley-voo?
Many and many a married man
Wants to go back to France again
Hinky, dinky, parley-voo.

Mademoiselle from Armentieres, Parley-voo?
Mademoiselle from Armentieres, Parley-voo?
Just blow your nose, and dry your tears,
We'll all be back in a few short years,
Hinky, dinky, parley-voo.

== Lyricists ==
There are several claims to having written the lyrics for this song:

- Edward Rowland and a Canadian composer, Gitz Rice
- Harry Carlton and Joe Tunbridge
- British songwriter Harry Wincott
