= Vegetable Duck =

1944 novel

- First edition (UK)
- Author: John Rhode
- Language: English
- Series: Lancelot Priestley
- Genre: Detective
- Publisher: Collins Crime Club (UK); Dodd Mead (US)
- Publication date: 1944
- Publication place: United Kingdom
- Media type: Print
- Preceded by: Death Invades the Meeting
- Followed by: Bricklayer's Arms

Vegetable Duck is a 1944 detective novel by John Rhode, the pen name of the British writer Cecil Street. It is the fortieth in his long-running series of novels featuring Lancelot Priestley, a Golden Age armchair detective. The title refers to a dish including a Marrow stuffed with minced beef, which features in the plot. It has been described as "one of the oddest titles for a detective novel in the genre". Although written during wartime, the setting was post-war. It was published in America by Dodd Mead under the alternative title Too Many Suspects.

== Synopsis ==
At the London service flat where she lives with her husband, dies after eating a meal which later analysis shows was infused with digitalis. Scotland Yard at first suspect her husband, who had been called away by a telephone call of murdering her. However, with the assistance of Priestley, the investigating officer is able to prove this is a long-premeditated crime by someone else.

== Bibliography ==
- Herbert, Rosemary. Whodunit?: A Who's Who in Crime & Mystery Writing. Oxford University Press, 2003.
- Magill, Frank Northen . Critical Survey of Mystery and Detective Fiction: Authors, Volume 4. Salem Press, 1988.
- Reilly, John M. Twentieth Century Crime & Mystery Writers. Springer, 2015.
