= Death Invades the Meeting =

1944 novel

- American first edition
- Author: John Rhode
- Language: English
- Series: Lancelot Priestley
- Genre: Detective
- Publisher: Collins (UK); Dodd Mead (US)
- Publication date: 1944
- Publication place: United Kingdom
- Media type: Print
- Preceded by: Men Die at Cyprus Lodge
- Followed by: Vegetable Duck

Death Invades the Meeting is a 1944 detective novel by John Rhode, the pen name of the British writer Cecil Street. It is the thirty ninth in his long-running series of novels featuring Lancelot Priestley, a Golden Age armchair detective. Reviewing the novel for the Times Literary Supplement Maurice Willson Disher noted "His ingenuity is becoming as delicate to handle as high explosive. His stories may become so difficult to review without saying too much that his triumph will come when they cannot, for discretion’s sake, be reviewed at all."

== Synopsis ==
The story takes place during the Second World War in the village of Heringworth, where John Garstairs calls a meeting of the Invasion Committee - designed to take measures to prevent a German invasion. However, when one of the members dies during the meeting, it draws the interest of Priestley who deduces that a murder has been committed.

== Bibliography ==
- Evans, Curtis. Masters of the "Humdrum" Mystery: Cecil John Charles Street, Freeman Wills Crofts, Alfred Walter Stewart and the British Detective Novel, 1920-1961. McFarland, 2014.
- Herbert, Rosemary. Whodunit?: A Who's Who in Crime & Mystery Writing. Oxford University Press, 2003.
- Magill, Frank Northen . Critical Survey of Mystery and Detective Fiction: Authors, Volume 4. Salem Press, 1988.
- Reilly, John M. Twentieth Century Crime & Mystery Writers. Springer, 2015.
