= Death in the Tunnel =

1936 novel

- First edition (UK)
- Author: Cecil Street
- Language: English
- Series: Desmond Merrion
- Genre: Detective
- Publisher: Collins Crime Club (UK); Doubleday (US)
- Publication date: 1936
- Publication place: United Kingdom
- Media type: Print
- Preceded by: Where is Barbara Prentice?
- Followed by: Murder of a Chemist

Death in the Tunnel is a 1936 detective novel by the British writer Cecil Street, writing under the pen name of Miles Burton. It is the thirteenth in a series of books featuring the amateur detective Desmond Merrion and Inspector Arnold of Scotland Yard. It was published in the United States by Doubleday the same year under the alternative title Dark is the Tunnel. Originally published by Collins Crime Club, it was reissued in 2016 by the British Library Publishing as part of a group of crime novels from the Golden Age of Detective Fiction. It is part of a subgenre of novels where murders take place on railway lines including the same author's Tragedy on the Line and Dead on the Track

== Synopsis ==
Noted city businessman Sir Wilfred Saxonby catches his usual train from Cannon Street for Stourford. As the train enters the long Blackdown Tunnel, the driver catches sight of a red light signalling danger in the tunnel and slows the train, before it stops the light turns to green and the train picks up speed again. It is then the guard discovers that Saxonby is dead, alone in his compartment. When they reach the next stop, the stationmaster deduces that he has been shot by a pistol. Scotland Yard is called in. Arnold at first concurs with the local force that is a case of suicide, but several things intrigue him. Sir Wilfred's behaviour that day had been unusual but not suicidal, his ticket cannot be found anywhere and there were no scheduled railway workers supposed to be the tunnel to stop the train with the light.

Calling in Merrion's assistance, they conclude that this was a case of murder. A journey on foot through the long and dark tunnel draws their attention to a ventilation shaft halfway down which seems to have played a vital role in the escape of the murderer after he had jumped off the train when it slowed down as well as providing the ghostly light the driver saw. Their hunt for clues takes them in pursuit of a breakdown truck and a duplicate wallet to Sir Wilfred's, a search that leads them as far afield as Plymouth and Manchester until they are at last able to build up a picture of the elaborate scheme planned by the killers.

== Bibliography ==
- Evans, Curtis. Masters of the "Humdrum" Mystery: Cecil John Charles Street, Freeman Wills Crofts, Alfred Walter Stewart and the British Detective Novel, 1920-1961. McFarland, 2014.
- Herbert, Rosemary. Whodunit?: A Who's Who in Crime & Mystery Writing. Oxford University Press, 2003.
- Reilly, John M. Twentieth Century Crime & Mystery Writers. Springer, 2015.
