= Herbert Sutherland =

Herbert Warren Sutherland (26 December 1917 – 1981) was an English author, broadcaster and lecturer. He was born in South Shields in 1917 and his father was a Shetland sea captain. He was educated at Westoe Secondary School and Durham University. He lived in High Heaton, Newcastle upon Tyne, and worked as a deputy headmaster in a Newcastle secondary modern school and then as a lecturer at Newcastle Polytechnic.

Herbert Sutherland had many short stories published, one of which won a prize in a competition held by The Observer. He also wrote for broadcasting in radio and television.

His publications included: The Ambassadors, 1948; Echoes from Ossian, 1949; Fiddle Me Free, 1958; Best Out of Three, 1960; A Case of Knives, 1964; Magnie, 1967.

Fiddle me Free was published in hard cover by Putnam & Co Ltd of England in 1958 with a Corgi Edition in paperback published in 1959. At last it can be told - How in Persia in 1942 Big Oley, Taff and Alfie were solely responsible for the great Victory of the Bacon, and how incidentally the Colonel got his trousers stolen, with assistance from Big Fatima, a humble toiler in the local entertainment industry. All this in spite of the awful obstacles the three had to face. The Colonel, the Padre, and the RSM…

Best Out of Three was published by Geoffrey Bles Ltd of 52 Doughty Street, London WC1 in 1960 and was printed by Cox and Wyman Ltd of Fakenham in hard cover with a dust jacket. This book won the Northern Arts Award in 1966.

A Case of Knives was also published by Bles in 1964 and also printed by Cox & Wyman in hard cover with a dust jacket.

On page 24 of A Case of Knives he mentions (probably autobiographically) that his first novel was a cynical army farce about a group of privates dedicated to getting out of the army and goes on to say that he had started a sequel with the same bunch teaching in a secondary modern school but the lack of enthusiasm with which the first novel had been received by the publishers had inclined him to the view that his brand of humour was not universal and consequently he had ditched the sequel.

Magnie, with the same publisher and printer, in hard cover with a dust jacket came out in 1967.

He also appeared in The filmed element of an edition of the Tyne Tees Television programme Access - Herbie Sutherland.
