= Death at Breakfast =

1936 novel

- First edition
- Author: John Rhode
- Language: English
- Series: Lancelot Priestley
- Genre: Detective
- Publisher: Collins Crime Club (UK); Dodd Mead (US)
- Publication date: 1936
- Publication place: United Kingdom
- Media type: Print
- Preceded by: Mystery at Olympia
- Followed by: In Face of the Verdict

Death at Breakfast is a 1936 detective novel by John Rhode, the pen name of the British writer Cecil Street. It is the twenty third in his long-running series of novels featuring Lancelot Priestley, a Golden Age armchair detective. It received a negative review from Cecil Day-Lewis, writing as Nicholas Blake in The Spectator noting "Some attempt is made to establish the character of the victim, but the remaining dramatis personae are stuffed men".

== Synopsis ==
Victor Harleston is apparently poisoned at the breakfast table after drinking a cup of coffee. Its connection to two other crimes are not at first established by the investigating Scotland Yard officers and it falls to Professor Priestley to crack the case.

== Bibliography ==
- Evans, Curtis. Masters of the "Humdrum" Mystery: Cecil John Charles Street, Freeman Wills Crofts, Alfred Walter Stewart and the British Detective Novel, 1920-1961. McFarland, 2014.
- Herbert, Rosemary. Whodunit?: A Who's Who in Crime & Mystery Writing. Oxford University Press, 2003.
- Reilly, John M. Twentieth Century Crime & Mystery Writers. Springer, 2015.
