= The Robthorne Mystery =

1934 novel

- First Edition (UK)
- Author: John Rhode
- Language: English
- Series: Lancelot Priestley
- Genre: Detective fiction
- Publisher: Collins Crime Club (UK); Dodd Mead (US)
- Publication date: 1934
- Publication place: United Kingdom
- Media type: Print
- Preceded by: The Venner Crime
- Followed by: Poison for One

The Robthorne Mystery is a 1934 detective novel by John Rhode, the pen name of the British writer Cecil Street. It is the seventeenth in his long-running series of novels featuring Lancelot Priestley, a Golden Age armchair detective. It was published in the United States the same year by Dodd Mead.

== Synopsis ==
Warwick Robthorne is found dead on Guy Fawkes Night in the greenhouse of his twin brother's country home, apparently having committed suicide. This coincides with a police operation in London led by Inspector Hanslet against a gang of drug smugglers. It falls to the gifted criminologist Dr. Priestley to tie the evidence between the two cases together.

== Literary significance ==
Reviewing the book for The Sunday Times, Dorothy L. Sayers wrote, "One always embarks on a John Rhode book with a great feeling of security. One knows that there will be a sound plot, a well-knit process of reasoning, and a solidly satisfying solution with no loose ends or careless errors of fact."

Isaac Anderson in The New York Times remarked that "no one who has ever read a Dr. Priestley story will be surprised to learn that this is a genuinely baffling crime puzzle of the first quality".

== Bibliography ==
- Evans, Curtis. Masters of the "Humdrum" Mystery: Cecil John Charles Street, Freeman Wills Crofts, Alfred Walter Stewart and the British Detective Novel, 1920-1961. McFarland, 2014.
- Herbert, Rosemary. Whodunit?: A Who's Who in Crime & Mystery Writing. Oxford University Press, 2003.
- Reilly, John M. Twentieth Century Crime & Mystery Writers. Springer, 2015.
