= Invisible Weapons =

1938 novel

- First edition
- Author: John Rhode
- Language: English
- Series: Lancelot Priestley
- Genre: Detective
- Publisher: Collins Crime Club (UK); Dodd Mead (US)
- Publication date: 1938
- Publication place: United Kingdom
- Media type: Print
- Preceded by: Proceed with Caution
- Followed by: The Bloody Tower

Invisible Weapons is a 1938 detective novel by John Rhode, the pen name of the British writer Cecil Street. It is the twenty eighth in his long-running series of novels featuring Lancelot Priestley, a Golden Age armchair detective. A locked room mystery, the title revolves around the fact that two murders are committed by apparently invisible methods.

== Synopsis ==
In suburban London, a man named Fransham is found dead after going to wash his hands in his niece's bathroom, an apparently locked room. The circumstances baffle the investigating officers of Scotland Yard until Priestley takes up the case, connecting it with another seemingly unrelated death.

== Bibliography ==
- Evans, Curtis. Masters of the "Humdrum" Mystery: Cecil John Charles Street, Freeman Wills Crofts, Alfred Walter Stewart and the British Detective Novel, 1920-1961. McFarland, 2014.
- Herbert, Rosemary. Whodunit?: A Who's Who in Crime & Mystery Writing. Oxford University Press, 2003.
- Reilly, John M. Twentieth Century Crime & Mystery Writers. Springer, 2015.
