= Night Exercise =

1942 novel

- First edition
- Author: John Rhode
- Language: English
- Genre: Detective
- Publisher: Collins Crime Club (UK); Dodd Mead (US)
- Publication date: 1942
- Publication place: United Kingdom
- Media type: Print

Night Exercise is a 1942 detective novel by John Rhode, the pen name of the British writer Cecil Street. It is a stand-alone wartime novel from Rhode, best known for his long-running series featuring Lancelot Priestley. It was published in America by Dodd Mead under the alternative title Dead of the Night.

== Synopsis ==
During a night exercise the widely disliked businessman and Colonel in the Home Guard Sir Hector Chalgrove disappears. Suspicion falls on one of his subordinates Major Ledbury and he assist police in their hunt for he real killer.

== Bibliography ==
- Evans, Curtis. Masters of the "Humdrum" Mystery: Cecil John Charles Street, Freeman Wills Crofts, Alfred Walter Stewart and the British Detective Novel, 1920-1961. McFarland, 2014.
- Herbert, Rosemary. Whodunit?: A Who's Who in Crime & Mystery Writing. Oxford University Press, 2003.
- Magill, Frank Northen . Critical Survey of Mystery and Detective Fiction: Authors, Volume 4. Salem Press, 1988.
- Reilly, John M. Twentieth Century Crime & Mystery Writers. Springer, 2015.
