= The Claverton Mystery =

1933 novel

- First Edition (US)
- Author: John Rhode
- Language: English
- Series: Lancelot Priestley
- Genre: Detective
- Publisher: Collins (UK); Dodd Mead (US)
- Publication date: 1933
- Publication place: United Kingdom
- Media type: Print
- Preceded by: The Motor Rally Mystery
- Followed by: The Venner Crime

The Claverton Mystery is a 1933 detective novel by John Rhode, the pen name of the British writer Cecil Street. It is the fifteenth in his long-running series of novels featuring Lancelot Priestley, a Golden Age armchair detective. It was published in the United States by Dodd Mead with the altered title The Claverton Affair. The tone of the book has been described as much darker than the author's other novels.

== Synopsis ==
Priestley goes to visit his friend Sir John Claverton at his gloomy house, and shortly afterwards hears that he has died. The dead man's doctor is not convinced it was a natural death, and evidence of poisoning emerges. There are several beneficiaries of the dead man's will.

== Bibliography ==
- Evans, Curtis. Masters of the "Humdrum" Mystery: Cecil John Charles Street, Freeman Wills Crofts, Alfred Walter Stewart and the British Detective Novel, 1920-1961. McFarland, 2014.
- Herbert, Rosemary. Whodunit?: A Who's Who in Crime & Mystery Writing. Oxford University Press, 2003.
- Reilly, John M. Twentieth Century Crime & Mystery Writers. Springer, 2015.
