= In Face of the Verdict =

1936 novel

- First edition
- Author: John Rhode
- Language: English
- Series: Lancelot Priestley
- Genre: Detective
- Publisher: Collins Crime Club (UK); Dodd Mead (US)
- Publication date: 1936
- Publication place: United Kingdom
- Media type: Print
- Preceded by: Death at Breakfast
- Followed by: Death in the Hopfields

In Face of the Verdict is a 1936 detective novel by John Rhode, the pen name of the British writer Cecil Street. It is the twenty fourth in his long-running series of novels featuring Lancelot Priestley, a Golden Age armchair detective. Unusually in the series Priestley takes a more active role in the investigation himself, rather than solving it from a detached distance. It was not published in the United States until 1940, by Dodd Mead, with the slightly altered title of In the Face of the Verdict.

== Synopsis ==
After the inquest in the port town of Blacksand concludes that the death of Major Walter Bedworthy was an accident due to drowning, his friend summons in Priestley due to his belief that it was in fact murder. This proves to be the case when the dead man's brother is also found drowned a few days later. Assisted by Superintendent Hanslet and Inspector Waghorn of Scotland Yard, Priestley sets out to unmask the cunning killer.

== Bibliography ==
- Evans, Curtis. Masters of the "Humdrum" Mystery: Cecil John Charles Street, Freeman Wills Crofts, Alfred Walter Stewart and the British Detective Novel, 1920-1961. McFarland, 2014.
- Herbert, Rosemary. Whodunit?: A Who's Who in Crime & Mystery Writing. Oxford University Press, 2003.
- Reilly, John M. Twentieth Century Crime & Mystery Writers. Springer, 2015.
