= Dead Men at the Folly =

1932 novel

- First Edition (US)
- Author: John Rhode
- Language: English
- Series: Lancelot Priestley
- Genre: Detective
- Publisher: Collins Crime Club (UK); Dodd Mead (US)
- Publication date: 1932
- Publication place: United Kingdom
- Media type: Print
- Preceded by: Mystery at Greycombe Farm
- Followed by: The Motor Rally Mystery

Dead Men at the Folly is a 1932 detective novel by John Rhode, the pen name of the British writer Cecil Street. It is the thirteenth in his long-running series of novels featuring Lancelot Priestley, a Golden Age armchair detective. It was published in the United States by Dodd Mead.

== Synopsis ==
A dead body found at the foot of a large folly draws the attention of Hanslet of Scotland Yard and with him Doctor Priestley.

== Bibliography ==
- Evans, Curtis. Masters of the "Humdrum" Mystery: Cecil John Charles Street, Freeman Wills Crofts, Alfred Walter Stewart and the British Detective Novel, 1920-1961. McFarland, 2014.
- Herbert, Rosemary. Whodunit?: A Who's Who in Crime & Mystery Writing. Oxford University Press, 2003.
- Reilly, John M. Twentieth Century Crime & Mystery Writers. Springer, 2015.
