= Death on the Boat Train =

1940 novel

- First Edition (US)
- Author: John Rhode
- Language: English
- Series: Lancelot Priestley
- Genre: Detective
- Publisher: Collins Crime Club (UK); Dodd Mead (US)
- Publication date: 1940
- Publication place: United Kingdom
- Media type: Print
- Preceded by: Death on Sunday
- Followed by: Murder at Lilac Cottage

Death on the Boat Train is a 1940 detective novel by John Rhode, the pen name of the British writer Cecil Street. It is the thirty second in his long-running series of novels featuring Lancelot Priestley, a Golden Age armchair detective. As in most of the later novels much of the detective footwork is done by Inspector Waghorn of Scotland Yard. The construction of the murder setting bears similarities to Death in the Tunnel, written by Street under his other pen name Miles Burton. With its focus on seemingly unbreakable alibis and railway and ship timetables, it is also similar in style to the Inspector French novels of Freeman Wills Crofts.

== Synopsis ==
A passenger in a private compartment on the boat train from Southampton to London Waterloo is found dead with a needle puncture in is back. He had travelled on Guernsey on a channel steamer but investigating officers are hard-pressed to find either a motive or an opportunity for the killing.

== Bibliography ==
- Evans, Curtis. Masters of the "Humdrum" Mystery: Cecil John Charles Street, Freeman Wills Crofts, Alfred Walter Stewart and the British Detective Novel, 1920–1961. McFarland, 2014.
- Magill, Frank Northen . Critical Survey of Mystery and Detective Fiction: Authors, Volume 3. Salem Press, 1988.
- Reilly, John M. Twentieth Century Crime & Mystery Writers. Springer, 2015.
