= This Undesirable Residence =

1942 novel

- First edition (UK)
- Author: Cecil Street
- Language: English
- Series: Desmond Merrion
- Genre: Detective
- Publisher: Collins Crime Club (UK); Dodd Mead (US)
- Publication date: 1942
- Publication place: United Kingdom
- Media type: Print
- Preceded by: Death of Two Brothers
- Followed by: Dead Stop

This Undesirable Residence is a 1942 detective novel by the British writer Cecil Street, writing under the pen name of Miles Burton. It was part of a lengthy series of books featuring the detective Desmond Merrion and Inspector Arnold of Scotland Yard. It was published in the United States by Dodd Mead under the alternative title Death at Ash House.

Like much of the series it takes place in rural England. In hisTimes Literary Supplement review Maurice Willson Disher drew attention to this "Lanes and fields, house, shed and pond, raspberry canes and gypsy encampment, form a drowsy background of English country life which admirably sets off the ruthless activities of some person unknown with a Nazi — as Mr. Churchill pronounces it — mind." A less positive review came from Isaac Anderson in the New York Times who wrote "Miles Burton has written some excellent detective tales, but this one does little to enhance his reputation.".

== Synopsis ==
Ash House is situated just off the main road between the town of Wraynesford and the village of Betherston. Despite being very attractive and well-situated it has failed to find a tenant for over a year. When at last a car turns up at the house, the gardener discover a corpse inside.

== Bibliography ==
- Evans, Curtis. Masters of the "Humdrum" Mystery: Cecil John Charles Street, Freeman Wills Crofts, Alfred Walter Stewart and the British Detective Novel, 1920-1961. McFarland, 2014.
- Herbert, Rosemary. Whodunit?: A Who's Who in Crime & Mystery Writing. Oxford University Press, 2003.
- Reilly, John M. Twentieth Century Crime & Mystery Writers. Springer, 2015.
