= The Corpse in the Car =

1935 novel

- American first edition
- Author: John Rhode
- Language: English
- Series: Lancelot Priestley
- Genre: Detective
- Publisher: Collins (UK); Dodd Mead (US)
- Publication date: 1935
- Publication place: United Kingdom
- Media type: Print
- Preceded by: Shot at Dawn
- Followed by: Hendon's First Case

The Corpse in the Car is a 1935 detective novel by John Rhode, the pen name of the British writer Cecil Street. It is the twentieth in his long-running series of novels featuring Lancelot Priestley, a Golden Age armchair detective. A review by Ralph Partridge in the New Statesman commented "Mr. Rhode has written a humdrum, workaday book in The Corpse in the Car. He belongs to the English school of Freeman Wills Crofts, with which it is impossible to find technical fault." In The Spectator Rupert Hart-Davis considered that "The Corpse in the Car is greatly inferior to his last book, Shot at Dawn."

== Synopsis ==
The imperious Lady Misterton goes out for her usual drive in Windsor Great Park on a cold February afternoon. However realising she has forgotten her bag she sends her chauffeur back on foot for a considerable distance to retrieve it. When he returns to the car he finds his employer dead, perhaps due to natural causes or possibly due to murder.

== Bibliography ==
- Evans, Curtis. Masters of the "Humdrum" Mystery: Cecil John Charles Street, Freeman Wills Crofts, Alfred Walter Stewart and the British Detective Novel, 1920-1961. McFarland, 2014.
- Herbert, Rosemary. Whodunit?: A Who's Who in Crime & Mystery Writing. Oxford University Press, 2003.
- Reilly, John M. Twentieth Century Crime & Mystery Writers. Springer, 2015.
