= Situation Vacant =

1946 novel

- First edition (UK)
- Author: Cecil Street
- Language: English
- Series: Desmond Merrion
- Genre: Detective
- Publisher: Collins
- Publication date: 1946
- Publication place: United Kingdom
- Media type: Print
- Preceded by: The Cat Jumps
- Followed by: Heir to Lucifer

Situation Vacant is a 1946 detective novel by the British writer Cecil Street, writing under the pen name of Miles Burton. It was the thirty fourth entry in a lengthy series of books featuring the detective Desmond Merrion and Inspector Arnold of Scotland Yard. As with much of the series it takes place in rural England.

== Synopsis ==
Two secretaries working for Mrs. Whyttington, owner of a manor house in a small village, die of poisoning within a few months of each other.

== Bibliography ==
- Evans, Curtis. Masters of the "Humdrum" Mystery: Cecil John Charles Street, Freeman Wills Crofts, Alfred Walter Stewart and the British Detective Novel, 1920-1961. McFarland, 2014.
- Herbert, Rosemary. Whodunit?: A Who's Who in Crime & Mystery Writing. Oxford University Press, 2003.
- Reilly, John M. Twentieth Century Crime & Mystery Writers. Springer, 2015.
