= Death on Sunday =

1939 novel

- Author: John Rhode
- Language: English
- Series: Lancelot Priestley
- Genre: Detective
- Publisher: Collins Crime Club (UK); Dodd Mead (US)
- Publication date: 1939
- Publication place: United Kingdom
- Media type: Print
- Preceded by: Death Pays a Dividend
- Followed by: Death on the Boat Train

Death on Sunday is a 1939 detective novel by John Rhode, the pen name of the British writer Cecil Street. It is the thirty first in his series featuring Lancelot Priestley, one of the stalwarts of the Golden Age of Detective Fiction, although much of the investigation is performed by Inspector Jimmy Waghorn of Scotland Yard. It was published in London by the Collins Crime Club and was released in the United States by Dodd, Mead under the alternative title The Elm Tree Murder.

== Synopsis ==
Working undercover to uncover a major robbery and forgery gang, Waghorn goes to stay at the refined Barleyfield House a wealthy residential home located in the stockbroker belt outside London. However during his stay one of the others is killed by the falling branch of an elm tree. Subsequent investigation, prompted by the suggestions of Priestley, lead him to discover that the man was not who he pretended to be and was almost certainly at the centre of the racket. He sets out to disperse the surviving operation of the gang and unmask the murderer.

== Bibliography ==
- Evans, Curtis. Masters of the "Humdrum" Mystery: Cecil John Charles Street, Freeman Wills Crofts, Alfred Walter Stewart and the British Detective Novel, 1920–1961. McFarland, 2014.
- Magill, Frank Northen . Critical Survey of Mystery and Detective Fiction: Authors, Volume 3. Salem Press, 1988.
- Reilly, John M. Twentieth Century Crime & Mystery Writers. Springer, 2015.
