= The Paddington Mystery =

1925 novel

- First edition
- Author: John Rhode
- Language: English
- Series: Lancelot Priestley
- Genre: Detective
- Publisher: Geoffrey Bles
- Publication date: 1925
- Publication place: United Kingdom
- Media type: Print
- Followed by: Dr. Priestley's Quest

The Paddington Mystery is a 1925 detective novel by John Rhode, a pen name of the British writer Cecil Street. It marked the first appearance of Lancelot Priestley, who featured in a long-running series of novels during the Golden Age of Detective Fiction. A scientific genius, Priestley is an armchair detective who can solve a mystery without actually visiting the scene of the crime.

== Synopsis ==
After returning one night from a nightclub, Harold Merefield finds a man's dead body lying in his bed. He turns to Doctor Priestley, the father of his former fiancée April.

== Bibliography ==
- Evans, Curtis. Masters of the "Humdrum" Mystery: Cecil John Charles Street, Freeman Wills Crofts, Alfred Walter Stewart and the British Detective Novel, 1920-1961. McFarland, 2014.
- Herbert, Rosemary. Whodunit?: A Who's Who in Crime & Mystery Writing. Oxford University Press, 2003.
- James, Russell. Great British Fictional Detectives. Remember When, 21 Apr 2009.
