= Hendon's First Case =

1935 novel

- First edition
- Author: John Rhode
- Language: English
- Series: Lancelot Priestley
- Genre: Detective
- Publisher: Collins Crime Club (UK); Dodd Mead (US)
- Publication date: 1935
- Publication place: United Kingdom
- Media type: Print
- Preceded by: The Corpse in the Car
- Followed by: Mystery at Olympia

Hendon's First Case is a 1935 detective novel by John Rhode, the pen name of the British writer Cecil Street. It is the twenty first in his long-running series of novels featuring Lancelot Priestley, a Golden Age armchair detective. The novel introduced the character Inspector Jimmy Waghorn, a graduate of the newly established Hendon Police College. Over time Waghorn would increasingly become a central figure in the series.

In his review in the New Statesman Ralph Partridge noted the similarities between Superintendent Hanslet and Inspector French in Crime at Guildford by Freeman Wills Crofts, and concluded "Mr. Rhode has added another satisfactory but undistinguished volume to his shelf.". The Times Literary Supplement described it as a "pleasantly written, well-constructed book".

== Synopsis ==
A famous research chemist Bernard Threlfall is found dead and his laboratory ransacked. He had also been about to change his will, potentially giving his relatives motives for his death. The case is extremely tricky providing a test for both the different detecting styles of the new Inspector Waghorn and the more traditional Superintendent Hanslet. Ultimately both are forced to turn to the genius of Professor Priestley to solve the puzzle.

== Bibliography ==
- Evans, Curtis. Masters of the "Humdrum" Mystery: Cecil John Charles Street, Freeman Wills Crofts, Alfred Walter Stewart and the British Detective Novel, 1920-1961. McFarland, 2014.
- Herbert, Rosemary. Whodunit?: A Who's Who in Crime & Mystery Writing. Oxford University Press, 2003.
- Reilly, John M. Twentieth Century Crime & Mystery Writers. Springer, 2015.
