= Murder of a Chemist =

1936 novel

- First edition (UK)
- Author: Cecil Street
- Language: English
- Series: Desmond Merrion
- Genre: Detective
- Publisher: Collins Crime Club (UK); Doubleday (US)
- Publication date: 1936
- Publication place: United Kingdom
- Media type: Print
- Preceded by: Death in the Tunnel
- Followed by: Where Is Barbara Prentice?

Murder of a Chemist is a 1936 detective novel by the British writer Cecil Street, writing under the pen name of Miles Burton. It is the fourteenth in a series of books featuring the Golden Age amateur detective Desmond Merrion and Inspector Arnold of Scotland Yard.

== Synopsis ==
Josiah Elvidge a disagreeable chemist and a member of the Downchester Bowling Association is part of a touring party which stops for lunch at the Crown Hotel. After drinking a glass of lemonade Elvidge falls dead and Inspector Arnold who happens to be dining at the same hotel, is called over. It is soon established that Elvidge has been murdered by oxalic poisoning.

== Bibliography ==
- Evans, Curtis. Masters of the "Humdrum" Mystery: Cecil John Charles Street, Freeman Wills Crofts, Alfred Walter Stewart and the British Detective Novel, 1920-1961. McFarland, 2014.
- Herbert, Rosemary. Whodunit?: A Who's Who in Crime & Mystery Writing. Oxford University Press, 2003.
- Reilly, John M. Twentieth Century Crime & Mystery Writers. Springer, 2015.
