= Tragedy on the Line =

1931 novel

- First Edition (UK)
- Author: John Rhode
- Language: English
- Series: Lancelot Priestley
- Genre: Detective
- Publisher: Collins Crime Club (UK); Dodd Mead (US)
- Publication date: 1931
- Publication place: United Kingdom
- Media type: Print
- Preceded by: Pinehurst
- Followed by: The Hanging Woman

Tragedy on the Line is a 1931 detective novel by John Rhode, the pen name of the British writer Cecil Street. It is the tenth in his long-running series of novels featuring Lancelot Priestley, a Golden Age armchair detective who works alongside the less sharp-witted Superintendent Hanslet of Scotland Yard. It was published in the United States the same year by Dodd Mead.

== Synopsis ==
The wealthy Gervase Wickenden is found dead on the railway line near Upton Bishop's station. Decapitated it is at first assumed he was killed by a train, until a bullet is discovered in a nearby tree. Added to this was the suspicious fact that he had changed his will only two days before, and both the old and the new version are now missing.

== Bibliography ==
- Evans, Curtis. Masters of the "Humdrum" Mystery: Cecil John Charles Street, Freeman Wills Crofts, Alfred Walter Stewart and the British Detective Novel, 1920-1961. McFarland, 2014.
- Herbert, Rosemary. Whodunit?: A Who's Who in Crime & Mystery Writing. Oxford University Press, 2003.
- Reilly, John M. Twentieth Century Crime & Mystery Writers. Springer, 2015.
