= Trench and Camp =

National / Maryland military newspaper

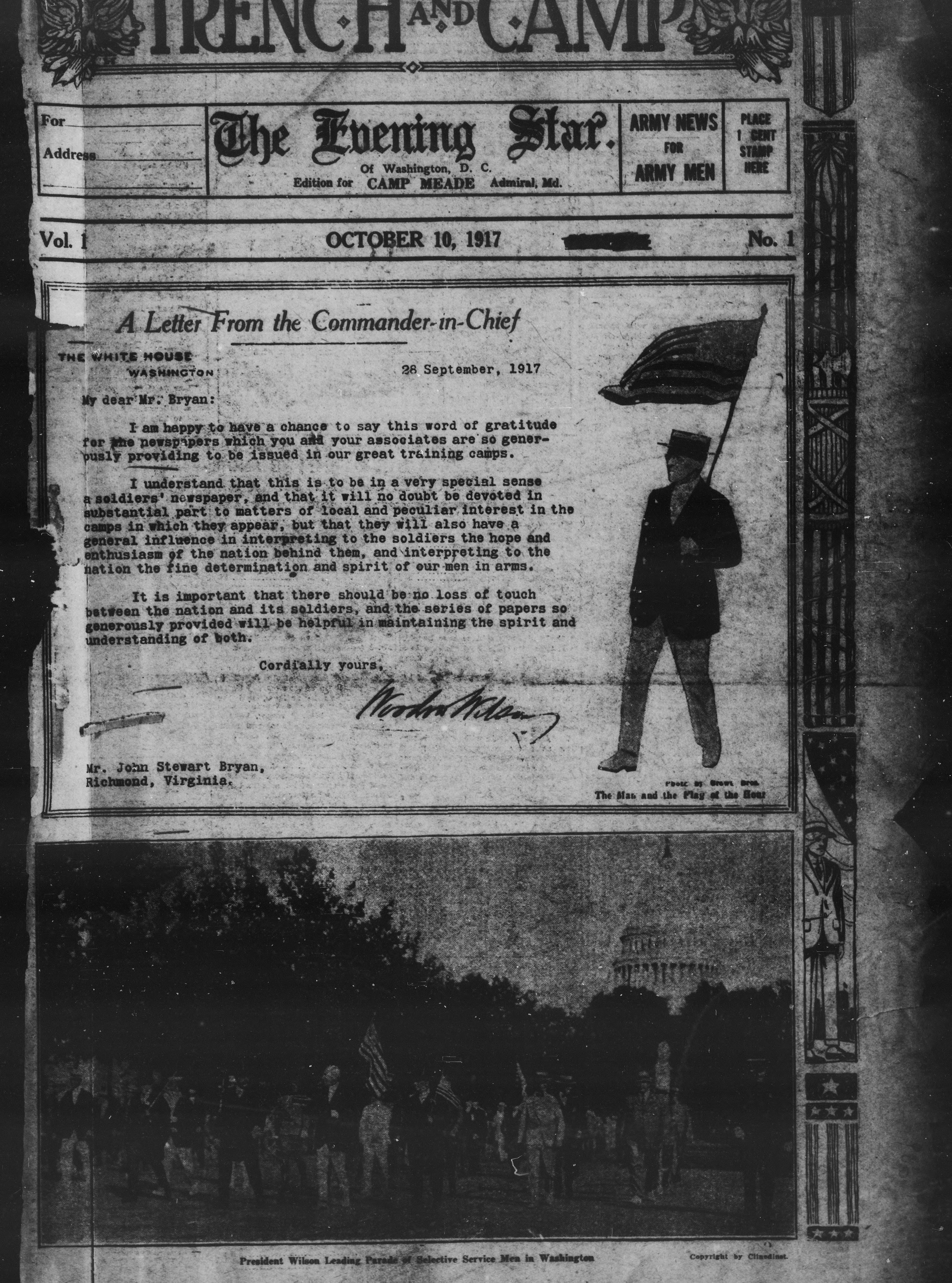
- Camp Meade edition inaugural issue cover page
- Type: Chain of weekly newspapers
- Founded: October 1917
- Ceased publication: 1919
- City: Multiple
- Country: United States of America

The Trench and Camp was a chain of World War I-era newspapers printed for the United States military personnel. Newspapers belonging to the chain were produced in up to 38 different military training camps in the continental United States starting from October 1917. The newspapers were produced in cooperation with the National War Work Council of the Young Men’s Christian Association of the United States. Half of the weekly newspapers' contents was provided by the YMCA, while the other half was produced locally by each newspaper. The contents spanned both national and local matters.

== Editions ==
The Trench and Camp served as part of the War Department’s contract with the NWWC towards a goal of maintaining morale and morality in U.S. troops. Different editions of the paper were coordinated by John Stewart Bryan, publisher of the Richmond News Leader, for different locales across the country.

For example, the Admiral, Maryland edition was published to serve the personnel of Camp Meade in Maryland. It chronicled events at Camp Meade while also printing common content provided by the NWWC. Its coverage focused on camp events, regimental comings and goings, and patriotic and inspirational content. This edition was printed at the plant of the Evening Star in Washington, D.C. Over the course of its run, editors of the paper included Edwin R. Gontrum and N. Howard Hughes, two former employees of Baltimore’s the Sun. In 1919, a parody paper called the “Wrench and Camp” was printed, satirizing the publication.

== Controversy ==
In the course of its run, the NWWC, and by extension the Trench and Camp, garnered some controversy. While the NWWC claimed to cooperate with Jewish and Catholic groups with similar missions, they still operated with strong protestant tones, which extended to the paper. This led to criticism of proselytizing and promotion of protestant ideals. The NWWC also garnered allegations of misappropriation of government funds.
