= Cecil Street =

British writer (1884–1964)

Major Cecil Street OBE MC
- Born: Cecil John Charles Street; 3 May 1884; Gibraltar
- Died: 8 December 1964 (aged 80); Eastbourne, East Sussex
- Spouse(s): Hyacinth Maud Kirwan; Eileen Annette Waller
- Military career
- Allegiance: United Kingdom
- Branch: British Army
- Rank: Major
- Commands: Royal Garrison Artillery
- Conflicts: World War I Irish War of Independence
- Awards: MC; OBE
- Other work: Crime fiction writer

Cecil John Charles Street OBE MC (3 May 1884 – 8 December 1964), also known as John Street, was a major in the British Army and a crime fiction novelist.

He began his military career as an artillery officer and during World War I, he became a propagandist for MI7. During the Irish War of Independence, he acted as an Information Officer for Dublin Castle alternating between Dublin and London and working closely with the British official Lionel Curtis. He later earned his living as a prolific writer of detective novels written under several pseudonyms including John Rhode, Miles Burton and Cecil Waye.

== Early life, education, and career ==
Street was born in Gibraltar to General John Alfred Street CB of Woking, and his second wife, Caroline, daughter of Charles Horsfall Bill of Storthes Hall, Yorkshire, head of a landed gentry family. Caroline had married comparatively late and her only son was born when she was thirty-five. General Street, having retired from the Army at the age of sixty-two just after his son's birth, died suddenly. Consequently, Street and his mother went to live with his maternal grandparents at their house in Firlands, Woking, which was "comfortably staffed with seven domestics". Street remained "modestly circumspect" about his privileged background in later life and valued "a man's personal accomplishments over his family heritage".

Street was educated in Wellington College, Berkshire and later in Royal Military Academy, Woolwich, and was commissioned into the Royal Artillery in 1903, before getting transferred to the Special Reserves. Before the First World War, he lived at Summerhill, a regency country mansion outside Lyme Regis (later owned by the Scottish educator A. S. Neill and run as a school, the name being subsequently used for his school at Leiston, Suffolk), where he was a shareholder in, and chief engineer for, the Lyme Regis Electric Light & Power Company.

He later served as a Captain in the Royal Garrison Artillery. He was wounded three times in combat and won the Military Cross for his services. As a Major, he headed a branch of British Military Intelligence and later, he acted as an Information Officer at the headquarters of the British administration, based in Dublin Castle.

== Marriages ==
In 1906, Street married Hyacinth Maud Kirwan, daughter of Major John Denis Kirwan of the Royal Artillery. They had a daughter, Verena Hyacinth Iris Street, who spent most of her life living with her grandmother and died in 1932 aged 25. The marriage was unsuccessful, with Maud suffering mental imbalance and getting admitted to a private asylum. They were separated by the late 1930s.

Street later lived with Eileen Annette Waller, granddaughter of the Irish writer John Francis Waller, who belonged to a landed gentry branch of the Waller baronets of Tipperary. They married in 1949, shortly after his first wife's death. They lived "a comfortable life together" living in "attractive older homes" including The Orchards, Laddingford, Kent, and Swanton Novers, Norfolk.

== Novelist ==
John Street wrote three series of novels; one under the name of John Rhode, mostly featuring the mathematics professor Dr. Lancelot Priestley; another under the name of Miles Burton, mostly featuring the retired naval officer Desmond Merrion; and a third under the name of Cecil Waye, featuring the Perrins Investigators.

The Dr. Priestley novels followed in the tradition of Arthur Conan Doyle's Sherlock Holmes mysteries and R. Austin Freeman's Dr. Thorndyke books by featuring scientific detection of crimes, such as analysing the mud on suspects' shoes.

Notable crime fiction critic Julian Symons considered Street to be a prominent member of the "Humdrum" school of detective fiction. According to Symons, "Most of them [the "Humdrums"] came late to writing fiction, and few had much talent for it. They had some skill in constructing puzzles, nothing more, and ironically they fulfilled much better than S. S. Van Dine his dictum that the detective story properly belonged in the category of riddles or crossword puzzles. Most of the Humdrums were British, and among the best known of them were Major John Street." The historian Jacques Barzun was more positive towards Street, praising several Rhode books in particular, even though he reviewed only a small proportion of the more than 140 novels written by Street.

In recent years, copies of many Rhode and Burton books have become hard to obtain and are highly sought after by collectors, often commanding "eye-wateringly" high prices.

The only detailed account of Street's life and works was written by the crime fiction historian Curtis Evans in his 2012 book Masters of the "Humdrum" Mystery who wrote the book "in part to give a long overdue reappraisal of these purportedly "humdrum" detection writers as accomplished literary artists. Not only did they produce a goodly number of fine fair play puzzles, but their clever tales have more intrinsic interest as social documents and even sometimes as literary novels than they have been credited with having."

== Bibliography ==
=== Writing as John Rhode ===
==== Dr. Priestley novels ====
Featuring Lancelot Priestley, Inspector Hanslet and Inspector Waghorn

- The Paddington Mystery (1925)
- Dr. Priestley's Quest (1926)
- The Ellerby Case (1927)
- The Murders in Praed Street (1928)
- Tragedy at the Unicorn (1928)
- The House on Tollard Ridge (1929). (On first publication in the U.S. the book was promoted as being by C J C Street)
- The Davidson Case (1929) (U.S. title Murder at Bratton Grange; on first publication in the U.S. the book was promoted as being by C J C Street)
- Peril at Cranbury Hall (1930)
- Pinehurst (1930) (U.S. title Dr. Priestley Investigates; on first publication in the U.S. the book was promoted as being by C J C Street)
- Tragedy on the Line (1931). (On first publication in the U.S. the book was promoted as being by C J C Street)
- The Hanging Woman (1931)
- Mystery at Greycombe Farm (1932) (U.S. title The Fire at Greycombe Farm; on first publication in the U.S. the book was promoted as being by C J C Street)
- Dead Men at the Folly (1932)
- The Motor Rally Mystery (1933) (U.S. title Dr. Priestley Lays a Trap; on its publication in the U.S. the book was promoted as being by C J C Street)
- The Claverton Mystery (1933) (U.S. title The Claverton Affair)
- The Venner Crime (1933)
- The Robthorne Mystery (1934) When one of the Robthorne twins commits suicide, there is a question over which one it is and whether it was suicide or murder.
- Poison for One (1934)
- Shot at Dawn (1934)
- The Corpse in the Car (1935) Dr. Priestley solves how Lady Misterton was killed whilst sitting, alone, in her car. Supt Hanslet attempts to track down her killer.
- Hendon's First Case (1935). (In first publication in the U.S. the book was promoted as being by C J C Street)
- Mystery at Olympia (1935) (U.S. title Murder at the Motor Show)
- Death at Breakfast (1936)
- In Face of the Verdict (1936) (U.S. title In the Face of the Verdict)
- Death in the Hopfields (1937) (U.S. title The Harvest Murder)
- Death on the Board (1937) (U.S. title Death Sits on the Board)
- Proceed with Caution (1937) (U.S. title Body Unidentified)
- Invisible Weapons (1938)
- The Bloody Tower (1938) (U.S. title The Tower of Evil) – Inspector Waghorn identifies a ruthless murderer and solves a set of clues to the whereabouts of long-hidden treasure
- Death Pays a Dividend (1939)
- Death on Sunday (1939) (U.S. title The Elm Tree Murder)
- Death on the Boat Train (1940)
- Murder at Lilac Cottage (1940)
- Death at the Helm (1941)
- They Watched by Night (1941) (U.S. title Signal For Death)
- The Fourth Bomb (1942)
- Dead on the Track (1943)
- Men Die at Cyprus Lodge (1943)
- Death Invades the Meeting (1944)
- Vegetable Duck (1944) (U.S. title Too Many Suspects)
- Bricklayer's Arms (1945) (U.S. title Shadow of a Crime) (Dr. Priestley plays only a minor role in this book, all the actual detection being done by Inspector Waghorn)
- The Lake House (1946) (U.S. title Secret of the Lake House)
- Death in Harley Street (1946)
- Nothing But the Truth (1947) (U.S. title Experiment in Crime)
- Death of an Author (1947)
- The Paper Bag (1948) (U.S. title The Links in the Chain)
- The Telephone Call (1948) (U.S. title Shadow of an Alibi)
- Blackthorn House (1949)
- Up the Garden Path (1949) (U.S. title The Fatal Garden)
- The Two Graphs (1950) (U.S. title Double Identities)
- Family Affairs (1950) (U.S. title The Last Suspect)
- The Secret Meeting (1951)
- Doctor Goodwood's Locum (1951) (U.S. title The Affair of the Substitute Doctor)
- Death at the Dance (1952)
- Death in Wellington Road (1952)
- Death at the Inn (1953) (U.S. title The Case of the Forty Thieves) – Inspector Waghorn breaks a gang of thieves who have found an ingenious way to defraud the Post Office and, along the way, murder a man by poisoning
- By Registered Post (1953) (U.S. title The Mysterious Suspect)
- Death on the Lawn (1954)
- The Dovebury Murders (1954)
- Death of a Godmother (1955) (U.S. title Delayed Payment)
- The Domestic Agency (1955) (U.S. title Grave Matters; on first publication in the U.S. the novel was promoted as being by C J C Street)
- An Artist Dies (1956) (U.S. title Death of an Artist)
- Open Verdict (1956)
- Death of a Bridegroom (1957)
- Robbery With Violence (1957)
- Death Takes a Partner (1958)
- Licensed For Murder (1958)
- Murder at Derivale (1958). (On first publication in the U.S. the book was promoted as being by C J C Street)
- Three Cousins Die (1959)
- The Fatal Pool (1960)
- Twice Dead (1960)
- The Vanishing Diary (1961)

==== Non-series novels ====
- A.S.F.: The Story of a Great Conspiracy (1924) (U.S. title The White Menace). Non-series thriller.
- The Double Florin (1924)
- The Alarm (1925)
- Mademoiselle From Armentieres (1927)
- Drop to His Death (1939) (U.S. title Fatal Descent; on its first publication in the U.S. the book was promoted as being solely by C J C Street), with "Carter Dickson", a pseudonym of John Dickson Carr
- Night Exercise (1942) (U.S. title Dead of the Night). Sir Hector Chalgrove, acerbic businessman and Home Guard Colonel, disappears during a World War II night exercise. Major Ledbury (Officer Commanding the Wealdhurst Company, Home Guard) assists police to find the killer and assuage local suspicion of his guilt.

==== Non-fiction books ====
- The Case of Constance Kent

==== Short stories ====
- The Elusive Bullet. Stories of Detection, Mystery and Horror - Second Series, Ed. Dorothy L Sayers, 1931 (Dr. Priestley story). Reprinted: Bodies from the Library. Ed. Tony Medawar. HarperCollins, 2018
- The Vanishing Diamond. The Great Book of Thrillers. Ed. H. Douglas Thomson, 1935 (Dr. Priestley story)
- The Yellow Sphere. Sunday Dispatch, 3 April 1938. Reprinted: Bodies from the Library 3. Ed. Tony Medawar. HarperCollins, 2020.
- The Purple Line. Evening Standard, 20 January 1950. Reprinted: Evening Standard Detective Book, 1950 (Inspector Purley story)

==== Non-fiction articles ====
- Constance Kent. The Anatomy of Murder, Bodley Head, 1936
- Why People Like Detective Stories. The Listener, 2 October 1935
- Unsolved Mysteries No. 6: Solution to the "Mystery of the Murdered Lieutenant". The Star, 1938

==== Stage plays ====
- Sixpennyworth. Bodies from the Library 2. Ed. Tony Medawar. HarperCollins, 2019. The play features Inspector Jimmy Waghorn and is set in the lounge of The Spotted Dog, a pub in a town whose name is not given, "emphatically so"; the play features a neat method of creating an instant blackout. No performances have been identified

==== Radio plays ====
- Dr. Priestley, BBC Empire Service, talk as part of the series 'Meet the Detective', 1935
- The Strange Affair at the Old Dutch Mill, play featuring Inspector Jimmy Waghorn, BBC National Programme, 7 October 1938, as part of the series 'What Happened at 8:20?"
- Death Travels First, two-part play featuring Inspector Jimmy Waghorn, BBC Home Service, 2 and 9 July 1940 as part of a series of plays by members of the Detection Club

==== Non-fiction radio programmes ====
- Thoughts of a Detective Story Writer, BBC National Programme, 7, 14, 21 and 28 September 1935

=== Writing as Miles Burton ===
==== Desmond Merrion novels ====
Featuring Desmond Merrion and Inspector Henry Arnold

- The Secret of High Eldersham (1930) (aka The Mystery of High Eldersham)
- The Menace on the Downs (1931)
- The Three Crimes (1931)
- Death of Mr. Gantley (1932)
- Fate at the Fair (1933)
- Tragedy at the Thirteenth Hole (1933)
- Death at the Crossroads (1933)
- To Catch A Thief (1934)
- The Charabanc Mystery (1934)
- The Devereux Court Mystery (1935)
- The Milk Churn Murder (1935) (U.S. title The Clue of the Silver Brush)
- Where is Barbara Prentice? (1936) (U.S. title The Clue of the Silver Cellar)
- Death in the Tunnel (1936) (U.S. title Dark Is the Tunnel)
- Murder of a Chemist (1936)
- Death at the Club (1937) (U.S. title The Clue of the Fourteen Keys)
- Murder in Crown Passage (1937) (U.S. title The Man with the Tattooed Face)
- Death at Low Tide (1938)
- The Platinum Cat (1938)
- Mr. Babbacombe Dies (1939)
- Death Leaves No Card (1939)
- Death Takes a Flat (1940) (U.S. title Vacancy With Corpse)
- Murder in the Coalhole (1940) (U.S. title Written in Dust)
- Mr. Westerby Missing (1940)
- Up The Garden Path (1941) (U.S. title Death Visits Downspring)
- Death of Two Brothers (1941)
- This Undesirable Residence (1942) (U.S. title Death at Ash House)
- Dead Stop (1943)
- Murder M.D. (1943) (U.S. title Who Killed the Doctor?)
- Four-Ply Yarn (1944) (U.S. title The Shadow on the Cliff)
- The Three Corpse Trick (1944)
- Early Morning Murder (1945) (U.S. title Accidents Do Happen)
- Not A Leg to Stand On (1945)
- The Cat Jumps (1946)
- Situation Vacant (1946) -Two secretaries for Alys Whyttington die within months of each other. Arnold, Merrion and local confidant Mr Clipsham investigate the deaths and the mysterious past of Mrs Whyttington.
- Heir to Lucifer (1947)
- A Will in the Way (1947)
- Devil's Reckoning (1948)
- Death in Shallow Water (1948)
- Death Takes the Living (1949) (U.S. title The Disappearing Parson)
- Look Alive (1949)
- Ground for Suspicion (1950)
- A Village Afraid (1950)
- Beware Your Neighbour (1951)
- Murder Out of School (1951)
- Murder on Duty (1952)
- Heir to Murder (1953)
- Something to Hide (1953)
- Murder in Absence (1954)
- Unwanted Corpse (1954)
- A Crime in Time (1955)
- Murder Unrecognized (1955)
- Death in a Duffle Coat (1956)
- Found Drowned (1956)
- The Chinese Puzzle (1957)
- The Moth-Watch Murder (1957)
- Bones in the Brickfield (1958)
- Death Takes a Detour (1958)
- Return from the Dead (1959)
- A Smell of Smoke (1960)
- Legacy of Death (1960)
- Death Paints a Picture (1960)

==== Non-series novels ====
- The Hardway Diamonds Mystery (1930)
- Murder at the Moorings (1932)

==== Unfinished material ====
- Untitled, 48-page typescript of the opening chapters of a Merrion/Arnold novel, set in the villages of Kildersham and Dreford and concerning a death at a pheasant shoot and a drowning.

=== Writing as Cecil Waye ===
==== "The Perrins" novels ====
Featuring Christopher and Vivienne Perrin

- Murder at Monk's Barn (1931)
- The Figure of Eight (1931)
- The End of the Chase (1932)
- The Prime Minister's Pencil (1933)

=== Writing as F.O.O. (Forward Observation Officer) ===
==== Novels ====
- The Worldly Hope (Eveleigh Nash Company), 1917, a war novel.

==== Non-fiction books ====
- With the Guns (Eveleigh Nash Company), 1916
- The Making of a Gunner, 1916

=== Writing as I.O. (Intelligence Officer) ===
==== Non-fiction books ====
- The Administration of Ireland, 1920, 1921 at Internet Archive

=== Writing as C. J. C. Street ===
==== Non-fiction books and pamphlets ====
- Ireland in 1921, 1922 Full text at Internet Archive
- Hungary and Democracy, 1923
- Rhineland and Ruhr, Alfred Couldray, 1923
- East of Prague, 1924 Limited view at Google Books
- The Treachery of France, 1924 Limited view at Google Books
- Lord Reading, 1928 Limited view at Google Books
- President Masaryk Bles, 1930

==== Translations ====
- French Headquarters: 1915-1918 by Jean de Pierrefeu, 1925, translated with notes.
- Vauban, Builder of Fortresses by Daniel Halvey, 1929, translated with notes.
- The Life and Voyages of Captain Cook by Maurice Thiery, 1929, translated with notes.

==== Short fiction ====
- The Artillery Signaller. Sydney Morning Herald, 29 December 1917
- The Artillery Duel. West Australian, 1 January 1918
- A New Army Battery. Brisbane Courier, 1 January 1918
- A Quiet Night Watch. Launceston Examiner, 4 January 1918
- The Duel. Hobart Mercury, 8 January 1918
- On the Flank of the Battle. Melbourne Leader, 12 January 1918
- Paying a Morning Call. The New Zealand Times, 14 January 1918
- An Airman's Evening. Oamaru Mail, 18 January 1918
- Ending a Nuisance. Taranaki Herald, 21 January 1918
- A Night Alarm. Newcastle Morning Herald & Miners' Advocate, 30 January 1918
- A Combined Shoot. National Advocate, 31 January 1917
- The Sacrifice. Townsville Daily Bulletin, 18 February 1918
- Running the Gauntlet. Hobart Daily Post, 22 February 1918
- The Counter Attack. Taranaki Herald, 26 February 1918
- Gunner Morson, Signaller. Trench and Camp (Camp Logan Edition), 11 March 1918
- Ending a Nuisance. Brisbane Evening Telegraph, 11 March 1918
- Ready for Action, Sir. Launceston Examiner, 12 April 1918
- An Overhaul. The World's News, 13 April 1918
- A Quiet Night. Mary Borough Chronicle, 26 April 1918
- Getting the Wind Up. War Supplement for Week Ending 27 April 1918
- Stuck in the Mud. Chicago Tribune, 2 June 1918
- The Musketeers: The Tale of Their Adventures in France. Newcastle Morning Herald & Miners’ Advocate, 4 June 1918
- Slaves of the Guns. World’s News, 29 June 1918
- An Unexpected Shoot. The Age, 20 July 1918
- Under Fire. Feilding Star, 29 July 1918. Reprinted; Taranaki Herald, 1 August 1918
- The Thick of It. Leeds Mercury, 14 August 191* ‘’The Time of Watching’’. Perth Daily Need, 20 August 1918
- Not a Blank. Leeds Mercury, 21 August 1918
- The Watcher. (Washington) Sunday Star, 25 August 1918
- Guy Fawkes’ Day. Adelaide Journal, 21 September 1918
- Behind the Front. Hobart Mercury, 28 October 1918
- Destroying the Tower. Grafton Argus & Clarence River General Advertiser, 4 November 1918

==== Short stories ====
- On the High Seas. Cassell's Magazine, September 1920
- Salvage. Lloyd's Story Magazine, September 1922
- The Ship's Doctor. Sea Stories, 5 October 1923

==== Non-fiction articles ====
- TITLE UNKNOWN. Every Week Illustrated. 18 April 1914 - Not confirmed
- The Time of Waiting: Synchronising Watches. Perth Daily News, 7 June 1917
- Gives Mask to Girl and Dies. Indianapolis Star, 9 December 1917
- The Artillery Signaller. Brisbane Telegraph, 29 December 1917
- A New Army Battery: The Making of a Gunner. Brisbane Courier, 1 January 1918
- The Artillery Duel. The West Australian, 1 January 1918
- On the Flank of the Battle. Melbourne Leader, 12 January 1918
- On the High Seas. Taranaki Herald, 18 January 1918
- A Combined Shoot. National Advocate, 31 January 1918
- The Equipment of a Battery. Oamaru Times, 2 February 1918
- The Heavy Artillery Chaplain. Taranaki Herald, 22 February 1918
- Artillery Registration. Newcastle Journal, 25 February 1918
- Gunners and Their Targets. Leeds Mercury, 2 March 1918
- Barrage. Straits Times, 6 March 1918.
- Supplying in the Field. Straits Times, 12 March 1918
- Cambrai. The New Zealand Times, 12 March 1918
- In a German Gun-Pit. Taranaki Herald, 20 March 1918
- The Hedjaz Railway. Newcastle Morning Herald & Miners' Advocate, 2 April 1918
- Mechanical Transport. New Zealand Herald, 6 April 1918
- Armentieres. Wilmington Morning News, 6 April 1918
- The Paris Long Range Gun. Leeds Mercury, 8 April 1918
- Artillery in War. The Age, 13 January 1918
- Reaping the Whirlwind. Straits Times, 15 April 1918
- Watching a Shoot. Every Week Illustrated, 18 April 1918
- Rifle First and Last. Coventry Evening Telegraph, 20 April 1918
- Arabian Campaign Operations of the Arabs. Launceston Daily Telegraph, 20 April 1918
- When Gas Ceases to be Deadly. Lincolnshire Echo, 22 April 1918
- How Guns Move Forward. Darling Downs Gazette, 22 April 1918
- Muscle and Brain. Daily Record, Monday 22 April 1918
- Constructional Material in the Field. Oamaru Mail, 22 April 1918
- The Hedjaz Railway. Taranaki Herald, 25 April 1918
- Artillery Ammunition. Nelson Evening Mail, 26 April 1918
- Importance of Amiens. Northern Whig, 27 April 1918
- Before the Dawn. Taranaki Herald, 27 April 1918
- The Fall of Jericho. Taranaki Herald, 27 April 1918
- The 'Number One'. Mainland Daily Mercury, 27 April 1918
- Physical Training. Leeds Mercury, 29 April 1918
- Austria's Next War. Maryborough Chronicle, 3 May 1918
- The 'Number One': The Day's Work of an Artillery Sergeant. Brisbane Courier, 7 May 1918
- A Junker's Boastings. Tamworth Daily Observer, 8 May 1918
- Artillery in Modern War. Perth Daily News, 13 May 1918
- The Right-of-Way. Dominion, 14 May 1918
- A Forgotten Project. Dominion, 14 May 1918
- Spying out the Land. Perth Western Mail, 17 May 1918
- The Tail of the Convoy. Taranaki Herald, 29 May 1918
- The Preliminary Bombardment. The Age, 1 June 1918
- Artillery Training. Taranaki Herald, 4 June 1918
- The Musketeers: The Tale of Their Adventures in France. Newcastle Morning Herald & Miners' Advocate, 4 June 1918
- The Line of Fire. Evening Star, 7 June 1918
- Artillery Ammunition, The Food of the Guns: How It Is Made. Bowen Independent, 8 June 1918
- Mechanical Transport in War. Singapore Free Press & Mercantile Advertiser, 8 June 1918
- Directing the Guns: How a Barrage is Controlled. Launceston Examiner, 10 June 1918
- Towards the Front: How the Battery Goes up. Maryborough Chronicle, 13 June 1918
- Artillery Registration. Straits Times, 15 June 1918
- The Line of Fire: Modern Gunnery Methods. Launceston Daily Telegraph, 15 June 1918
- Modern Gunnery. Malaya Tribune, 18 June 1918
- British Forces in Italy, Their Important Task: Italian Chivalry. Ballarat Star, 27 June 1918
- Slave of the Guns. Sydney World's News, 29 June 1918
- Long Range Artillery. Cornhill Magazine, July 1918
- Artillery Training: The New Battery's First Days in Framce. Ballarat Star, 13 July 1918
- Bombarded French City: Reims before the War, Its Former Attractions. Ballarat Star, 15 July 1918
- The Day of Assault: What the Barrage Means. Launceston Daily Telegraph, 18 July 1918
- War Shows Need of Long Forgotten Euphrates Road. Lincoln Star, 21 July 1918
- In the Background: The Training of Personnel. The Herald (Adelaide), 7 August 1918
- The Day of Assault. Evening Post, 28 August 1918
- Side-Lines in Munition. Dominion, 15 August 1918
- The Time of Waiting. Dominion, 27 August 1918
- On the Highway. Pictorial Supplement for Week Ending 31 August 1918
- The Bombing School: Modern Methods of Training. Adelaide Journal, 31 August 1918
- Big Guns in Hiding. Auckland Star, 31 August 1918
- My Billet. Pictorial Supplement for Week Ending 6 September 1918
- War Clearly Proved Artillery Value. (Wilmington) Daily Journal, 21 September 1918. Street's original title was 'Counter Battery Work'
- 'The Mad English': Guy Fawke's Day. Adelaide Journal, 21 September 1918
- The Liberty Columns. Dominion, 24 September 1918
- Railways and Their Importance in War. Windsor Magazine, September 1918
- Directing the Guns. Windsor Magazine, October 1918
- Behind the Front: A Morning Drive in France. Hobart Mercury, 28 October 1918
- My Billet. Hobart Mercury, 29 October 1918
- A Prisoner of War Camp: The Link with Napoleonic War. Hobart Mercury, 29 October 1918
- Munitions of War. Auckland Star, 2 November 1918
- Destroying the Tower, a Risky Job: American Artillery Scores. Grafton Argus & Clavener River General Advertiser, 4 November 1918
- Education at the Front. The Age, 7 November 1918
- At the Crossroads. The Age, 9 November 1918
- Artillery Training: The Telephonists. Hobart Mercury, 9 November 1918
- Active Service Army Schools. Sydney World's News, 9 November 1918
- Kite Balloon Section's Experience in Big Run. Richmond Times-Dispatch, 15 November 1918
- The Value of the French Railway System in the War. Toodyay Herald, 23 November 1918
- In the Background: The Repairs of Material. Hobart Mercury, 28 November 1918
- Behind the Front. Boston Globe, 5 January 1919
- Propaganda behind the Lines, Cornhill Magazine, November 1919
- Transport Problems and Reconstruction. Windsor Magazine, December 1919
- Fuel and Power. Windsor Magazine, March 1920
- The Fuel Problem and the Near Future. Tambellup Times, 14 April 1920
- The Wireless Telephone and the Development of Modern Communications. Windsor Magazine, June 1920
- Irish Secret Societies. The Bookman, November 1922
- Slovak Peasant Art, Illustrated Review, August 1923
- Railways of Czechoslovakia. Railway Gazette, 14 December 1923
- Slovakia Past and Present. Illustrated Review [Not confirmed], 1923
- Eastward through Czechoslovakia. Illustrated Review [Not confirmed], 1923
- In the Land of the Ruthvenes. Illustrated Review [Not confirmed], 1924
- Prelate Chancellor. Daily Mail, Date unknown. Reprinted: Otago Daily Times, 6 August 1924
- The Hungarian Forgeries. The Observer, 7 February 1926
