= Dr. Lancelot Priestley =

- First appearance: The Paddington Mystery (1925)
- Last appearance: The Vanishing Diary (1961)
- Created by: John Rhode

In-universe information
- Gender: Male
- Occupation: Forensic investigator
- Family: April Priestley (daughter)
- Nationality: British

Dr. Lancelot Priestley is a fictional investigator in a series of books by John Rhode. After 1924, Dr. Priestley took over from Dr. Thorndyke as the leading fictional forensic investigator in Britain and featured in 72 novels written over 40 years, solving many ingenious and misleading murders.

== Character overview ==
=== Background ===
Priestley was born in July 1869.

Dr. Priestley previously held the chair of Applied Mathematics at a leading Midlands University until he abandoned his chair and retired to the house in Westbourne Terrace, which he inherited from his father. He is described as an independent researcher who delights in scientific controversy. Described in "The Ellerby Case", Dr. Priestley's book "Fact and Fallacy":

..contained in every one of its two hundred odd pages a direct and trenchant attack upon those whom the author was apt to allude to as "The Orthodox Scientific School". and "So the reviews poured in by every post: denunciatory, indignant, sometimes distinctly abusive. And Dr. Priestley would sit and gloat over them, as a primitive warrior might gloat over the blood of his adversaries"

=== Method and process ===
Dr. Priestley's involvement is usually at the request of the police, but only if the case piques his scientific curiosity; having little, or no, interest in criminal justice:

"Hanslet had brought many problems which confronted him in the course of his duties to Dr. Priestley's notice, usually with results highly satisfactory to himself. But in nearly every case Dr. Priestley's interest in the problem ceased when he had solved it to his own satisfaction. The fate of the criminal was a matter of complete unconcern to him. He treated detection much as he would have treated a game of chess. The pieces in the game had no more than a passing interest to him. Not that he was unsympathetic by nature, as many people had good cause to know. But, in the problems which Hanslet set before him, he purposely took a detached and impersonal attitude. Only in this way, as he more than once remarked, was it possible to maintain an impartial judgment"

== Associates and family ==
In the early books, Dr. Priestley assists mainly his friend Chief Inspector Hanslet. In later books, Dr. Priestley becomes an armchair detective and the bulk of the legwork is done by Superintendent Jimmy Waghorn of Scotland Yard and Priestley's secretary and companion, Harold Merefield. Merefield, whom Dr. Priestley cleared of a murder charge in the first book, The Paddington Mystery, is engaged to Dr. Priestley's daughter April. Superintendent Hanslet (now retired) appears in several later works as a dinner guest of Dr. Priestley, passing on his professional wisdom to Waghorn. Lastly, an old friend of Priestley's, Dr. Oldland, in later novels frequently joins the conclave at the professor's Saturday evening dinners and provides the medical viewpoint attendant on the various cases.

== Novels ==
- The Paddington Mystery (1925)
- Dr. Priestley's Quest (1926)
- The Ellerby Case (1927)
- The Murders in Praed Street (1928)
- Tragedy at the Unicorn (1928)
- The House on Tollard Ridge (1929)
- The Davidson Case (1929)
- Peril at Cranbury Hall (1930)
- Pinehurst (1930)
- Tragedy on the Line (1931).
- The Hanging Woman (1931)
- Mystery at Greycombe Farm (1932)
- Dead Men at the Folly (1932)
- The Motor Rally Mystery (1933)
- The Claverton Mystery (1933)
- The Venner Crime (1933)
- The Robthorne Mystery (1934)
- Poison for One (1934)
- Shot at Dawn (1934)
- The Corpse in the Car (1935)
- Hendon's First Case (1935).
- Mystery at Olympia (1935)
- Death at Breakfast (1936)
- In Face of the Verdict (1936)
- Death in the Hopfields (1937)
- Death on the Board (1937)
- Proceed with Caution (1937)
- Invisible Weapons (1938)
- The Bloody Tower (1938)
- Death Pays a Dividend (1939)
- Death on Sunday (1939)
- Death on the Boat Train (1940)
- Murder at Lilac Cottage (1940)
- Death at the Helm (1941)
- They Watched by Night (1941)
- The Fourth Bomb (1942)
- Dead on the Track (1943)
- Men Die at Cyprus Lodge (1943)
- Death Invades the Meeting (1944)
- Vegetable Duck (1944)
- Bricklayer's Arms (1945)
- The Lake House (1946)
- Death in Harley Street (1946)
- Nothing But the Truth (1947)
- Death of an Author (1947)
- The Paper Bag (1948)
- The Telephone Call (1948)
- Blackthorn House (1949)
- Up the Garden Path (1949)
- The Two Graphs (1950)
- Family Affairs (1950)
- The Secret Meeting (1951)
- Doctor Goodwood's Locum (1951)
- Death at the Dance (1952)
- Death in Wellington Road (1952)
- Death at the Inn (1953)
- By Registered Post (1953)
- Death on the Lawn (1954)
- The Dovebury Murders (1954)
- Death of a Godmother (1955)
- The Domestic Agency (1955)
- An Artist Dies (1956)
- Open Verdict (1956)
- Death of a Bridegroom (1957)
- Robbery With Violence (1957)
- Death Takes a Partner (1958)
- Licensed For Murder (1958)
- Murder at Derivale (1958)
- Three Cousins Die (1959)
- The Fatal Pool (1960)
- Twice Dead (1960)
- The Vanishing Diary (1961)

== Radio plays ==
- Dr. Priestley, BBC Empire Service, talk as part of the series 'Meet the Detective', 1935
- The Strange Affair at the Old Dutch Mill, a play featuring Inspector Jimmy Waghorn, BBC National Programme, 7 October 1938, as part of the series 'What Happened at 8:20?"
- Death Travels First, a two-part play featuring Inspector Jimmy Waghorn, BBC Home Service, 2 and 9 July 1940 as part of a series of plays by members of the Detection Club
