= Maurice Richardson =

English journalist and short story writer

Maurice Lane Richardson (1907–1978) was an English journalist and short story writer.

== Early life and education ==
Richardson was born to a wealthy family; his father, a successful stockjobber, "after retirement and some financial ups and downs" moved from "a large house in Essex to another large house in Budleigh Salterton", Devon. As a child, Richardson was sent to prep school, which he disliked, then Oundle School; he later recalled his education in his 1968 book Little Victims. He studied at Oxford in the 1920s, initially reading zoology but subsequently changing to English; he did not take a degree. There he befriended the poet Brian Howard.

== Career ==
After leaving Oxford, he spent some time as an amateur boxer, and wrote his first novel, A Strong Man Needed, a humorous story about a female boxer. Richardson began his journalistic career in the 1930s. After joining the Communist Party, Richardson became a contributor to Left Review and a member of the London-based left-wing Writers and Readers Group which included Tom Wintringham, Randall Swingler, Sylvia Townsend Warner, Mulk Raj Anand, Jean Ross, Arthur Calder-Marshall and Rose Macaulay.

In the late 1940s, Richardson became a contributor to the British magazine Lilliput. Here he published a series of humorous fantasy stories about a "Dwarf Surrealist Boxer" named Engelbrecht. These tales were illustrated by several noted artists, including Ronald Searle, Gerard Hoffnung and James Boswell. The series was collected in book form as The Exploits of Engelbrecht in 1950; it was later reprinted in 1977 and in a deluxe edition by Savoy Books in 2000. David Langford has praised The Exploits of Engelbrecht for their "enjoyable absurdist humour"; J. G. Ballard also admired the stories, describing them as "English surrealism at its greatest. Witty and fantastical, Maurice Richardson was light years ahead of his time. Unmissable."

After leaving the Communist Party in the 1950s, Richardson worked as a book reviewer. Richardson also became known for arranging meetings between himself and other writers in London pubs. Guests at these meetings included Jeffrey Bernard, Daniel Farson, Swingler, Lionel Bart, Frank Norman and Alan Rawsthorne. In the 1960s, he also worked as the Observer's television critic and wrote sports journalism for The Guardian. Richardson also wrote a study of snakes, lizards and other reptiles entitled The Fascination of Reptiles.

After Richardson's death, a posthumous collection of journalism, Fits and Starts, was issued. Reviewing Fits and Starts, Mary Manning praised the book, particularly Richardson's essay on the Moors murders, which she described as "a masterpiece in this genre".

== Personal life ==
Richardson married Bridget Tisdall, whose widowed mother occupied the top half of a house they owned in Paultons Square, Chelsea; the bottom half was for a time occupied by the writer and actress Theodora FitzGibbon and the surrealist painter and photographer Peter Rose Pulham.

== Bibliography ==
=== Fiction ===
- A Strong Man Needed (1931)
- My Bones Will Keep (1932)
- The Bad Companions (1936)
- The Exploits of Engelbrecht, abstracted from the Chronicles of the Surrealist Sportsman's Club (1950)
- Underworld Nights (1956) (published under the pseudonym Charles Raven)

=== Non-Fiction ===
- London's Burning: An account of the experiences of an Auxiliary Fireman (1941).
- Thanatos : a modern symposium (with Philip Toynbee) (1963)
- Little Victims (1968)
- The Fascination of Reptiles (Illustrated by Shaun Milne ) (1973)
- Fits & starts : Collected Pieces (introduction by Julian Symons)

=== As editor ===
- Novels of Mystery from the Victorian Age (1945). Contains: Sheridan Le Fanu (Carmilla), Anon (The Notting Hill Mystery), Wilkie Collins (The Woman in White), Robert Louis Stevenson (Dr. Jekyll and Mr. Hyde).
- Midnight Tales by W. F. Harvey (1946)
- Best Mystery Stories (1968)
- Old Saint Paul's by William Harrison Ainsworth (1968)

== See also ==
- List of short story authors
