= Geoffrey Bles =

British publisher (1886–1957)

- Born: David Geoffrey Bles; 5 September 1886; Chorley, Cheshire, England
- Died: 3 April 1957 (aged 70); London, England
- Education: Merton College, Oxford
- Occupation: Publisher
- Known for: Publisher of the first five The Chronicles of Narnia books
- Spouse: Evelyn Constance Halse

David Geoffrey Bles (5 September 1886 – 3 April 1957) was a British publisher, with a reputation for spotting new talent. He started his eponymous publishing firm in London in 1923 and published the first five books of C. S. Lewis' The Chronicles of Narnia series.

== Early life ==
Bles read Greats at Merton College, Oxford, followed by entry to the Indian Civil Service. During the First World War he was commissioned into the Indian Army Reserve of Officers in October 1917 and was attached to the 17th Cavalry, Indian Army, in November 1917. He served in the Political Department in Mesopotamia in 1918 before demobilisation in June 1919 and returning to the Indian Civil Service. On 3 January 1920, he married Evelyn Constance Halse.

== Publishing career ==
Bles entered publishing in 1923. Geoffrey Bles Limited were general publishers, but with a specialism in religion and translated works. Among the authors Bles published were: C. S. Lewis, J. B. Phillips, Cecil Street, Mabel Lethbridge, Halliday Sutherland, Vicki Baum, and Maria von Trapp.

Baum's Grand Hotel (1930), originally published in German, was a huge commercial success for Bles.

Bles was introduced to C. S. Lewis through his employee Ashley Sampson (1900–1947) who owned the Centenary Press. Bles bought that company and merged it with his own, thus acquiring Lewis as an author. Lewis's key religious work, The Problem of Pain, was published jointly by Bles and Centenary Press in 1940, as were his Beyond Personality: The Christian Idea of God (1944) and The Great Divorce: A Dream (1945).

Bles published on his own Lewis' The Screwtape Letters (1942), The Lion, The Witch and the Wardrobe (1950), and the next four in the Narnia series up to The Horse and his Boy (1954). For the last two books in the series Lewis moved to Bodley Head.

William Collins publishers bought the firm of Geoffrey Bles in 1953, and Bles retired within a year or two. Books continued to be published under the Bles imprint into the 1970s. The Garnstone Press purchased the Geoffrey Bles name from Collins in 1971.

Following his death, correspondents commented in The Times on his personal suitability to the genteel world of literary publishing.

== Outside publishing ==
Bles was a member of the board of Charing Cross Hospital for many years.

His great nephew is the writer William Mortimer Moore whose Free France's Lion: The Life of Philippe Leclerc, de Gaulle's Greatest General was published in 2011 and is dedicated to Bles.
