= Armchair detective =

Genre of detective fiction

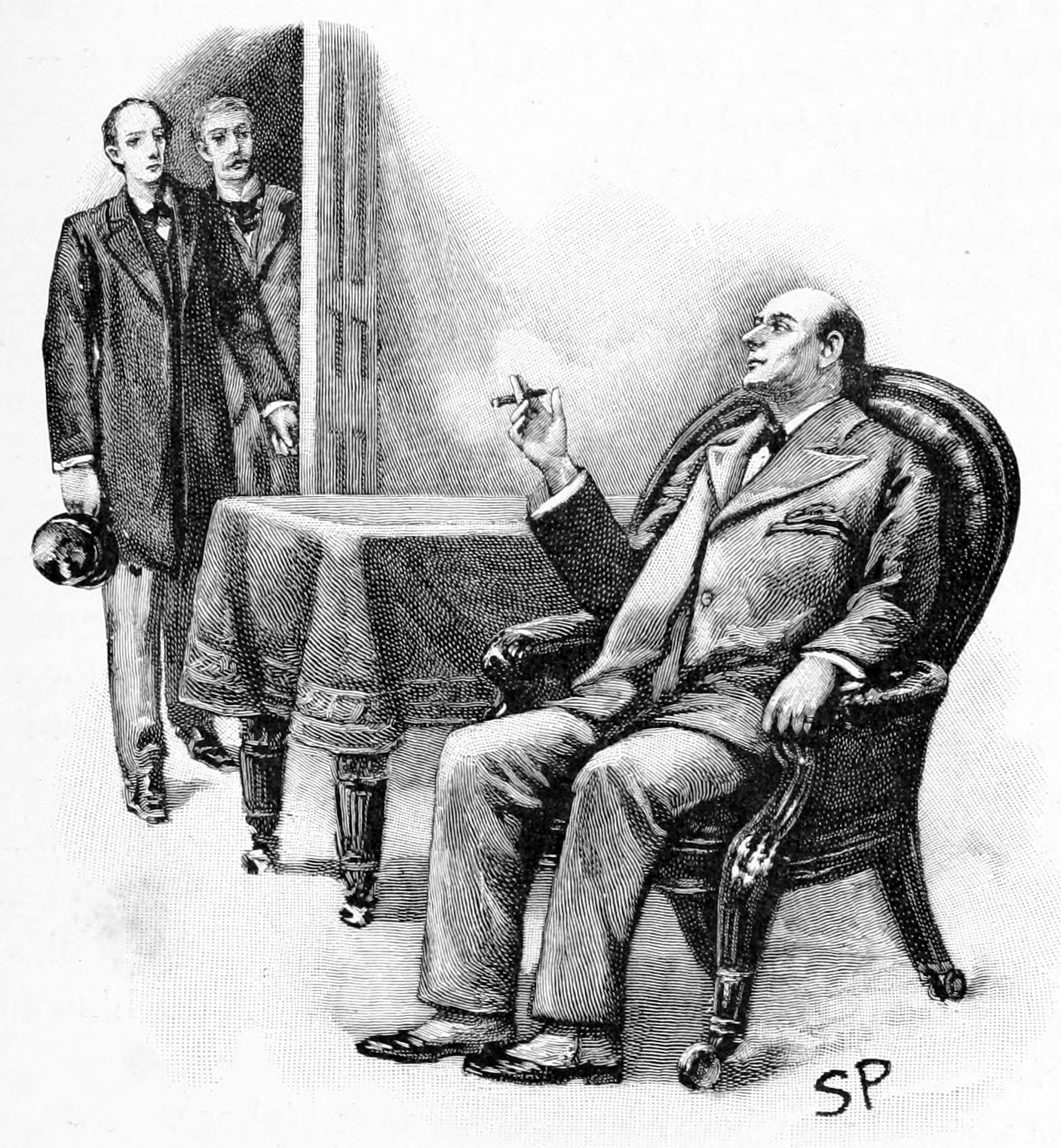
Mycroft Holmes instructing his brother from an armchair, in the story of The Greek Interpreter

An armchair detective is a fictional investigator who does not personally visit a crime scene or interview witnesses; instead, the detective either reads the story of the crime in a newspaper or has it recounted by another person. As the armchair detective never sees any of the investigation, the reader can attempt to solve the mystery on the same terms as the detective.

The phrase possibly originates in a Sherlock Holmes story from 1893, The Greek Interpreter, in which Holmes says of his brother Mycroft, "If the art of the detective began and ended in reasoning from an arm-chair, my brother would be the greatest criminal agent that ever lived."

== Examples of armchair detectives in fiction ==
Early examples of armchair detectives in literature include C. Auguste Dupin in Edgar Allan Poe's The Mystery of Marie Rogêt (1842), who arrives at the correct explanation for a young woman's mysterious disappearance working wholly from newspaper accounts. Amateur detective Tabaret in Émile Gaboriau's Monsieur Lecoq books, published from 1865. Both appear before the introduction of Mycroft in the Sherlock Holmes novels in 1893.

Baroness Orczy's Old Man in the Corner, first appearing in 1901, sits in a restaurant and solves crime cases while talking with an acquaintance. Lancelot Priestley appeared in a long-running series of novels by Cecil Street after making his debut in The Paddington Mystery (1925). A very literal example is Nero Wolfe, created by Rex Stout in 1934, who only leaves his house in exceptional circumstances, typically delegating the legwork for his cases to his assistant. In the novella Before I Die, Wolfe says, "I would be an idiot to leave this chair, made to fit me." Marian Phipps, a character appearing from 1937 in stories by Phyllis Bentley, is a detective novelist who begins solving cases that a policeman friend relates to her.

More recent examples include L Lawliet from Death Note (2004), who reads case files to find unsolved crimes, which he then investigates. Lord El-Melloi II, in the light novel Fate/strange Fake (2006) provides a number of tips and solutions relating to the Holy Grail War taking place in North America, while he is in London.

== Magazine ==
The Armchair Detective magazine was "primarily a mystery fanzine featuring articles, commentary, checklists, bibliographical material, etc., started by the legendary crime fan and bibliographer Allen J. Hubin." It was published from 1967 to 1997.

== Radio and television ==
- Armchair Detective was the title of a British radio series created by Ernest Dudley.
- Armchair Detective was also the title of an early TV series on KTLA, flagship station of the Paramount Television Network (approximately 1949–50).
- Armchair Detectives is the name of a British TV game show hosted by Susan Calman in 2017 on the BBC
