= 1946 in literature =

This article contains information about the literary events and publications of 1946.

== Events ==
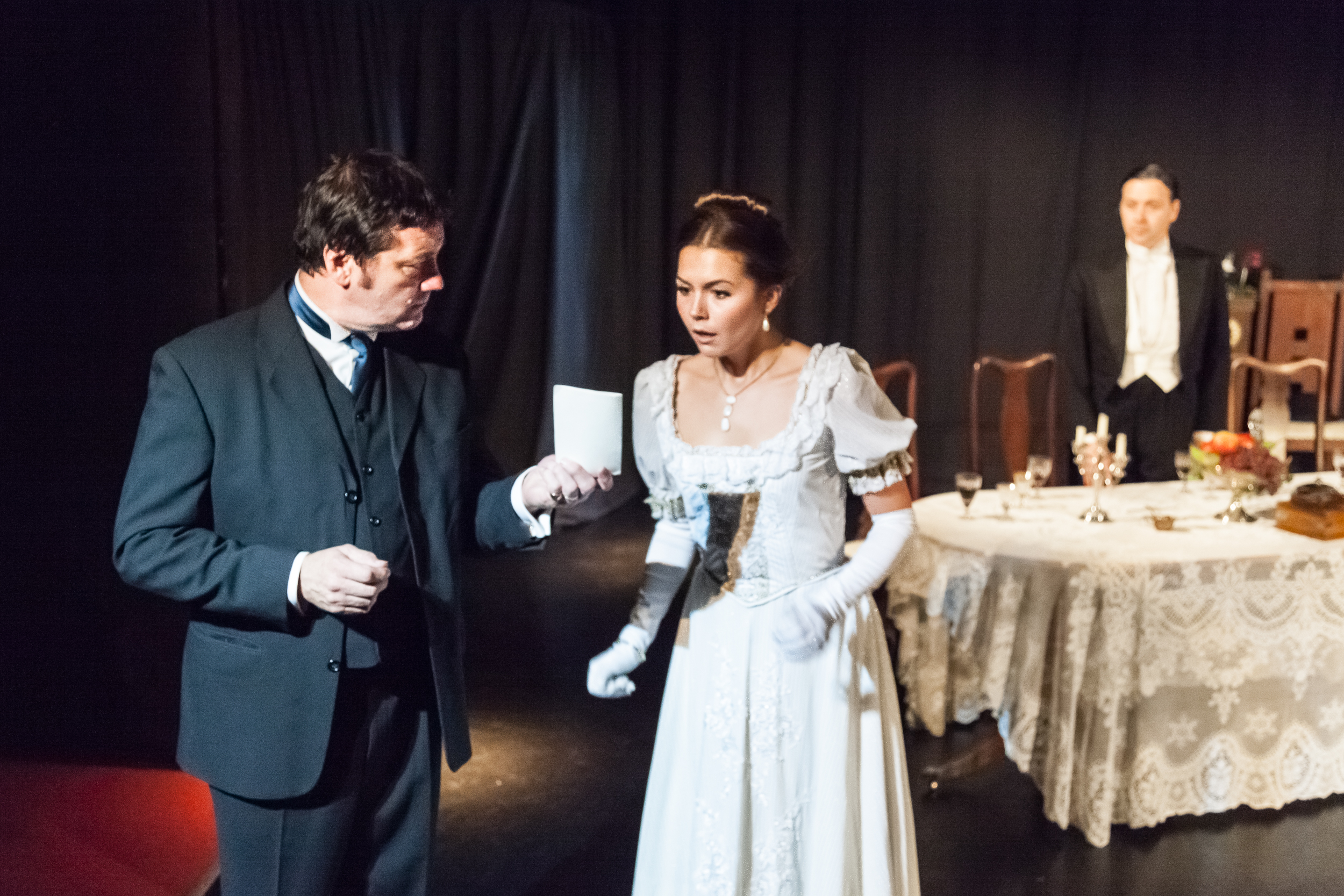
Sheila recognises a picture of Eva presented by the Inspector, as Gerald looks on. A 2012 production of An Inspector Calls by OVO theatre company, St Albans

- January – The Penguin Classics imprint is launched in the United Kingdom under the editorship of E. V. Rieu, whose translation of the Odyssey is the first of the books published, and will be the country's best-selling book over the next decade.
- January 5 – The Estonian writer Jaan Kross is arrested and imprisoned by the occupying Soviet authorities.
- February – The poet Ezra Pound, brought back to the United States on treason charges, is found unfit to face trial due to insanity and sent to St. Elizabeths Hospital, Washington, D.C., where he remains for 12 years.
- May 20 – The English poet W. H. Auden becomes a United States citizen.
- May 22 – George Orwell leaves London to spend much of the next 18 months on the Scottish island of Jura, working on his novel Nineteen Eighty-Four (known at an earlier stage of composition as The Last Man in Europe). This year his Animal Farm becomes book of the year in the United States.
- August 18 – The Assamese poet Amulya Barua is killed aged 24 in communal violence while studying at the University of Calcutta. His only collection of poems, Achina (The Stranger), is published posthumously.
- October 1 – The English premiere of J. B. Priestley's drama An Inspector Calls (set in 1912) is staged at the New Theatre, London. It stars Ralph Richardson.
- October 9 – The Broadway premiere of Eugene O'Neill's drama The Iceman Cometh (set in 1912) is staged at the Martin Beck Theatre, New York City.
- October 10 – Die Chinesische Mauer by Swiss writer Max Frisch, receives its stage premiere.
- November 7 – Walker Percy, a U.S. writer of philosophical novels, marries Mary Bernice Townsend.
- November 8 – The English novelist and diarist Christopher Isherwood becomes a U.S. citizen.
- December 18(
  - Brendan Behan is released from internment in the Republic of Ireland under an amnesty.
  - Damon Runyon's ashes are scattered over New York City from an airplane piloted by Eddie Rickenbacker.
- December 23 – Giovannino Guareschi publishes the first story about the priest Don Camillo in his magazine Candido.
- December 26 – David Lean's film of Great Expectations is released in England.
- unknown dates
  - The publisher August Aimé Balkema produces his first book in South Africa, Vyjtig Gedigte by the poet C. Louis Leipoldt.
  - The American writer and theologian Frederick Buechner resumes his B.A. degree course at Princeton University after war service.

== New books ==
=== Fiction ===
- Jorge Amado – Seara Vermelha
- Francis Ambrière – The Long Holiday (Les Grandes Vacances)
- Charlotte Armstrong – The Unsuspected
- Miguel Ángel Asturias – El Señor Presidente
- René Barjavel – The Tragic Innocents
- Vicki Baum – Mortgage on Life
- Simone de Beauvoir – All Men are Mortal (Tous les hommes sont mortels)
- Algernon Blackwood – The Doll and One Other
- Jorge Luis Borges – Deutsches Requiem
- Tadeusz Borowski – This Way for the Gas, Ladies and Gentlemen (or Ladies and Gentlemen, to the Gas Chamber, originally Pożegnanie z Marią (Farewell to Maria), short stories)
- Phyllis Bottome – The Lifeline
- Christianna Brand – Suddenly at His Residence
- John Bude – Trouble A-Brewing
- Ivan Bunin – Dark Avenues («Тёмные аллеи», Tyomnyye allei, short stories, complete edition)
- John Dickson Carr
  - He Who Whispers
  - My Late Wives (as by Carter Dickson)
- Adolfo Bioy Casares and Silvina Ocampo – Los que aman, odian (Those Who Love, Hate)
- Vera Caspary – Stranger Than Truth
- Peter Cheyney
  - G-Man at the Yard
  - Uneasy Terms
- Agatha Christie – The Hollow
- A. E. Coppard – Fearful Pleasures
- Edmund Crispin – The Moving Toyshop
- Kenneth Fearing – The Big Clock
- Adonias Filho – Os servos da morte
- Errol Flynn – Showdown
- C. S. Forester - Lord Hornblower
- Pat Frank – Mr. Adam
- Carlo Emilio Gadda – That Awful Mess on Via Merulana (Quer pasticciaccio brutto de via Merulana, serial publication)
- Stella Gibbons – Westwood
- Anthony Gilbert – The Spinster's Secret
- Rumer Godden – The River
- William Lindsay Gresham – Nightmare Alley
- Ruth Guimarães – Água Funda (Deep Water, in Paraíba Valley dialect of Brazilian Portuguese)
- João Guimarães Rosa – Sagarana
- Cyril Hare – With a Bare Bodkin
- Thomas Heggen – Mister Roberts
- Raymond J. Healy and J. Francis McComas, editors – Adventures in Time and Space
- George Wylie Henderson – Jule
- William Hope Hodgson – The House on the Borderland and Other Novels
- Robert E. Howard – Skull-Face and Others
- Michael Innes
  - From London Far
  - What Happened at Hazelwood
- Christopher Isherwood – The Berlin Stories
- Cläre Jung – Aus der Tiefe rufe ich
- Nikos Kazantzakis – Zorba the Greek (Βίος και Πολιτεία του Αλέξη Ζορμπά, Life and Times of Alexis Zorbas)
- Arthur Koestler – Thieves in the Night
- Philip Larkin – Jill
- Marghanita Laski (as Sarah Russell) – To Bed with Grand Music
- Violette Leduc – L'Asphyxie (translated as In the Prison of Her Skin)
- Lois Lenski – Strawberry Girl
- Eric Linklater – Private Angelo
- Frank Belknap Long – The Hounds of Tindalos
- E. C. R. Lorac
  - Fire in the Thatch
  - The Theft of the Iron Dogs
- W. Somerset Maugham – Then and Now
- Carson McCullers – Member of the Wedding
- Oscar Micheaux – The Story of Dorothy Stanfield
- A. A. Milne – Chloe Marr
- Gladys Mitchell – Here Comes a Chopper
- Mervyn Peake – Titus Groan (first of the Gormenghast series)
- Ann Petry – The Street
- Isaac Rosenfeld – Passage from Home
- Anya Seton – The Turquoise
- Margit Söderholm – All the World's Delights
- Rex Stout – The Silent Speaker
- Cecil Street
  - Death in Harley Street
  - The Lake House
  - Situation Vacant
- Tugolbay Sydykbekov – Bizdin zamandın kişileri (People of our time)
- Phoebe Atwood Taylor
  - The Asey Mayo Trio
  - Punch with Care
- Ruthven Todd
  - Bodies in a Bookshop
  - The Death Cap
  - Death for Madame
  - Swing Low, Swing Death
- Gore Vidal – Williwaw
- A. E. van Vogt – Slan
- Boris Vian
  - I Spit on Your Graves (J'irai cracher sur vos tombes, as Vernon Sullivan)
  - Vercoquin and the Plankton (Vercoquin et le plancton)
- H. Russell Wakefield – The Clock Strikes Twelve
- Mervyn Wall – The Unfortunate Fursey
- Robert Penn Warren – All the King's Men
- Eudora Welty – Delta Wedding
- Henry S. Whitehead – West India Lights
- Kiichirō Yamate – Momotarō-zamurai (桃太郎侍)
- Ivan Yefremov – The Land of Foam («На краю Ойкумены», Na krayu Oikumeny, At the edge of infinity)
- Seishi Yokomizo – The Honjin Murders (本陣殺人事件, Honjin satsujin jiken)

=== Children and young people ===
- Rev. W. Awdry – Thomas the Tank Engine (second in The Railway Series of 42 books by him and his son Christopher Awdry)
- Carolyn Sherwin Bailey – Miss Hickory
- Nancy Barnes – Wonderful Year
- Enid Blyton – First Term at Malory Towers (first in the Malory Towers series of 6 books)
- Godfried Bomans
  - De Avonturen van Pa Pinkelman (The Adventures of Pa Pinkelman)
  - Sprookjes (The Wily Wizard and the Wicked Witch and other weird stories)
- Jan Brzechwa – Academy of Mr. Kleks (Akademia Pana Kleksa, 1946)
- Gertrude Crampton – Scuffy the Tugboat
- Ernest Elmore – Snuffly Snorty Dog
- William Glynne-Jones – Brecon Adventure
- Elizabeth Goudge – The Little White Horse
- Graham Greene – The Little Train
- Racey Helps – Footprints in the Snow
- Tove Jansson – Comet in Moominland (Kometjakten / Mumintrollet på kometjakt / Kometen kommer)
- Madeleine L'Engle – Ilsa
- Astrid Lindgren – Pippi Goes on Board
- Sheila Stuart – Alison's Highland Holiday (first in the Alison series of 15 books)
- Charles Tazewell – The Littlest Angel
- Ivy Wallace – Pookie (first in the Pookie series of ten books)
- T. H. White – Mistress Masham's Repose

=== Drama ===
- Arthur Adamov – L'Aveu (The Confession)
- Clifford Bax – Golden Eagle
- S. N. Behrman – Jane
- Ugo Betti – Delitto all'isola delle capre (Crime on Goat Island)
- Jean Cocteau – L'Aigle à deux têtes
- Constance Cox – Vanity Fair
- Eduardo De Filippo
  - Filumena Marturano
  - Questi fantasmi (All these ghosts)
- Eynon Evans – Wishing Well
- Christopher Fry – A Phoenix Too Frequent (verse)
- Lillian Hellman - Another Part of the Forest (prequel to The Little Foxes)
- Kenneth Horne – Fools Rush In
- Garson Kanin - Born Yesterday
- Frederick Lonsdale – But for the Grace of God
- Ewan MacColl – Uranium 235
- Donagh MacDonagh – Happy as Larry
- Robert McLeish – The Gorbals Story
- Louis MacNeice – The Dark Tower (radio play)
- Bernard Miles – Let Tyrants Tremble!
- Ronald Millar – Frieda
- Henry de Montherlant – Malatesta
- Eugene O'Neill – The Iceman Cometh
- J. B. Priestley – Ever Since Paradise
- Terence Rattigan – The Winslow Boy
- Nelson Rodrigues – Álbum de família
- Jean-Paul Sartre - The Respectful Prostitute
- Carl Zuckmayer – Des Teufels General (The Devil's General)

=== Poetry ===
- Elizabeth Bishop – North & South
- Josef Čapek (died 1945) – Básně z koncentračního tabora (Poems from a Concentration Camp)
- William Carlos Williams – Paterson, Book One

=== Non-fiction ===
- Erich Auerbach – Mimesis: The Representation of Reality in Western Literature (Mimesis: Dargestellte Wirklichkeit in der abendländischen Literatur)
- Marc Bloch (died 1944) – L'Étrange défaite: Témoignage écrit en 1940 (Strange Defeat: a Statement of Evidence Written in 1940)
- R. G. Collingwood (died 1943) – The Idea of History (collected lectures)
- John Stewart Collis – While Following the Plough
- Viktor Frankl – ...trotzdem Ja zum Leben sagen: Ein Psychologe erlebt das Konzentrationslager (...nevertheless Say 'Yes' to Life: A Psychologist Experiences the Concentration Camp, translated as Man's Search for Meaning)
- Jean Genet – Miracle de la rose
- John Hersey – Hiroshima
- Jens Müller – Tre kom tilbake (Three Came Back)
- George Orwell – Critical Essays (collection)
- Jean-Paul Sartre – Existentialism and Humanism (L'Existentialisme est un humanisme)
- Benjamin Spock – The Common Sense Book of Baby and Child Care
- Władysław Szpilman (as told to Jerzy Waldorff) – Śmierć miasta ("Death of a City", later translated as The Pianist)
- Paramahansa Yogananda – Autobiography of a Yogi

== Births ==
- January 4
  - Lisa Appignanesi, Polish-born author and academic
  - Ramsey Campbell, English horror writer
- January 19 – Julian Barnes, English writer
- January 21 – Gretel Ehrlich, American travel writer, poet and essayist
- February 7 – Brian Patten, English poet
- February 25 – Franz Xaver Kroetz, German dramatist
- March 1 – Jim Crace, English author
- March 5 – Mem Fox (Merrion Frances Partridge), Australian children's writer
- April 2 – Sue Townsend, English comic novelist and playwright (died 2014)
- April 29 – Humphrey Carpenter, English biographer, children's fiction writer and radio broadcaster (died 2005)
- May 8 – Ruth Padel, English poet and author
- May 11 – Valerie Grove, English journalist and author
- May 12 – L. Neil Smith, American author and activist
- June 28 – John Birtwhistle, English poet and librettist
- July 22 – Ryoki Inoue, born José Carlos Ryoki de Alpoim Inoue, prolific Brazilian novelist
- July 26 – Joel Mokyr, Israeli economic historian
- July 28 – Fahmida Riaz, Pakistani writer
- August 1 – Paul Torday, English novelist (died 2013)
- August 2 – James Howe, American journalist and author of juvenile fiction
- August 29 – Leona Gom, Canadian poet and novelist
- September 12 – Neil Lyndon, English journalist and author of No More Sex War: The Failures of Feminism
- September 26 – Andrea Dworkin, American writer and activist (died 2005)
- October 1 – Tim O'Brien, American novelist
- October 4 - Susan Sarandon American actress
- October 19 - Philip Pullman, English author
- October 20 – Elfriede Jelinek, Austrian novelist and Nobel laureate
- October 28 – Sharon Thesen, Canadian poet
- November 7 – Diane Francis, Canadian journalist and author
- November 18 – Alan Dean Foster, American science fiction author
- November 25 – Marc Brown, author and creator of Arthur
- December 2 – Ibrahim Abdel Meguid, Egyptian novelist
- December 4 – Maria Antònia Oliver Cabrer, Majorca-born Spanish Catalan fiction writer
- December 11 – Ellen Meloy, American nature writer (died 2004)
- Uncertain date – Sarah Harrison, English novelist and children's writer

== Deaths ==
- January 6 – Dion Fortune, British occultist, Christian Qabalist, ceremonial magician and novelist (born 1890)
- February 11 – John Langalibalele Dube, South African Zulu writer (born 1871)
- March 19 – Catherine Carswell, Scottish novelist and biographer (born 1879)
- March 20 – Henry Handel Richardson (Ethel Florence Lindesay Richardson), Australian novelist (born 1870)
- April 1 – Edward Sheldon, American dramatist (born 1886)
- April 11 – Dem. Theodorescu, Romanian novelist and journalist (born 1888)
- May 19 – Booth Tarkington, American novelist and dramatist (born 1869)
- May 20 – Jane Findlater, Scottish novelist (born 1866)
- May 25 – Ernest Rhys, English writer and book series editor of Welsh extraction (born 1859)
- Summer – Ștefan Foriș, Hungarian and Romanian journalist and communist activist (murdered, born 1892)
- June 6 – Gerhart Hauptmann, German dramatist, novelist and poet, winner of the Nobel Prize in Literature (born 1862)
- July 8 – Orrick Glenday Johns, American poet and playwright (born 1887)
- July 22 – Edward Sperling, Russian-born American humorist (killed by bomb, born 1889)
- July 27 – Gertrude Stein, American novelist, poet and dramatist (born 1874)
- July 30 – Nikolai Alexandrovich Morozov, Russian poet and revolutionary (born 1854)
- August 13 – H. G. Wells, English novelist (born 1866)
- August 18 – Marion Angus, Scottish poet (born 1865)
- August 31 – Harley Granville-Barker, English actor, dramatist and critic (born 1877)
- September 9 – Violet Jacob, Scottish historical novelist and poet (born 1863)
- September 21 – Lydia J. Newcomb Comings, American author, educator, lecturer (born 1850)
- September 26 – William Strunk, Jr., American professor of English (born 1869)
- November 5 – Thomas Scott-Ellis, 8th Baron Howard de Walden, English author and patron of the arts(born 1880)
- November 14 – May Sinclair, English novelist (born 1863)
- December 10 – Damon Runyon, American short-story writer (born 1880)
- December 17 – Constance Garnett, English translator (born 1861)
- December 23 – Ellen Marriage, English translator (born 1865)

== Awards ==
- Carnegie Medal for children's literature: Elizabeth Goudge, The Little White Horse
- James Tait Black Memorial Prize:
  - Fiction: Oliver Onions, Poor Man's Tapestry
  - Biography: Richard Aldington, Wellington
- Newbery Medal for children's literature: Lois Lenski, Strawberry Girl
- Nobel Prize in Literature: Hermann Hesse
- Premio Nadal: José María Gironella, Un hombre
- Prix Goncourt: Jean-Jacques Gautier, Histoire d'un fait divers
- Pulitzer Prize:
  - Drama: Russel Crouse, Howard Lindsay, State of the Union
  - Poetry: no award given
  - Novel: no award given
- Hugo Award:
  - Best Novella: George Orwell, Animal Farm
