= Detective (TV series) =

British TV mystery anthology series (1964–1969)

- Genre: Anthology; Crime; Mystery
- Country of origin: United Kingdom
- Original language: English
- No. of series: 3
- No. of episodes: 45

Production
- Running time: 50 minutes

Original release
- Network: BBC
- Release: 30 March 1964 – 9 November 1969

Detective is a British mystery anthology television series adapted from stories by numerous prominent crime fiction writers, with each episode focusing on a particular detective character. Several prominent fictional sleuths were showcased, including Sherlock Holmes, Dr. John Thorndyke, Philip Trent, Sir Henry Merrivale, Roderick Alleyn, Father Brown, Albert Campion, C. Auguste Dupin, Sir John Appleby, Inspector Ghote, Nigel Strangeways and Gervase Fen.

Each episode of the first series was introduced by Rupert Davies, in-character as Inspector Maigret, reprising his role from the eponymous BBC series that had aired from 1960 to 1963. Several episodes functioned as Backdoor pilots for potential future series. Of the 45 episodes, only three such shows were produced as a result: Cluff (1964–65) starring Leslie Sands, Thorndyke (1964) starring Peter Copley, and Sherlock Holmes (1965–68) starring Douglas Wilmer, and later, Peter Cushing.

Of the eighteen episodes from the first series twelve are currently known to exist; nine episodes from series two survive; while only one episode from the third series remains in the archive.

== Recurring characters ==
Characters who appeared in more than one episode:

- Glyn Houston and Bernard Horsfall as Nigel Strangeways (2 episodes)
- David Horne and Martin Wyldeck as Sir Henry Merrivale (2 episodes)
- Michael Hordern and John Welsh as Detective Inspector Rason (2 episodes)
- Geoffrey Keen and Michael Allinson as Roderick Alleyn (2 episodes)
- Dennis Price and Ian Ogilvy as Sir John Appleby (2 episodes)
- Patrick Troughton and Colin Blakely as Jasper Shrig (2 episodes)
- Jane Merrow and Penelope Horner as Eve Gill (2 episodes)
- Lee Montague as Fred Fellows (2 episodes). Montague is the only actor to reappear in the same role.
- Derek Godfrey and Edward Woodward as Commissaire Bignon (2 episodes). Woodward had previously played C. Auguste Dupin.

== List of episodes ==
=== Series One ===
No.	Title	Original author(s)	Detective(s)	Actor(s) who portrayed detective(s)	Ref.	Status
1.1	The Moving Toyshop	Edmund Crispin	Gervase Fen, Oxford professor	Richard Wordsworth		Missing
1.2	The Drawing	Gil North	Detective Sergeant Caleb Cluff, Yorkshire policeman	Leslie Sands		Missing, spawned a series
1.3	Trent's Last Case	E. C. Bentley	Philip Trent, journalist	Michael Gwynn		Missing
1.4	End of Chapter	Nicholas Blake	Nigel Strangeways, private detective	Glyn Houston		Survives
1.5	The Judas Window	Carter Dickson	Sir Henry Merrivale, amateur detective	David Horne		Missing
1.6	Dishonoured Bones	John Trench	Martin Cotterill, archeologist	Alan Dobie		Survives
1.7	The Man Who Murdered in Public	Roy Vickers	Detective Inspector Rason, officer of "The Department of Dead Ends"	Michael Hordern		Missing
1.8	The Speckled Band	Arthur Conan Doyle	Sherlock Holmes, consulting detective	Douglas Wilmer		Survives, spawned a series
1.9	The Night of the Horns	Douglas Sanderson	Robert Race, lawyer	Frank Lieberman		Survives
1.10	Subject: Murder	Clifford Witting	Inspector Charlton and Peter Bradford	Basil Dignam and Mark Eden		Survives
1.11	Death in Ecstasy	Ngaio Marsh	Roderick Alleyn, police inspector	Geoffrey Keen		Survives
1.12	A Connoisseur's Case	Michael Innes	Sir John Appleby, police officer	Dennis Price		Survives
1.13	The Loring Mystery	Jeffery Farnol	Jasper Shrig, Georgian era hero	Patrick Troughton		Survives
1.14	The Hungry Spider	Selwyn Jepson	Eve Gill	Jane Merrow		Survives
1.15	The Case of Oscar Brodski	R. Austin Freeman	Dr. John Thorndyke, Forensic sleuth	Peter Copley		Survives, spawned a series
1.16	The Speaking Eye	Clark Smith	Nicky Mahoun, accountant	Frederick Jaeger		Survives
1.17	Death of a Fellow Traveller	Delano Ames	Dagobert and Jane Brown, married investigators	Leslie Randall and Joan Reynolds		Survives
1.18	The Quick One	G.K. Chesterton	Father Brown, Roman Catholic priest	Mervyn Johns		Missing

=== Series Two ===
No.	Title	Original author(s)	Detective(s)	Actor(s) who portrayed detective(s)	Ref.	Status
2.1	The Deadly Climate	Ursula Curtiss	Robert Carmichael, reporter	Dudley Sutton		Missing
2.2	Dover and the Deadly Poison Pen Letters	Joyce Porter	Inspector Wilfred Dover, irascible police officer	Paul Dawkins		Survives
2.3	A Man and His Mother-In-Law	Roy Vickers	Detective Inspector Rason, officer of "The Department of Dead Ends"	John Welsh		Survives
2.4	Lesson in Anatomy	Michael Innes	Sir John Appleby, police officer	Ian Ogilvy		Missing
2.5	The German Song	H.C. Bailey	Reggie Fortune, police consultant	Denholm Elliott		Survives
2.6	The Beast Must Die	Nicholas Blake	Nigel Strangeways, private detective	Bernard Horsfall		Survives
2.7	The Avenging Chance	Anthony Berkeley	Roger Sheringham, amateur sleuth	John Carson		Survives
2.8	Born Victim	Hillary Waugh	Fred Fellows, police officer	Lee Montague		Missing
2.9	The Unquiet Sleep	William Haggard	Rachel Borrowdaile and Colonel Charles Russell, government agents	Sarah Lawson and Roland Culver		Survives
2.10	The High Adventure	Jeffery Farnol	Jasper Shrig, Georgian era hero	Colin Blakely		Survives
2.11	Cork on the Water	Macdonald Hastings	Montague Cork, insurance agent	Colin Douglas		Survives
2.12	The Case of the Late Pig	Margery Allingham	Albert Campion, gentleman detective	Brian Smith		Survives
2.13	The Golden Dart	Selwyn Jepson	Eve Gill	Penelope Horner		Survives
2.14	Crime of Passion	Colin Morris (dramatization of the real-life Dr. Crippen case)	Walter Dew	Glynn Edwards		Missing
2.15	Artists in Crime	Ngaio Marsh	Roderick Alleyn, police inspector	Michael Allinson		Missing
2.16	Deaths on the Champs Elysees	Francis Didelot	Commissaire Bignon	Derek Godfrey		Survives
2.17	The Murders in the Rue Morgue	Edgar Allan Poe	C. Auguste Dupin, French detective	Edward Woodward		Missing

=== Series Three ===
No.	Title	Original author(s)	Detective(s)	Actor(s) who portrayed detective(s)	Ref.	Status
3.1	The Prisoner's Plea	Hillary Waugh	Fred Fellows, police officer	Lee Montague		Survives
3.2	The Singing Sands	Josephine Tey	Inspector Alan Grant, policeman	John Carson		Missing
3.3	The Public School Murder	R.C. Woodthorpe	Sir Luke Frinsby	Cyril Luckham		Missing
3.4	Put Out the Light	Ethel Lina White	Miss Pye	Angela Baddeley		Missing
3.5	The Tea-Leaf	Edgar Jepson and Robert Eustace	Ruth Kelstem	Hannah Gordon		Missing
3.6	Hunt the Peacock	H.R.F. Keating	Inspector Ganesh Ghote, Bombay policeman	Zia Mohyeddin		Missing
3.7	Elimination Round	Ludovic Peters	Ian Firth and John Smith	David Buck and Meredith Edwards		Missing
3.8	And So to Murder	Carter Dickson	Sir Henry Merrivale, amateur detective	Martin Wyldeck		Missing
3.9	The Poisoners	Francis Didelot	Commissaire Bignon	Edward Woodward		Missing
3.10	Mr. Guppy's Tale	Charles Dickens	William Guppy, law clerk	Bill Fraser		Missing
