= Coppard =

Coppard is a surname. Notable people with the surname include:

- A. E. Coppard (1878–1957), British writer and poet
- George Coppard (1898–1985), British soldier
- Oliver Coppard (born 1981), British politician
