= A Private View =

1952 novel

- Author: Michael Innes
- Language: English
- Series: Sir John Appleby
- Genre: Detective
- Publisher: Gollancz; Dodd, Mead (US)
- Publication date: 1952
- Publication place: United Kingdom
- Media type: Print
- Preceded by: Operation Pax
- Followed by: Appleby Talking

A Private View is a 1952 detective novel by the British writer Michael Innes. It is the thirteenth in his series featuring John Appleby, now an Assistant Commissioner in the Metropolitan Police. It also features the characters of Inspector Cadover and the Duke of Horton who had previously appeared in What Happened at Hazelwood and Hamlet, Revenge! respectively. Appleby's wife Judith also plays a major role in the story.

== Synopsis ==
London, 1951. Appleby accompanies his wife to a Private view at an art gallery featuring an exhibition of paintings by a young artist murdered several days earlier. While he is there, the last work ever painted by him is stolen in plain view, which Appleby at first takes to be part of a publicity stunt by the gallery's owner. Intrigued, he visits the late painter's studio just off the King's Road in Chelsea. There he discovers a work by Stubbs which soon proves to have recently been stolen from a country house.

Before long Appleby is plunged into considerable danger, as he runs across the stolen canvas that three different gangs are after for their differing reasons, including international spies. Judith Appleby takes up the investigation herself and then takes part in a cross-country police pursuit to come to her husband's assistance.

== Bibliography ==
- Hubin, Allen J. Crime Fiction, 1749-1980: A Comprehensive Bibliography. Garland Publishing, 1984.
- Reilly, John M. Twentieth Century Crime & Mystery Writers. Springer, 2015.
- Scheper, George L. Michael Innes. Ungar, 1986.
