= Appleby at Allington =

1968 novel

- First Edition
- Author: Michael Innes
- Language: English
- Series: Sir John Appleby
- Genre: Detective
- Publisher: Gollancz; Dodd, Mead (US)
- Publication date: 1968
- Publication place: United Kingdom
- Media type: Print
- Preceded by: The Bloody Wood
- Followed by: A Family Affair

Appleby at Allington is a 1968 detective novel by the British writer Michael Innes. It is the twentieth in his long-running series featuring Sir John Appleby of Scotland Yard, now retired. It takes the form of a Golden Age country house mystery with elements of farce. It was released in the United States by Dodd, Mead under the alternative title Death by Water.

A review in the Times Literary Supplement described it as a "tasty, vintagey Innes, with the only disadvantage that he doesn't allow himself space to develop the many engaging characters and plot potentials".

== Synopsis ==
While dining at Allington Park, the home of his neighbour Owain Allington who has recently reacquired his family's ancestral estates, Appleby and his host discover the body of Allington's nephew Martin in the control booth of the Son et lumière set up ahead of the garden fête being held the next day.

== Bibliography ==
- Hubin, Allen J. Crime Fiction, 1749-1980: A Comprehensive Bibliography. Garland Publishing, 1984.
- Reilly, John M. Twentieth Century Crime & Mystery Writers. Springer, 2015.
- Scheper, George L. Michael Innes. Ungar, 1986.
