= The Man from the Sea =

The Man from the Sea may refer to:

- The Man from the Sea (short story), a 1930 short story by Agatha Christie
- The Man from the Sea (novel), a 1955 thriller novel by Michael Innes
