= The Journeying Boy =

1949 mystery novel by Michael Innes

The Case of the Journeying Boy
- Author: Michael Innes
- Language: English
- Genre: Mystery fiction, crime fiction
- Publication date: 1949
- Media type: Print
- Pages: 288
- ISBN: 9780060806323 1991 Paperback edition

The Journeying Boy is a 1949 mystery novel by Michael Innes. It was number 52 in The Top 100 Crime Novels of All Time list, despite not involving Innes's main character, Sir John Appleby.

== Plot summary ==
The blurb bills reads,

Humphrey Paxton, the son of one of Britain's leading atomic boffins, has taken to carrying a shotgun to 'shoot plotters and blackmailers and spies'. His new tutor, the plodding Mr Thewless, suggests that Humphrey might be overdoing it somewhat. But when a man is found shot dead at a cinema, Mr Thewless is plunged into a nightmare world of lies, kidnapping and murder - and grave matters of national security.
