= Stop Press (novel) =

1939 novel

- American first edition
- Author: Michael Innes
- Language: English
- Series: Sir John Appleby
- Genre: Detective
- Publisher: Gollancz; Dodd, Mead (US)
- Publication date: 1939
- Publication place: United Kingdom
- Media type: Print
- Preceded by: Lament for a Maker
- Followed by: The Secret Vanguard

Stop Press is a 1939 mystery detective novel by the British writer Michael Innes. It is the fourth in his series featuring John Appleby Detective Inspector of Scotland Yard. It was written during the Golden Age of Detective Fiction and was first published by Victor Gollancz and in America by Dodd Mead under the alternative title The Spider Strikes. A country house mystery, it is the only novel in the series in which Appleby's sister Patricia appears.

== Plot ==
Gentleman writer Richard Eliot's extremely popular fictional character The Spider seems to have come to life, performing a series of crimes and practical jokes apparently drawn from the author's subconscious. It seems probable that somebody wishes to drive him out of his mind and prevent the publication of his next novel, the thirty eighth in the series, by making him cry "stop press" to his publisher. His son brings several guests down for a weekend party at his estate Rust Hall, including an Oxford University professor and Appleby who is perplexed by the strange series of events and fears that an attempted murder is imminent. Once the setting shifts to nearby Shroom Abbey and its sinister owner things take a more violent turn and it is at last time for Appleby's convoluted unravelling of the case.

== Bibliography ==
- Breen, John L. What about Murder?: A Guide to Books about Mystery and Detective Fiction. 1981-1991. Scarecrow Press, 1993.
- Hubin, Allen J. Crime Fiction, 1749–1980: A Comprehensive Bibliography. Garland Publishing, 1984.
- Reilly, John M. Twentieth Century Crime & Mystery Writers. Springer, 2015.
- Scheper, George L. Michael Innes. Ungar, 1986.
