= The Bloody Wood =

1966 novel by Michael Innes

- American First Edition
- Author: Michael Innes
- Language: English
- Series: Sir John Appleby
- Genre: Detective
- Publisher: Gollancz; Dodd, Mead (US)
- Publication date: 1966
- Publication place: United Kingdom
- Media type: Print
- Preceded by: A Connoisseur's Case
- Followed by: Appleby at Allington

The Bloody Wood is a 1966 detective novel by the British writer Michael Innes. It is the nineteenth in his long-running series featuring Sir John Appleby of Scotland Yard. It takes the form of a Golden Age-style country house mystery.

== Synopsis ==
Appleby and his wife Judith are amongst the guests at Charne, the estate of Charles Martineau. Martineau's wife Grace is very ill, and one of her final requests is that her husband should marry her favourite niece Martine. When both Grace and Charles die on the same day, Apple steps in to investigate.

== Bibliography ==
- Hubin, Allen J. Crime Fiction, 1749-1980: A Comprehensive Bibliography. Garland Publishing, 1984.
- Reilly, John M. Twentieth Century Crime & Mystery Writers. Springer, 2015.
- Scheper, George L. Michael Innes. Ungar, 1986.
