= Appleby's End =

1945 novel

- First Edition Cover
- Author: Michael Innes
- Language: English
- Series: Sir John Appleby
- Genre: Detective
- Publisher: Gollancz; Dodd, Mead (US)
- Publication date: 1945
- Publication place: United Kingdom
- Media type: Print
- Preceded by: The Weight of the Evidence
- Followed by: A Night of Errors

Appleby's End is a 1945 detective novel by the British writer Michael Innes. It is the tenth in his series featuring John Appleby, a young Detective Inspector in the Metropolitan Police. The plot has some similarities to a country house mystery taking part in rural England, but as with much of the author's work this is mixed with a complex plot and a variety of farcical incidents and characters. As is common for novels in the genre, no mention is made of the ongoing Second World War. Taking place over little more than twenty four hours, it ends with Appleby engaged to be married and planning to retire from the police force.

== Synopsis ==
Travelling in bad weather on a very slow stopping train through the English countryside, Appleby encounters Everard Raven a compiler of encyclopaedias and the senior member of a prominent local family. Insisting that Appleby is very likely to miss the branch line connection, he invites him to stay at his country estate. When they arrive at the small village station, appropriately named Appleby's End, the Inspector soon encounters various other members of the eccentric but friendly Raven family, all artistically inclined. In particular when they are separated from the others he bonds with Judith, an attractive young sculptor, when they have to shelter in a haystack from the cold.

Things are brought into a more serious mood when the body of Heyhoe, an old family servant and likely half-brother of Everard Raven, is found buried up to his neck in snow. Judith explains that this is the latest in a series of bizarre incidents which seem to closely resemble the stories of Everard Raven's long-dead father, a Victorian writer of melodramatic tales. Even his own arrival seems to closely echo one of the plots. Appleby quickly discovers that the various happenings, including a prize bull turning into stone, a local boy gone missing and the apparent practice of witchcraft in the area, may all have a more logical explanation.

== See also ==
- Golden Age of Detective Fiction

== Bibliography ==
- Hubin, Allen J. Crime Fiction, 1749-1980: A Comprehensive Bibliography. Garland Publishing, 1984.
- Reilly, John M. Twentieth Century Crime & Mystery Writers. Springer, 2015.
- Scheper, George L. Michael Innes. Ungar, 1986.
