= The New Sonia Wayward =

1960 novel

- Author: Michael Innes
- Language: English
- Genre: Thriller
- Publisher: Gollancz; Dodd, Mead (US)
- Publication date: 1960
- Publication place: United Kingdom
- Media type: Print

The New Sonia Wayward is a 1960 thriller novel by the British writer Michael Innes. It was published in the United States by Dodd, Mead under the alternative title The Case of Sonia Wayward. It is an inverted detective story with comedy elements, with the focus on the murderous protagonist. It was one of several standalone novels by Innes, who was best known for his series featuring the Golden Age detective John Appleby. Maurice Richardson writing in The Observer felt it "rather light for a suspense story but most pleasingly written."

== Synopsis ==
A retired colonel is married to a bullying tyrant who also happens to be a bestselling novelist. While on a sailing trip with his wife in the English Channel he throws her overboard. However, well-practiced in her style of writing, he continues to produce her novels to considerable success.

== Bibliography ==
- Hubin, Allen J. Crime Fiction, 1749-1980: A Comprehensive Bibliography. Garland Publishing, 1984.
- Reilly, John M. Twentieth Century Crime & Mystery Writers. Springer, 2015.
- Scheper, George L. Michael Innes. Ungar, 1986.
