= From London Far =

1946 novel

- First Edition
- Author: Michael Innes
- Language: English
- Genre: Thriller
- Publisher: Gollancz; Dodd, Mead (US)
- Publication date: 1946
- Publication place: United Kingdom
- Media type: Print

From London Far is a 1946 mystery thriller novel by the British writer Michael Innes. It is a standalone novel from the author who was best known for his series featuring the Golden Age detective John Appleby. Like much of Innes' work it contains elements of farcical humour. It was published the same year in the United States by Dodd, Mead under the alternative title The Unsuspected Chasm.

Writing in the New Statesman, reviewer Ralph Partridge noted "The casual intrusion of a literary don into a den of thieves starts the ball rolling. As there is a plot I say no more. But the book is called a thriller, and anyone who has read The Daffodil Affair knows what liberties Michael Innes allows himself under that heading."

== Synopsis ==
A chance encounter in a London tobacconists leads to a professor of English literature being mistaken for a member of an organisation trying to corner the market in stolen art works.

== Bibliography ==
- Hubin, Allen J. Crime Fiction, 1749-1980: A Comprehensive Bibliography. Garland Publishing, 1984.
- Reilly, John M. Twentieth Century Crime & Mystery Writers. Springer, 2015.
- Scheper, George L. Michael Innes. Ungar, 1986.
