= A Night of Errors =

1947 novel

- American First Edition
- Author: Michael Innes
- Language: English
- Series: Sir John Appleby
- Genre: Detective
- Publisher: Gollancz; Dodd, Mead (US)
- Publication date: 1947
- Publication place: United Kingdom
- Media type: Print
- Preceded by: Appleby's End
- Followed by: Operation Pax

A Night of Errors is a 1947 detective novel by the British writer Michael Innes. It is the eleventh in his series featuring John Appleby, recently a Detective Inspector in the Metropolitan Police but currently living in an early retirement in the English countryside. It takes the form of a country house mystery with an extremely complex plot, laced with strong elements of farce common throughout the series.

== Synopsis ==
The once wealthy Dromio family of Sherris Hall is in financial trouble and the current baronet Sir Oliver is in America. His mother throws a small dinner party inviting a near neighbour, her brother-in-law Sir Sebastian Dromio as well as her adopted daughter Lucy. When the body of Sir Oliver turns up after dinner partially burnt in the fireplace in his study Inspector Hyland of the local force calls on the assistance of the famed Appleby. The case proves utterly baffling, and proves only more so as the bodies pile up. A drunken Sir Sebastian shoots Grubb the head gardener, who appeared about to reveal some vital clue and then a major fire consumes much of the house in flames. The whole case seems to have its roots in another mysterious fire forty years earlier, started by the insane Sir Romeo Dromio, that apparently killed Oliver's two triplets.

== Bibliography ==
- Hubin, Allen J. Crime Fiction, 1749-1980: A Comprehensive Bibliography. Garland Publishing, 1984.
- Reilly, John M. Twentieth Century Crime & Mystery Writers. Springer, 2015.
- Scheper, George L. Michael Innes. Ungar, 1986.
