= What Happened at Hazelwood =

1946 novel

- First Edition
- Author: Michael Innes
- Language: English
- Genre: Detective
- Publisher: Gollancz; Dodd, Mead (US)
- Publication date: 1946
- Publication place: United Kingdom
- Media type: Print

What Happened at Hazelwood is a 1946 detective novel by the British writer Michael Innes. It is a standalone novel from the author who was best known for his series featuring the Golden Age detective John Appleby. In this novel his role is fulfilled by Inspector Cadover who also appeared later in an Appleby novel A Private View. It takes the form of a country house mystery. Ralph Partridge writing in the New Statesman observed "Michael Innes may be a Professor of English in disguise but What Happened at Hazelwood would never win him a Chair of Detection. I suppose we should be grateful that it is not a surrealist thriller, and that Inspector Appleby is off duty."

== Synopsis ==
Sir George Simney, baronet and owner of Hazelwood Hall, is found dead in his library during the middle of a snowstorm. The house is crowded with his relatives who all detest him, but it is hard to see how any of them had the opportunity to do it. Much of the story is narrated by Simney's wife, a former actress who despised him but insists she didn't murder him.

== Bibliography ==
- Hubin, Allen J. Crime Fiction, 1749-1980: A Comprehensive Bibliography. Garland Publishing, 1984.
- Reilly, John M. Twentieth Century Crime & Mystery Writers. Springer, 2015.
- Scheper, George L. Michael Innes. Ungar, 1986.
