= There Came Both Mist and Snow =

1940 novel

- First Edition
- Author: Michael Innes
- Language: English
- Series: Sir John Appleby
- Genre: Detective
- Publisher: Gollancz; Dodd, Mead (US)
- Publication date: 1940
- Publication place: United Kingdom
- Media type: Print
- Preceded by: The Secret Vanguard
- Followed by: Appleby on Ararat

There Came Both Mist and Snow is a 1940 detective novel by the British writer Michael Innes. It is the sixth in his series featuring John Appleby, a Detective Inspector in the Metropolitan Police. The title is a reference to a line from The Rime of the Ancient Mariner by Samuel Taylor Coleridge. It is a country house mystery told in a first person narrative by Arthur Ferryman, one of the guests at a family gathering and witness to the events. It makes no mention of the ongoing Second World War. It was published in the United States by Dodd, Mead under the alternative title A Comedy of Terrors.

== Synopsis ==
The extended family of Sir Basil Roper gather to spend Christmas at Belrive Priory, a historic property in Yorkshire which has rapidly been encroached on by the industrial growth of the town and is now dominated by a nearby cotton mill and brewery. When one of the guests of Sir Basil is found shot in while sitting in the chair in his study, Appleby who happens to have arrived as a visitor takes charge of the investigation. Although the victim is at first taken to be dead, he is in fact badly wounded. Wild theories and accusations fly between the respective members of the family, and the two nearby industrialists, while Appleby tries to pin down the solution to the case which he believes may be revealed by a line of poetry.

== Bibliography ==
- Hubin, Allen J. Crime Fiction, 1749–1980: A Comprehensive Bibliography. Garland Publishing, 1984.
- Reilly, John M. Twentieth Century Crime & Mystery Writers. Springer, 2015.
- Scheper, George L. Michael Innes. Ungar, 1986.
