= A Connoisseur's Case =

1962 novel by Michael Innes

- First Edition
- Author: Michael Innes
- Language: English
- Series: Sir John Appleby
- Genre: Detective
- Publisher: Gollancz; Dodd, Mead (US)
- Publication date: 1962
- Publication place: United Kingdom
- Media type: Print
- Preceded by: Silence Observed
- Followed by: The Bloody Wood

A Connoisseur's Case is a 1962 detective novel by the British writer Michael Innes. It is the eighteenth in his series featuring John Appleby of Scotland Yard. It is a country house mystery, harking back to the Golden Age of Detective Fiction. It was released in the United States by Dodd, Mead under the alternative title The Crabtree Affair. It was adapted into an episode of the television series Detective with Appleby played by Dennis Price.

== Bibliography ==
- Hubin, Allen J. Crime Fiction, 1749-1980: A Comprehensive Bibliography. Garland Publishing, 1984.
- Reilly, John M. Twentieth Century Crime & Mystery Writers. Springer, 2015.
- Scheper, George L. Michael Innes. Ungar, 1986.
