= Unholy Dying =

1945 novel

- First edition
- Author: Ruthven Todd
- Language: English
- Series: Professor John Stubbs
- Genre: Mystery
- Publisher: John Westhouse
- Publication date: 1945
- Publication place: United Kingdom
- Media type: Print
- Followed by: Take Thee a Sharp Knife

Unholy Dying is a 1945 mystery detective novel by the British author Ruthven Todd, written under the pen name of R.T. Campbell. It was the first in a series of novels featuring the botanist and amateur detective Professor John Stubbs. It has been republished in 1985 and 2019 by Dover Publications.

== Synopsis ==
After a murder takes place at an international gathering of geneticists, Professor Stubbs takes it upon himself to launch his own investigation. One of the scientists in particular is notorious for his plagiarism of the work of others.

== Bibliography ==
- Hanson, Gillian Mary. City and Shore: The Function of Setting in the British Mystery. McFarland, 2015.
- LaFollette, Marcel C. Stealing Into Print: Fraud, Plagiarism, and Misconduct in Scientific Publishing. University of California Press, 1996.
- Main, Peter. A Fervent Mind: The Life of Ruthven Todd. Lomax Press, 2018.
- Royle, Trevor. The Macmillan Companion to Scottish Literature. Macmillan, 1983.
