= Then and Now (novel) =

1946 historical novel by W. Somerset Maugham

Then and Now (1946 novel)
- First US edition
- Author: W. Somerset Maugham
- Language: English
- Publisher: Heinemann (UK); Doubleday (US)
- Publication date: 1946
- Publication place: United Kingdom
- Media type: Print (hardback & paperback)
- Preceded by: The Razor's Edge
- Followed by: Creatures of Circumstance

Then and Now is a historical novel by W. Somerset Maugham. Set mainly in Imola, Italy, but also in other Italian cities, including Machiavelli's hometown Florence during the Renaissance, the story focuses on three months in the life of Niccolò Machiavelli, the Florentine politician, diplomat, philosopher and writer in the early years of the 16th century. The book was first published by Heinemann in 1946. It recollects Machiavelli's encounter with Cesare Borgia, who was the model on which Machiavelli based his Il Principe. Against that background, a love farce unfolds, in which Machiavelli tries to seduce the young wife of his host at Imola. The unsuccessful affair gave Machiavelli the idea of writing his first comedy, The Mandrake. Thus, Then and Now appears to combine the two best-known works of Machiavelli – The Prince and The Mandrake.
