= Death for Madame =

1946 novel

- 2018 edition
- Author: Ruthven Todd
- Language: English
- Genre: Mystery
- Publisher: John Westhouse
- Publication date: 1946
- Publication place: United Kingdom
- Media type: Print
- Preceded by: Bodies in a Bookshop
- Followed by: The Death Cap

Death for Madame is a 1946 mystery detective novel by the British author Ruthven Todd, written under the pen name of R.T. Campbell. It was one of several novels featuring the botanist and amateur detective Professor John Stubbs. It takes the form of a closed circle of suspects investigation. It has been republished in 2018 by Dover Publications.

== Synopsis ==
After the aunt of an acquaintance of Stubbs is found strangled at the run-down boarding house she ran in Notting Hill, he takes it upon himself to launch an investigation to the continued irritation of Chief Inspector Bishop of Scotland Yard. The culprit appears to lie amongst her boarders, but all have alibis.

== Bibliography ==
- Hanson, Gillian Mary. City and Shore: The Function of Setting in the British Mystery. McFarland, 2015.
- Main, Peter. A Fervent Mind: The Life of Ruthven Todd. Lomax Press, 2018.
- Royle, Trevor. The Macmillan Companion to Scottish Literature. Macmillan, 1983.
