= Winifred May de Kok =

South Africa writer and doctor (1893–1969)

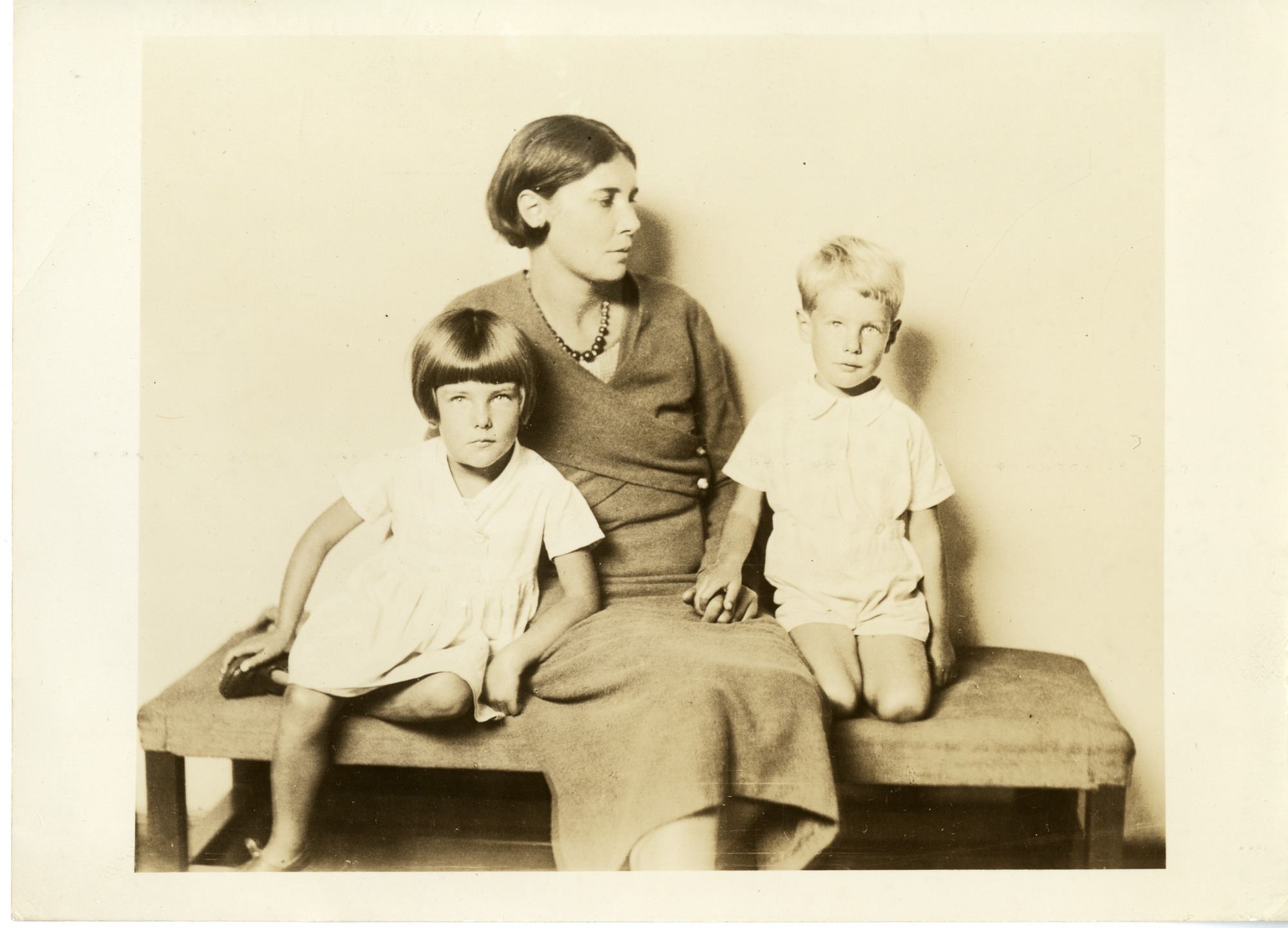
- Born: 17 May 1893; Bethlehem, Orange Free State, South Africa
- Died: 1969 (aged 75–76)
- Occupations: Physician, writer, broadcaster
- Known for: Childcare and family health advice
- Notable work: New Babes for Old (1932); First Baby (1947); You and Your Child (1955); Your Baby and You (1957)
- Spouse: Alfred Edgar Coppard (m. 1932)
- Children: 2

Winifred May de Kok, M.D. (17 May 1893 – 1969) was a South Africa-born writer and doctor. She was born in Bethlehem in the Orange Free State on 17 May 1893 and attended medical school in England during the 1920s.

== Personal life ==
She married the British short-story writer Alfred Edgar Coppard in 1932; they had two children.

== Career ==
=== Medical career ===
De Kok practiced medicine in England until 1953, focusing on women’s and infant health. She was recognized for her straightforward and practical advice on parenting and family life at a time when formal family planning organizations were limited.

=== Broadcasting career ===
After retiring from clinical practice, she became a broadcaster for the BBC television program Tell Me, Doctor, where she discussed topics related to pregnancy, child-rearing, and family health. This helped bring medical advice directly to the public.

=== Writing career ===
As a spokeswoman for women's and neonates' health before the era of family planning, she published several books and articles on parenting and family health.

== Selected works ==
- New Babes for Old (1932)
- First Baby (1947)
- You and Your Child (1955)
- Your Baby and You (1957)

== Death ==
Winifred died on 31 August 1969 at the age of 76.
