= Appleby on Ararat =

1941 novel

- American First Edition
- Author: Michael Innes
- Language: English
- Series: Sir John Appleby
- Genre: Mystery thriller
- Publisher: Gollancz; Dodd, Mead (US)
- Publication date: 1941
- Publication place: United Kingdom
- Media type: Print
- Preceded by: There Came Both Mist and Snow
- Followed by: The Daffodil Affair

Appleby on Ararat is a 1941 mystery thriller novel by the British writer Michael Innes. It is the seventh in his series featuring John Appleby, a Detective Inspector in the Metropolitan Police. Set during the Second World War the plot takes place on an island in the South Pacific. It was described by his biographer as "in every way Innes's most exotic production".

== Synopsis ==
A cruise liner is torpedoed while in the South Seas and half a dozen passengers float away on a sundeck café and are shipwrecked on what they take to be a deserted island. They soon prove to be mistaken as the island is crawling with other inhabitants, both native and foreign, including a group of archaeologists and a Nazi spy ring.

== Bibliography ==
- Hubin, Allen J. Crime Fiction, 1749-1980: A Comprehensive Bibliography. Garland Publishing, 1984.
- Reilly, John M. Twentieth Century Crime & Mystery Writers. Springer, 2015.
- Scheper, George L. Michael Innes. Ungar, 1986.
