= Fearful Pleasures =

1946 collection of fantasy and horror short stories by A. E. Coppard

- Dust-jacket illustration by Ronald Clyne for Fearful Pleasures by A. E. Coppard
- Author: A. E. Coppard
- Cover artist: Ronald Clyne
- Language: English
- Genre: fantasy, horror short stories
- Publisher: Arkham House
- Publication date: 1946
- Publication place: United States
- Media type: Print (hardback)
- Pages: xiii, 301 pp

Fearful Pleasures is a collection of fantasy and horror short stories by author A. E. Coppard. It was released in 1946 and was the first collection of the author's stories to be published by Arkham House. It was published in an edition of 4,033 copies.

== Contents ==
Fearful Pleasures contains the following tales:

1. "Foreword"
2. "Adam and Eve and Pinch Me"
3. "Clorinda Walks in Heaven"
4. "The Elixir of Youth"
5. "Simple Simon"
6. "Old Martin"
7. "The Bogie Man"
8. "Polly Morgan"
9. "The Gollan"
10. "The Post Office and the Serpent"
11. "Crotty"
12. "Shinkwin"
13. "Ahoy, Sailor Boy!"
14. "Gone Away"
15. "Rocky and the Bailiff"
16. "Ale Celestial"
17. "The Fair Young Willowy Tree"
18. "Father Raven"
19. "The Drum"
20. "Cheese"
21. "The Homeless One"
22. "The Kisstruck Bogie"
23. "The Tiger"
24. "The Gruesome Pit"

== Reception ==
The New York Times reviewer Helen B. Parker praised Coppard's "great propensity for capturing with lucidity the folk speech of the British Isles", concluding that the collection contained "more than enough poetry of language. His is the rare, musical style that almost demands reading aloud".
