= The Secret Vanguard =

1940 novel

- First edition (UK)
- Author: Michael Innes
- Language: English
- Series: Sir John Appleby
- Genre: Detective/Thriller
- Publisher: Gollancz; Dodd, Mead (US)
- Publication date: 1940
- Publication place: United Kingdom
- Media type: Print
- Preceded by: Stop Press
- Followed by: There Came Both Mist and Snow

The Secret Vanguard is a 1940 thriller novel by the British writer Michael Innes. It is the fifth in his series featuring John Appleby, a young Detective Inspector in the Metropolitan Police. The novel takes place in the early stages of the Second World War, and functions closer to a mystery spy novel than the traditional detective novel.

== Synopsis ==
Appleby's investigation of the murder of a poet seems to hinge on something the dead man overheard on a train journey shortly before. Meanwhile while crossing the Forth Bridge on another train, Sheila Grant hears a strange exchange between two men with a snatch of misquoted poetry. Later on she is kidnapped and held a prisoner in the countryside close to Troy Castle in the Scottish Highlands, apparently because it is now feared she knows too much. By this stage Appleby has worked out the two cases are connected and launches a major manhunt for her. She escapes and received help on the way from unexpected sources such as a Jacobite fiddler and a professor from the British Museum. Eventually with her the assistance of the authorities she is able to expose a ring of German spies trying to kidnap a very valuable scientist who is holidaying in the area.

== Bibliography ==
- Hubin, Allen J. Crime Fiction, 1749-1980: A Comprehensive Bibliography. Garland Publishing, 1984.
- Reilly, John M. Twentieth Century Crime & Mystery Writers. Springer, 2015.
- Scheper, George L. Michael Innes. Ungar, 1986.
