= Lament for a Maker =

1938 novel

- American first edition
- Author: Michael Innes
- Language: English
- Series: Sir John Appleby
- Genre: Detective
- Publisher: Gollancz; Dodd, Mead (US)
- Publication date: 1938
- Publication place: United Kingdom
- Media type: Print
- Preceded by: Hamlet, Revenge!
- Followed by: Stop Press

Lament for a Maker is a 1938 detective novel by the British writer Michael Innes. It is the third in his series featuring John Appleby, a young Detective Inspector in the Metropolitan Police. It was published during the Golden Age of Detective Fiction. The title refers to the Lament for the Makaris by the Scottish poet William Dunbar, which is constantly recited by one of the characters. The novel features a string of first person narratives of the events that takes place, with each character drawing a conclusion that builds on and also corrects the previous writer.

== Synopsis ==
In the Highlands of Scotland around the ancient but lonely Erchany Castle, strange happenings have occurred which alarm the local inhabitants culminating in the death by falling off the tower by the castle's miserly, reclusive owner. Suspicion for his murder seems to fall on a local man, whose family have a long-standing feud with the dead man, and who was about to elope with his daughter. The arrival of an Edinburgh lawyer and a Scotland Yard man both throw doubt on this easy solution, as the case seems to have its roots in events that took place in Australia forty years before involving the dead man's brother. Yet it proves so complex that even they take wrong turnings before the truth is eventually reached.

== Bibliography ==
- Hubin, Allen J. Crime Fiction, 1749–1980: A Comprehensive Bibliography. Garland Publishing, 1984.
- Reilly, John M. Twentieth Century Crime & Mystery Writers. Springer, 2015.
- Scheper, George L. Michael Innes. Ungar, 1986.
