= Operation Pax =

1951 novel

- Author: Michael Innes
- Language: English
- Series: Sir John Appleby
- Genre: Detective/Thriller
- Publisher: Gollancz; Dodd, Mead (US)
- Publication date: 1951
- Publication place: United Kingdom
- Media type: Print
- Preceded by: A Night of Errors
- Followed by: A Private View

Operation Pax is a 1951 mystery thriller novel by the British writer Michael Innes. It is the twelfth entry in his series featuring John Appleby, a detective in the Metropolitan Police. The novel is thematically a thriller rather than the traditional Golden Age of Detective Fiction murder investigation that features in most of the series. As with other books in the series a farcical tone is often maintained. It was released in the United States under the alternative title The Paper Thunderbolt.

== Synopsis ==
A small-time confidence trickster on the run stumbles across a sinister organisation, based at a manor house in the Cotswolds, who are using a high-class clinic as a front for their more dishonest activities. About to be killed by them, he manages to turn the tables, steal their formula and make an escape. Pursued by his ruthless adversaries, he manages to reach Oxford and stash the stolen formula in the Bodleian Library before he is recaptured. Coincidentally Appleby is also in the city, called in by his younger sister Jane to find her fiancé, an undergraduate who is gone missing. It turns out that he has vanished in the vicinity of the manor house, as has a refugee Austrian doctor and her young son.

Only when Jane penetrates the clinic does she discover the full extent of the scheme. What the confidence trickster had thought was an alchemist's operation to produce gold or at the very least forged five pound notes is in fact the development of a brainwashing technique that destroys any sense of human independence or resistance. The scheme is codenamed Operation Pax.

== Bibliography ==
- Hubin, Allen J. Crime Fiction, 1749-1980: A Comprehensive Bibliography. Garland Publishing, 1984.
- Reilly, John M. Twentieth Century Crime & Mystery Writers. Springer, 2015.
- Scheper, George L. Michael Innes. Ungar, 1986.
