= The Long Farewell (novel) =

1958 novel

- American first edition
- Author: Michael Innes
- Language: English
- Series: Sir John Appleby
- Genre: Detective/Thriller
- Publisher: Gollancz; Dodd, Mead (US)
- Publication date: 1958
- Publication place: United Kingdom
- Media type: Print
- Preceded by: Appleby Plays Chicken
- Followed by: Hare Sitting Up

The Long Farewell is a 1958 detective novel by the British writer Michael Innes. It is the fifteenth novel in his series featuring John Appleby, a senior detective with the Metropolitan Police. The title refers to a quote from Cardinal Wolsey in William Shakespeare's Henry VIII.

== Synopsis ==
While holidaying in Verona Appleby drops in on an old acquaintance, the Shakespearean scholar Lewis Packard. Over dinner he wonders whether Packard has some new discovery that will again astound the world of literary scholarship. However, a few months later Packard is dead. After attending his burial in London, Appleby travels out to his Dorset mansion. The official police view is that Packard committed suicide with a revolver after being confronted with his two much younger wives who he had married bigamously. Apparently overwhelmed by the situation he had shot himself. Appleby doubts this conclusion and his visit to the house reinforces this view.

== Bibliography ==
- Hubin, Allen J. Crime Fiction, 1749-1980: A Comprehensive Bibliography. Garland Publishing, 1984.
- Reilly, John M. Twentieth Century Crime & Mystery Writers. Springer, 2015.
- Scheper, George L. Michael Innes. Ungar, 1986.
