= The Weight of the Evidence =

1943 novel

- American First Edition
- Author: Michael Innes
- Language: English
- Series: Sir John Appleby
- Genre: Detective
- Publisher: Gollancz; Dodd, Mead (US)
- Publication date: 1943
- Publication place: United Kingdom
- Media type: Print
- Preceded by: The Daffodil Affair
- Followed by: Appleby's End

The Weight of the Evidence is a 1943 detective novel by the British writer Michael Innes. It is the ninth in his series featuring John Appleby, a young Detective Inspector in the Metropolitan Police. It was first published in America with the British release not taking place until the following year. It was published during the Golden Age of Detective Fiction. Although written during the Second World War, it is set in the pre-war era. Like a number of Golden Age mysteries including several by Innes it uses a university background, but in this case it switches from the usual Oxbridge setting to a newer Northern institution.

== Synopsis ==
One of the professors at Nesfield University is crushed to death by a falling meteorite. However it quickly becomes evident that it was thrown off the top of the university buildings, and Appleby is called in to work with the local police officer Hobhouse. He encounters a nest of jealousies among the various professors, and is offered a variety solutions which range from the plausible to the outlandish. He is intrigued by the stances of the Chancellor, the Duke of Nesfield whose country house the meteorite was stolen from, and the brilliant but self-regarding Welsh Vice Chancellor Sir David Evans. Among the professors he also discovers one of his own former lecturers from his university days.

== Bibliography ==
- Hubin, Allen J. Crime Fiction, 1749–1980: A Comprehensive Bibliography. Garland Publishing, 1984.
- Reilly, John M. Twentieth Century Crime & Mystery Writers. Springer, 2015.
- Scheper, George L. Michael Innes. Ungar, 1986.
