= Death at the President's Lodging =

1936 novel

- First Edition Cover
- Author: Michael Innes
- Language: English
- Series: Sir John Appleby
- Genre: Detective
- Publisher: Gollancz; Dodd, Mead (US)
- Publication date: 1936
- Publication place: United Kingdom
- Media type: Print
- Followed by: Hamlet, Revenge!

Death at the President's Lodging is a 1936 detective novel by the British writer Michael Innes. It was the first in a series of novels featuring John Appleby, a Detective Inspector in the Metropolitan Police. It is a traditional closed circle of suspects mystery, taking place in a fictitious Oxbridge college located in Bletchley about halfway between Cambridge and Oxford on the Varsity Line. It was released in the United States by Dodd, Mead under the alternative title Seven Suspects.

== Synopsis ==
Professor Umpleby, the president of St. Antony's College, is found shot dead in his study one night. Called in from London to handle the case, Appleby sets to work unravelling the mystery around it while staying at the college. It is clear due to a series of locked gates that only one of the fellows could have murdered their colleague. Despite the attempts of the Dean to suggest otherwise, it is clear that St. Antony's was seething with intellectual jealousy and dislike of the conniving Professor Umpleby.

In the course of his investigations Appleby is clouted round the head, swaps opinions with one of the suspects who is also a celebrated crime writer, and assisted by a group of three students who discover one of the masters, supposedly thousands of miles away, is in fact hiding in disguise near Burford. Ultimately Appleby is able to piece together the various, confusing strands to identify the murderer.

== Bibliography ==
- Hubin, Allen J. Crime Fiction, 1749-1980: A Comprehensive Bibliography. Garland Publishing, 1984.
- Reilly, John M. Twentieth Century Crime & Mystery Writers. Springer, 2015.
- Scheper, George L. Michael Innes. Ungar, 1986.
