= Hare Sitting Up =

1959 novel by Michael Innes

- Author: Michael Innes
- Language: English
- Series: Sir John Appleby
- Genre: Detective/Thriller
- Publisher: Gollancz; Dodd, Mead (US)
- Publication date: 1959
- Publication place: United Kingdom
- Media type: Print
- Preceded by: The Long Farewell
- Followed by: Silence Observed

Hare Sitting Up is a 1959 mystery thriller novel by the British writer Michael Innes. It is the sixteenth entry in his series featuring John Appleby, a detective with the Metropolitan Police. It is set against the backdrop of the Cold War. The title is taken from a quote from D.H. Lawrence's novel Women in Love. Reference is also made to the 1950 British film Seven Days to Noon.

== Synopsis ==
Professor Howard Juniper, a top British research scientist working on developing a response to biological warfare has vanished and, even more alarmingly may have taken a vial of some deadly disease. Juniper would be a top target for kidnapping from a foreign power, or equally may be suffering from a nervous breakdown. In order to buy time, Appleby persuades his identical twin brother Miles, a schoolmaster, to take his place for a few days.

Appleby's investigations take him to the neglected country estate of a bird-obsessed earl and a top secret rocket base on an island off the northern coast of Scotland. Things are further complicated when the second brother also disappears.

== Bibliography ==
- Carter, Ian. Ancient Cultures of Conceit: British University Fiction in the Post-War Years. Routledge, 2019.
- Hubin, Allen J. Crime Fiction, 1749-1980: A Comprehensive Bibliography. Garland Publishing, 1984.
- Reilly, John M. Twentieth Century Crime & Mystery Writers. Springer, 2015.
- Scheper, George L. Michael Innes. Ungar, 1986.
