= Silence Observed =

1961 novel

- American First Edition Cover
- Author: Michael Innes
- Language: English
- Series: Sir John Appleby
- Genre: Detective
- Publisher: Gollancz; Dodd, Mead (US)
- Publication date: 1961
- Publication place: United Kingdom
- Media type: Print
- Preceded by: Hare Sitting Up
- Followed by: A Connoisseur's Case

Silence Observed is a 1961 detective novel by the British writer Michael Innes. It is the seventeenth entry in his series featuring Sir John Appleby, now an Assistant Commissioner at Scotland Yard. It received a positive review from Anthony Lejeune in the Times Literary Supplement.

== Bibliography ==
- Hubin, Allen J. Crime Fiction, 1749-1980: A Comprehensive Bibliography. Garland Publishing, 1984.
- Reilly, John M. Twentieth Century Crime & Mystery Writers. Springer, 2015.
- Scheper, George L. Michael Innes. Ungar, 1986.
