= Appleby Talking =

1954 short story collection

- American First edition cover
- Author: Michael Innes
- Language: English
- Series: Sir John Appleby
- Genre: Detective
- Publisher: Gollancz; Dodd, Mead (US)
- Publication date: 1954
- Publication place: United Kingdom
- Media type: Print
- Preceded by: A Private View
- Followed by: Appleby Plays Chicken

Appleby Talking is a collection of detective short stories by the British writer Michael Innes published in 1954. John Appleby, a Golden Age Scotland Yard detective, features in all twenty three stories. The series of novels had run since Death at the President's Lodging in 1936, but this was the first time shorter stories about Appleby's cases had been collected in a single volume. It was followed by a second collection Appleby Talks Again in 1956. It was published in the United States under the alternative title Dead Man's Shoes.

== Stories ==
- Appleby's First Case
- Pokerwork
- The Spendlove Papers
- The Furies
- Eye Witness
- The Bandertree Case
- The Key
- The Flight of Patroclus
- The Clock-Face Case
- Miss Geach
- Tragedy of a Handkerchief
- The Cave of Belarius
- A Nice Cup of Tea
- The Sands of Thyme
- The X-Plan
- Lesson in Anatomy
- Imperious Caesar
- The Clancarron Ball
- A Dog's Life
- A Derby Horse
- William the Conqueror
- Dead Man's Shoes
- The Lion and the Unicorn

== Bibliography ==
- Hubin, Allen J. Crime Fiction, 1749-1980: A Comprehensive Bibliography. Garland Publishing, 1984.
- Reilly, John M. Twentieth Century Crime & Mystery Writers. Springer, 2015.
- Scheper, George L. Michael Innes. Ungar, 1986.
