= The Clock Strikes Twelve =

1946 collection of stories by author H. Russell Wakefield

- Dust-jacket illustration by Ronald Clyne for The Clock Strikes Twelve by H. R. Wakefield
- Author: H. Russell Wakefield
- Cover artist: Ronald Clyne
- Language: English
- Genre: Fantasy, horror
- Publisher: Arkham House
- Publication date: 1946
- Publication place: United States
- Media type: Print (hardback)
- Pages: xi, 248 pp

The Clock Strikes Twelve is a collection of stories by author H. Russell Wakefield, published by Arkham House in 1946, and was the first collection of the author's stories to be published by Arkham House. (An earlier edition, with four fewer stories, had been published in England in 1940.) It was published in an edition of 4,040 copies.

== Contents ==
The Clock Strikes Twelve contains a preface by Wakefield, "Why I Write Ghost Stories", and the following tales:

1. "Into Outer Darkness"
2. "The Alley"
3. "Jay Walkers"
4. "Ingredient X"
5. "“I Recognised the Voice”"
6. "Farewell Performance"
7. "Not Quite Cricket"
8. "In Collaboration"
9. "A Stitch in Time"
10. "Lucky's Grove"
11. "Red Feathers"
12. "Happy Ending?"
13. "The First Sheaf"
14. "Masrur"
15. "A Fishing Story"
16. "Used Car"
17. "Death of a Poacher"
18. "Knock! Knock! Who's There?"
