= Appleby Plays Chicken =

1957 novel

- American first edition
- Author: Michael Innes
- Language: English
- Series: Sir John Appleby
- Genre: Detective/Thriller
- Publisher: Gollancz; Dodd, Mead (US)
- Publication date: 1957
- Publication place: United Kingdom
- Media type: Print
- Preceded by: Appleby Talking
- Followed by: The Long Farewell

Appleby Plays Chicken is a 1957 detective novel by the British writer Michael Innes. It is the fourteenth novel in the long-running series by Innes featuring John Appleby, a senior detective with the Metropolitan Police. It blends the traditional Golden Age detective story with a mystery spy thriller plot. It was published in the United States under the alternative title Death on a Quiet Day.

Anthony Berkeley reviewing the novel in The Guardian observed "Michael Innes's appeal is to the intelligence, sometimes almost too much so; but in Appleby Plays Chicken he tells a straightforward story, based upon blackmail. Straightforward, that is, for this author; for there are the usual pleasant Innes quirks, such as an exhausted fugitive coming suddenly upon a point-to-point race and making his escape by mounting a riderless horses and joining in. As usual, too, the author enjoys himself vastly in the person of Sir John Appleby; and since Mr. Innes is not so dammed elusive this time the reader enjoys himself, too."

== Synopsis ==
A Oxbridge student holidaying in Devon with friends takes part one night in a game of chicken. The next day while out walking on Dartmoor he finds himself in more serious danger when he comes across a corpse on top of a tor. Pursued as an unfortunate witness, he is shot at and chased across the countryside. It is only when he reaches a cross-country horseracing event that he finds safety and, by coincidence, Appleby amongst the race officials.

Returning with him to the site of the crime, both men are perplexed when they find the original body gone but replaced by another. Even more strangely, Appleby recognises the new man. His former superior in wartime intelligence who he had previously suspected of dishonesty. The student begins to realise as well that Appleby has brought him there as a bait, hoping to lure the killers back to finish him off so he can arrest them.

== Bibliography ==
- Hubin, Allen J. Crime Fiction, 1749-1980: A Comprehensive Bibliography. Garland Publishing, 1984.
- Reilly, John M. Twentieth Century Crime & Mystery Writers. Springer, 2015.
- Scheper, George L. Michael Innes. Ungar, 1986.
