= The Man from the Sea (novel) =

1955 novel

- First edition (US)
- Author: Michael Innes
- Language: English
- Genre: Thriller
- Publisher: Gollancz; Dodd, Mead (US)
- Publication date: 1955
- Publication place: United Kingdom
- Media type: Print

The Man from the Sea is a 1955 thriller novel by the British writer Michael Innes. It was published in the United States by Dodd, Mead. It was a standalone novel from Innes who was best known for his series featuring Golden Age detective John Appleby. It was published in paperback by Avon under the alternative title Death by Moonlight.

== Synopsis ==
A man swims ashore from a cargo ship off the Scottish coast, interrupting a late night rendezvous between Richard Cranston and the wife of a local peer. His outlandish tale of Cold War espionage soon draws Cranston in and he assists him on a journey to London.

== Bibliography ==
- Reilly, John M. Twentieth Century Crime & Mystery Writers. Springer, 2015.
- Scheper, George L. Michael Innes. Ungar, 1986.
