= Bodies in a Bookshop =

1946 novel

- First edition
- Author: Ruthven Todd
- Language: English
- Series: Professor John Stubbs
- Genre: Mystery
- Publisher: John Westhouse
- Publication date: 1946
- Publication place: United Kingdom
- Media type: Print
- Pages: 178
- Preceded by: Take Thee a Sharp Knife
- Followed by: Death for Madame

Bodies in a Bookshop is a 1946 mystery detective novel by the British author Ruthven Todd, written under the pen name of R.T. Campbell. It was one of several novels featuring the botanist and amateur detective Professor John Stubbs.

== Synopsis ==
In a bookshop in a bohemian quarter just off the Tottenham Court Road a colleague of Stubbs encounters two dead men in a backroom. Investigating along with Chief Inspector Bishop of Scotland Yard, Stubbs uncovers a world of blackmail and pornographic books.

== Bibliography ==
- Hanson, Gillian Mary. City and Shore: The Function of Setting in the British Mystery. McFarland, 2015.
- Main, Peter. A Fervent Mind: The Life of Ruthven Todd. Lomax Press, 2018.
- Royle, Trevor. The Macmillan Companion to Scottish Literature. Macmillan, 1983.
