= Gil North =

Gil North (real name Geoffrey Horne; 12 July 1916 – 5 August 1988) was a British author of detective stories. His novels about Sergeant Cluff, based in Yorkshire, were made into a television series, Cluff, by the British Broadcasting Corporation (BBC) in the 1960s.

North was born in Skipton, Yorkshire, and educated at Ermysted's Grammar School and Christ's College, Cambridge. He married Betty Duthie in 1949. He died in Skipton in 1988.

From 1938 to 1955, North was a Civil Servant in the United Kingdom's African colonies.

== Bibliography ==
- Sergeant Cluff Stands Firm (1960)
- The Methods of Sergeant Cluff (1961)
- Sergeant Cluff Goes Fishing (1962)
- More Deaths for Sergeant Cluff (1963)
- Sergeant Cluff and the Madmen (1964)
- Sergeant Cluff and the Price of Pity (1965)
- The Confounding of Sergeant Cluff (1966)
- Sergeant Cluff and the Day of Reckoning (1967)
- The Procrastination of Sergeant Cluff (1969)
- No Choice for Sergeant Cluff (1971)
- Sergeant Cluff Rings True (1972)
- Corpse for Kofi Katt (1978)

The Conscience of Sergeant Cluff (1991) is a play by Leslie Sands.

"Sergeant Cluff Stands Firm" and "The Methods of Sergeant Cluff" have been republished in the British Library Classic Crime novels.
