= Chloe Marr =

1946 novel

- First edition (UK)
- Author: A.A. Milne
- Language: English
- Genre: Social Comedy
- Publisher: Methuen (UK); E. P. Dutton (US)
- Publication date: 1946
- Publication place: United Kingdom
- Media type: Print

Chloe Marr is a 1946 comedy novel by the British writer A.A. Milne. It was the last of a handful of novels written by Milne, better known for his plays and his short stories about Winnie the Pooh.

== Synopsis ==
During the Interwar period Chloe Marr, a celebrated Mayfair society beauty plays off her many suitors against each other but nurses a deep secret.

== Bibliography ==
- Brandreth, Gyles. Somewhere, a Boy and a Bear: A. A. Milne and the Creation of Winnie-the-Pooh. Michael Joseph (2025)
- Cohen, Nadia. The Extraordinary Life of A. A. Milne. Grub Street Publishers, 2017.
- Haring-Smith, Tori. A.A. Milne: A Critical Bibliography. Garland, 1982.
- Shaw, Bruce. Jolly Good Detecting: Humor in English Crime Fiction of the Golden Age. McFarland, 2013.
