= Swing Low, Swing Death =

1946 novel

- First edition
- Author: Ruthven Todd
- Language: English
- Genre: Mystery
- Publisher: John Westhouse
- Publication date: 1946
- Publication place: United Kingdom
- Media type: Print
- Preceded by: The Death Cap

Swing Low, Swing Death is a 1946 mystery detective novel by the British author Ruthven Todd, written under the pen name of R.T. Campbell. It was the last of seven novels featuring the botanist and amateur detective Professor John Stubbs. Todd planned to continue the series, with five more titles announced, but the bankruptcy of his publisher brought the series to a halt. The following year he emigrated to the United States. It was republished in 2018 by Dover Publications, along with three others Stubbs adventures.

== Synopsis ==
A controversial new modern art gallery in London is the site for the unveiling of a painting. However, when the supposed masterpiece is revealed, the body of a dead art dealer is found hanging from the picture hook.

== Bibliography ==
- Hanson, Gillian Mary. City and Shore: The Function of Setting in the British Mystery. McFarland, 2015.
- Main, Peter. A Fervent Mind: The Life of Ruthven Todd. Lomax Press, 2018.
- Royle, Trevor. The Macmillan Companion to Scottish Literature. Macmillan, 1983.
