= Cluff (TV series) =

British TV detective series (1964–1965)

- Created by: Gil North
- Starring: Leslie Sands; John Rolfe; John McKelvey; Olive Milbourne
- Country of origin: United Kingdom
- Original language: English
- No. of series: 2
- No. of episodes: 19 (7 missing)

Production
- Producers: Terence Dudley; Alan Sleath
- Running time: 50 minutes

Original release
- Network: BBC1
- Release: 3 August 1964 – 15 August 1965

Cluff is a detective television series set in the fictional town of Gunnershaw in the Yorkshire Dales. Based on the eponymous novels by Gil North, it featured Leslie Sands in the title role as Sergeant Caleb Cluff, and ran for two series between 1964-1965. The series was filmed around Skipton, North's hometown.

The entire first series including the pilot is missing from the BBC archives, but the second series has survived. The script for all episodes of this two-part series were written by North himself.

== Cast ==
- Leslie Sands as Detective Sergeant Caleb Cluff
- John Rolfe as Detective Constable Barker
- John McKelvey as PC Harry Bullock
- Olive Milbourne as Annie Croft
- Eric Barker as Inspector Mole (series one)
- Michael Bates as Inspector Mole (series two)
- Jack Howlett as Doctor Hamm
- Pauline Williams as Mrs Madge Mole
- Maggie Lambert as Mary Croft
- Clive as Cluff's dog

== Episodes ==
=== Series 1 ===
- 6 April 1964: The Drawing Detective (pilot) (missing)
- 3 August 1964: The Vagrant (missing)
- 10 August 1964: The Amorous Builder (missing)
- 17 August 1964: The Screeching Cat (missing)
- 24 August 1964: The Widow (missing)
- 31 August 1964: The Daughter-In-Law (missing)
- 7 September 1964: The Manufacturer's Wife (missing)

=== Series 2 ===
- 15 May 1965: The Chicken
- 22 May 1965: The Brothers
- 29 May 1965: The Cigarettes
- 5 June 1965: The Thief
- 12 June 1965: The Professional
- 19 June 1965: The Fireraiser
- 4 July 1965: The Strangers
- 11 July 1965: The Convict
- 18 July 1965: The Daughters
- 25 July 1965: The Husband
- 1 August 1965: The Pensioner
- 8 August 1965: The Dictator
- 15 August 1965: The Village Constable
