= The Death Cap =

1946 novel

- First edition
- Author: Ruthven Todd
- Language: English
- Genre: Mystery
- Publisher: John Westhouse
- Publication date: 1946
- Publication place: United Kingdom
- Media type: Print
- Preceded by: Death for Madame
- Followed by: Swing Low, Swing Death

The Death Cap is a 1946 mystery detective novel by the British author Ruthven Todd, written under the pen name of R.T. Campbell. It was one of several novels featuring the botanist and amateur detective Professor John Stubbs.

== Synopsis ==
After a young woman belonging to a Bohemian group of artists is poisoned by the death cap mushroom, the domineering and boorish Stubbs sets out to solve the case despite the objections of Chief Inspector Bishop of Scotland Yard.

== Bibliography ==
- Hanson, Gillian Mary. City and Shore: The Function of Setting in the British Mystery. McFarland, 2015.
- Main, Peter. A Fervent Mind: The Life of Ruthven Todd. Lomax Press, 2018.
- Royle, Trevor. The Macmillan Companion to Scottish Literature. Macmillan, 1983.
