= A. E. Coppard =

English writer

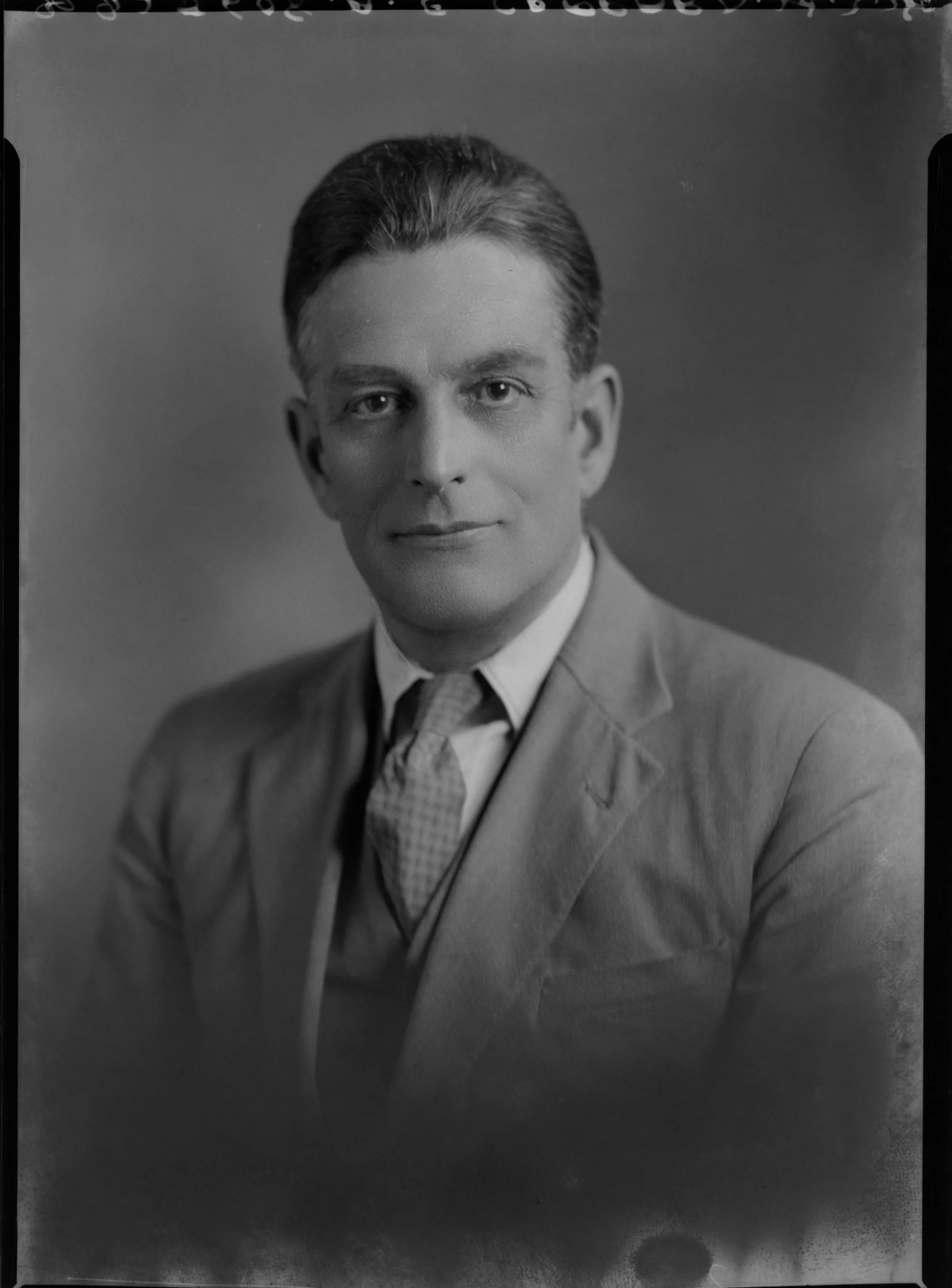
Coppard in 1928

Alfred Edgar Coppard (4 January 1878 – 13 January 1957) was an English author, noted for his short stories, many of which had rural settings. Largely self-taught, he was championed by Ford Madox Ford and Arnold Bennett, among others, in his lifetime, and more recently by Frank O’Connor, Doris Lessing and Russell Banks. Some of his stories were dramatised for British television in the 1960s and 1970s.

== Life ==
Coppard was born the son of a tailor and a housemaid in Folkestone and had little formal education. He grew up in difficult, poverty-stricken circumstances; he later described his childhood as "shockingly poor" and Frank O'Connor described Coppard's early life as 'cruel'. He quit school at the age of nine when his father died and was "taken off to London" to live with his uncle's family in "a street between Old Ford and Victoria Park". He first worked as an errand boy for a tailor, then as a Reuter's messenger. Returning to live with his mother in Brighton, he continued to work in menial jobs, as office boy and junior clerk for small businesses and manufacturing firms – but by the age of 15 he was also earning side money as a professional sprinter, and using that money to buy books. Having married Lily Ann Richardson in 1905, he left Brighton two years later for Oxford and further clerking jobs. In Oxford his various places of work included the Eagle Ironworks (a job that exempted him from military service). As an ‘irascible autodidact with nascent literary ambitions’, Coppard mixed with undergraduates and attended public lectures; in Oxford he also joined the Independent Labour Party and got to know budding literary figures including Aldous Huxley and Louis Golding. He was part of a literary group, the New Elizabethans, who met in a pub to read Elizabethan drama. W. B. Yeats sometimes attended the meetings. During this period he met Richard Hughes and Edgell Rickword, among others.

The first of his stories to be published was ‘Communion’ in The Varsity in 1916; by the end of 1918 he had published six more stories in magazines and the Manchester Guardian.

After the war, Coppard separated from his wife and went to live in ‘Shepherd's Pit’, a cottage outside Headington where he set about becoming a full-time writer. Around this time he befriended Robert Graves, who was living nearby in Islip. His first collection, Adam and Eve and Pinch Me, was published by the Golden Cockerel Press in 1921 and was a critical success; it was the first of over a dozen short-story collections he published in the 1920s and 1930s. He also published several volumes of poetry, beginning with Hips and Haws in 1922.

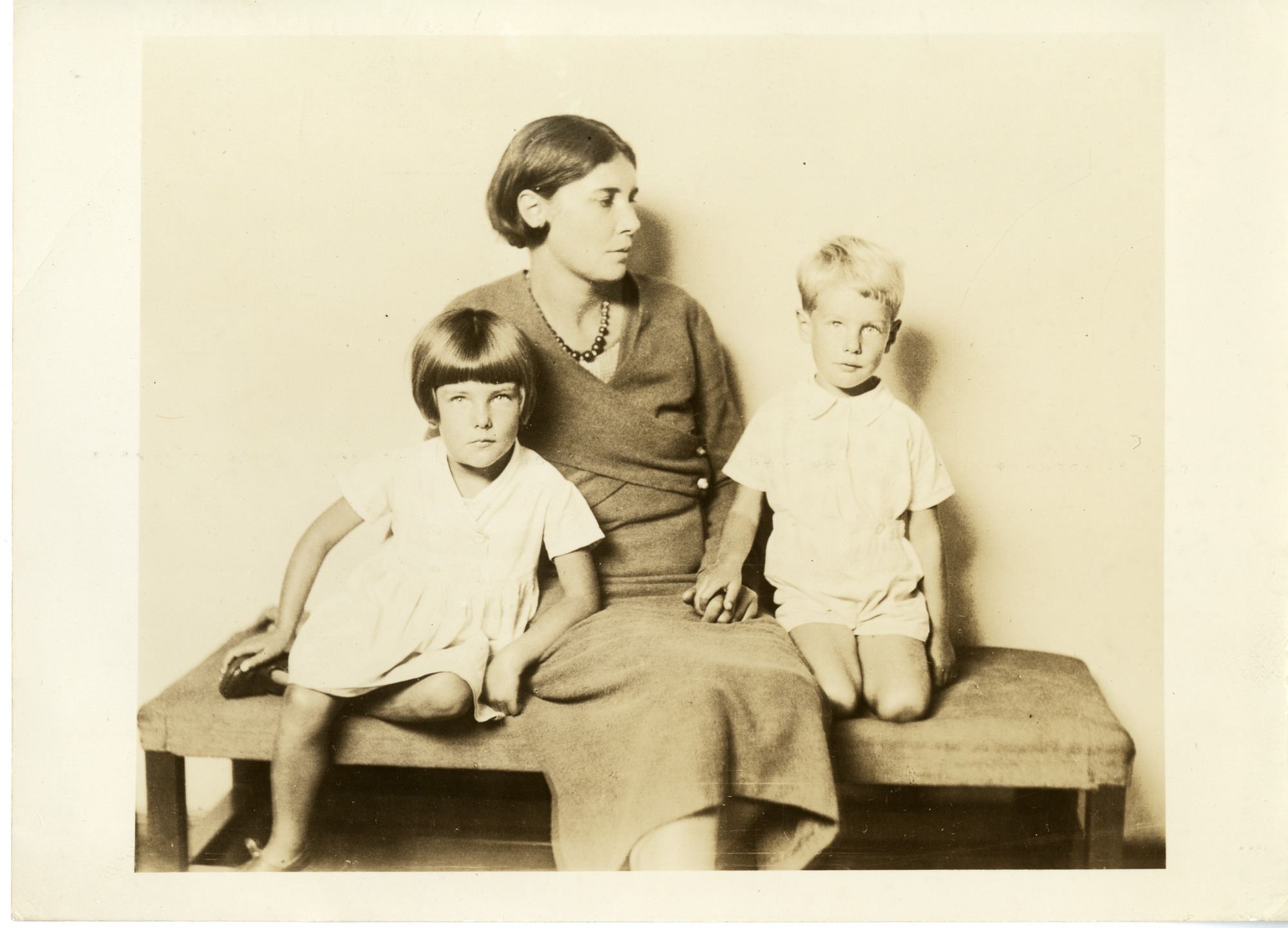
Coppard's second wife, Winifred de Kok, and two children

In 1932 after Lily Anne had died of cancer, Coppard married Winifred de Kok, with whom he had already had one daughter. Among Coppard's other love affairs was a relationship with Gay Taylor, wife of Harold Taylor, who founded the Golden Cockerel Press.

Coppard's fiction was influenced by Thomas Hardy and de Maupassant among others. His work enjoyed some popularity in the United States after his Collected Tales was chosen as a selection by the Book of the Month Club. In the introduction to this collection of 38 stories, Coppard stated that "it is my feeling that the closer the modern short story conforms to that ancient tradition of being spoken to you, rather than being read at you, the more acceptable it becomes".

In his mini-biography in Twentieth Century Authors, Coppard lists Abraham Lincoln as the politician he admired most. Coppard also listed Sterne, Dickens, James, Hardy, Shaw, Chekhov and Joyce as authors he valued; conversely, he expressed a dislike for the works of D. H. Lawrence, T. E. Lawrence, and Rudyard Kipling.

In Nancy Cunard's 1937 book Authors take Sides on the Spanish War, Coppard endorsed the Republicans.

Coppard's nephew was George Coppard, a British soldier who served with the UK Machine Gun Corps during World War I, known for his memoirs With A Machine Gun to Cambrai.

=== Critical reception ===
Coppard's short stories were praised by Ford Madox Ford and Frank O'Connor. His 1931 collection Nixey's Harlequin received good reviews from Leonard Strong, Gerald Bullett, and The Times Literary Supplement (which praised Coppard's "brilliant virtuosity as a pure spinner of tales"). Coppard's supernatural fiction was admired by Algernon Blackwood. Brian Stableford argues that Coppard's fantasy has a similar style to that of Walter de la Mare and that "many of his mercurial and oddly plaintive fantasies are deeply disturbing".

Since his death, several selections of Coppard's stories have been published: these include Dusky Ruth and Other Stories, with an introduction by Doris Lessing, and The Hurly Burly and Other Stories, edited by Russell Banks. In his introduction, Banks praises Coppard's treatment of women: "Like Maupassant, [he] was a careful, affectionate, compassionate observer of the lives of women, particularly poor, abandoned, or 'fallen' women." Reviewing Banks's selection in the London Review of Books, Blake Morrison noted that Coppard's tales "are chiefly concerned with ... romantic intrigue, disappointment and despair" but that his best work had rural settings: "[Coppard's] rare forays into an urban middle-class setting are unconvincing; unless his characters are speaking in rural dialect, with a keen attentiveness to the natural world, they sound off key."

=== Adaptations ===
Some of Coppard’s short stories have been adapted for British television. In December 1967 a BBC1 Omnibus programme directed by Jack Gold featured versions of ‘The Field of Mustard’, ‘Adam and Eve and Pinch Me’ and ‘Dusky Ruth’. The 1972 ITV series Country Matters adapted five more Coppard stories - ‘The Higgler’, ‘The Black Dog’, The Watercress Girl’, ‘The Sullens Sisters’ and ‘Craven Arms’ - and was shown as part of the Masterpiece Theatre series in the USA.

== Works ==
=== Story collections ===
- Adam & Eve & Pinch Me (1921)
- Clorinda Walks in Heaven (1922)
- The Black Dog and Other Stories (1923)
- Fishmonger's Fiddle: Tales (1925)
- The Field of Mustard (1926)
- Silver Circus (1928)
- Count Stefan (1928)
- The Higgler (1930)
- Nixey's Harlequin (1931)
- Fares Please! (1931)
- Crotty Shinkwin and The Beauty Spot (1932)
- Rummy, That Noble Game (1932)
- Dunky Fitlow (1933)
- Ring the Bells of Heaven (1933)
- Emergency Exit (1934)
- Pink Furniture (1930)
- Polly Oliver (1935)
- Ninepenny Flute (1937)
- You Never Know, Do You? (1939)
- Ugly Anna (1944)
- Fearful Pleasures (1946)
- Selected Tales (1946)
- The Dark Eyed Lady – Fourteen Tales (1947)
- Collected Tales (1948)
- Lucy in Her Pink Jacket (1954)
- Selected Stories (1972)
- The Collected Tales of A. E. Coppard (1976)
- The Higgler and Other Stories (1991)
- The Man from the Caravan and Other Stories (1999)
- Father Raven and Other Tales (2006)
- Weep not my wanton: selected short stories (2013)
- The Hurly Burly and Other Stories (2021)

=== Poetry collections ===
- Hips and Haws (1922)
- Yokohoma Garland & Other Poems (1926)
- Pelaga and Other Poems (1926)
- The Collected Poems of A. E. Coppard (1928)
- Cherry Ripe: Poems (1935)
- Simple Day: Selected Poems (1978)

=== Chapbooks ===
- The Hundredth Story of A. E. Coppard (1930)( Illustrated by Robert Gibbings)
- Cheefoo (1932)
- Good Samaritans (1934)
- These Hopes of Heaven (1934)
- Tapster's Tapestry :A Tale (1938) (Illustrated by Gwenda Morgan)

=== Non-Fiction ===
- Rummy: that noble game expounded in prose, poetry, diagram and engraving (1932) (Illustrated by Robert Gibbings).

=== As editor ===
- Songs from Robert Burns. Selected by A. E. Coppard, with wood engravings by Mabel Annesley (1925)

=== Contributor ===
- Consequences, a complete story in the manner of the old parlour game, in nine chapters, each by a different author (1932)

(Coppard was one of the contributors to this book; the others were Seán Ó Faoláin, Elizabeth Bowen, John Van Druten, Gladys Bronwyn Stern, Ronald Fraser, Malachi Whitaker, Norah Hoult and Hamish Maclaren.)

- The Fairies Return, or New Tales for Old (1934)

=== Autobiography ===
- It's Me, O Lord! (1957)
