= H. Russell Wakefield =

English short-story writer, novelist, publisher and civil servant

Herbert Russell Wakefield (1888 – 2 August 1964) was an English short-story writer, novelist, publisher, and civil servant chiefly remembered today for his ghost stories.

== Life ==
Wakefield was the third of four children of the clergyman Henry Russell Wakefield, who would become bishop of Birmingham in 1911. Born in Sandgate, Kent, he was educated at Marlborough College before attending University College, Oxford, where he took second-class honours in Modern History and played first-class cricket, golf, hockey and football. From 1912 to 1914 he was secretary to Lord Northcliffe; he then served with the Royal Scots Fusiliers in France and the Balkans during World War I, attaining the rank of captain. During the war, Wakefield called on the British government to use Chinese workers to assist the UK war effort.

Wakefield served as his father's secretary in 1920, when he accompanied the bishop on a lengthy tour of America. There he met and married Barbara Standish Waldo, an American woman whose parents were reputed to be wealthy. The Wakefields settled in London, where Wakefield went to work as a chief editor for the book publisher William Collins, Sons and Co., and she worked as a nurse. They were divorced in 1936, and in 1946 Wakefield was married again, to Jessica Sidney Davey. His experiences in the publishing world provided him with background material for several unusual and eerie tales, including "Messrs Turkes and Talbot".

Shortly before he died in Kensington, London, Wakefield's wife wrote to August Derleth that her husband had destroyed his correspondence files, manuscripts and all photographs of himself.

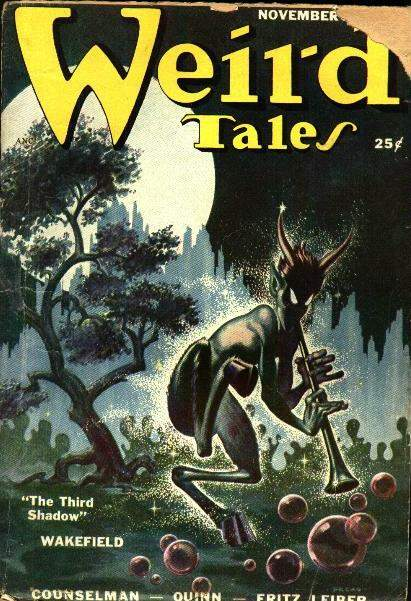
Wakefield's "The Third Shadow" was the cover story in the November 1950 Weird Tales.

== Work ==
Wakefield's ghost stories were published in several collections during the course of his long writing career: They Return at Evening (1928), Old Man's Beard: Fifteen Disturbing Tales (1929), Imagine a Man in a Box (1931), Ghost Stories (1932), A Ghostly Company (1935), The Clock Strikes Twelve: Tales of the Supernatural (1940), and Strayers from Sheol (1961). In 1946, August Derleth's Arkham House issued an expanded version of The Clock Strikes Twelve for the U.S. market; they were also the publishers of Strayers from Sheol. In 1978, John Murray published The Best Ghost Stories of H. Russell Wakefield, edited by Richard Dalby, which spanned Wakefield's career and featured some previously uncollected tales. A series of collections comprising his complete output of published ghost stories were produced in the 1990s by Ash-Tree Press in limited editions that quickly went out of print. Ash-Tree also published a volume of previously unpublished stories, Reunion at Dawn and Other Uncollected Ghost Stories, in 2000.

Wakefield's supernatural fiction was strongly influenced by the work of M. R. James and Algernon Blackwood. "The Red Lodge", "The Seventeenth Hole at Duncaster", "Blind Man's Buff", "'Look Up There!'" and "'He Cometh and He Passeth By!'" are among his most widely anthologised tales.

Wakefield is best known for his ghost stories, but he produced work outside the field. He was greatly interested in the criminal mind and wrote two non-fiction criminology studies, The Green Bicycle Case (1930) (about a 1919 death in Leicestershire) and Landru: The French Bluebeard (1936). He also wrote three detective novels: Hearken to the Evidence (1933), Belt of Suspicion (1936) and Hostess of Death (1938).

In 1968, BBC Television produced a dramatization of Wakefield's supernatural story "The Triumph of Death", starring Claire Bloom and now thought to have been wiped, for the series Late Night Horror.

== Critical reception ==
Many critics consider Wakefield one of the great masters of the supernatural horror tale; his atmospheric work in the field has been frequently compared to that of M. R. James. August Derleth called him "the last major representative of a ghost story tradition that began with Sheridan Le Fanu and reached its peak with Montague Rhodes James". John Betjeman noted, "M. R. James is the greatest master of the ghost story. Henry James, Sheridan Le Fanu and H. Russell Wakefield are equal seconds." M. R. James himself was slightly more reserved in his praise, calling They Return at Evening "a mixed bag, from which I should remove one or two that leave a nasty taste" but also saying the book had "some admirable pieces, very inventive". H. P. Lovecraft said that Wakefield "manages now and then to hit great heights of horror despite a vitiating air of sophistication". Franz Rottensteiner described Wakefield as "perhaps the last ... representative of the classic ghost story writer" and said that Wakefield's ghost stories have "a certain power". The horror historian R. S. Hadji included Wakefield's "The Frontier Guards" on his list of the most frightening horror stories. On the other hand, S. T. Joshi's view of Wakefield was negative: he has referred to Wakefield as "the mediocre H. Russell Wakefield".

Criticism of Wakefield's work is scattered and uncollected. The majority of it exists in reprints of his collections, in brief articles in reference books, and in surveys such as Jack Sullivan's Elegant Nightmares: The English Ghost Story from Le Fanu to Blackwood (1978). Appraisals can be found in Supernatural Fiction Writers (Scribners, 1985), the St. James Guide to Horror, Ghost and Gothic Writers (St. James Press, 1998), and Supernatural Literature of the World (Greenwood Press, 2005).

== Works ==
=== Short story collections ===
- They Return at Evening (1928): "That Dieth Not"; "Or Persons Unknown"; "'He Cometh and He Passeth By!'"; "Professor Pownall's Oversight"; "The Third Coach"; "The Red Lodge"; "'And He Shall Sing...'"; "The Seventeenth Hole at Duncaster"; "A Peg on Which to Hang"; "An Echo"
- Old Man's Beard (US title Others Who Returned, 1929): "A Coincidence at Hunton"; "A Case of Mistaken Identity"; "'Written in Our Flesh!"'; "'Look Up There!'"; "A Jolly Surprise for Henri"; "Nurse's Tale"; "Old Man's Beard"; "Present at the End"; "Surprise Item"; "The Cairn"; "The Dune"; "The Last to Leave"; "The Red Hand"; "Unrehearsed"; "Blind Man's Buff"
- Imagine a Man in a Box (1931): "The Frontier Guards"; "The Central Figure"; "Day-Dream in Macedon"; "Damp Sheets"; "The Inevitable Flaw"; "Epilogue by Roger Bantock"; "Corporal Humpit of the 4th Musketeers"; "Mr. Bellows, the Monkey and the Turtle"; "Imagine a Man in a Box"; "The 'Swimease'"; "The Sun in Their Eyes"; "The Only Way Out"; "The Lazaroid"
- Ghost Stories (1932): "Messrs. Turkes and Talbot"; "A Peg on Which to Hang"; "Used Car"; "Damp Sheets"; "The Cairn"; "Blind Man's Bluff [sic]"; "'Look Up There!'"; "The Frontier Guards"; "Mr. Ash's Studio"; "Nurse's Tale"; "A Coincidence at Hunton"; "The Red Hand"; "An Echo"; "Day-Dream in Macedon"; "Knock! Knock! Who's There?"; "Epilogue by Roger Bantock"; "The Last to Leave"; "The Central Figure"; "Old Man's Beard"; "Present at the End"; "A Jolly Surprise for Henri"
- A Ghostly Company (1935): "'And He Shall Sing ...'"; "Death of a Poacher"; "'He Cometh and He Passeth By!'"; "A Fishing Story"; "The Seventeenth Hole at Duncaster"; "Or Persons Unknown"; "The Inevitable Flaw"; "That Dieth Not"; "The Red Lodge"; "Professor Pownall's Oversight"; "The Third Coach"; "Colonel Humpit of the 4th Musketeers"
- The Clock Strikes Twelve: Tales of the Supernatural (1940): "Why I Write Ghost Stories"; "Into Outer Darkness"; "The Alley"; "Jay Walkers"; "Ingredient X"; "'I Recognised the Voice'"; "Farewell Performance"; "Not Quite Cricket"; "In Collaboration"; "A Stitch in Time"; "Lucky's Grove"; "Red Feathers"; "Happy Ending?"; "The First Sheaf"; "Masrur". The 1946 Arkkham House edition adds "A Fishing Story"; "Used Car"; "Death of a Poacher"; "Knock! Knock! Who's There?"
- Strayers from Sheol (1961): "Farewell to All Those!" (essay); "The Triumph of Death"; "Ghost Hunt"; "The Third Shadow"; "The Gorge of the Churels"; "Mr. Ash's Studio"; "Woe Water"; "A Kink in Space-Time"; "Messrs. Turkes and Talbot"; "'Immortal Bird'"; "The Caretaker"; "'Four Eyes'"; "The Sepulchre of Jasper Sarasen"; "The Middle Drawer"; "Monstrous Regiment"
- The Best Ghost Stories of H. Russell Wakefield (1978), edited by Richard Dalby: "The Red Lodge"; "'He Cometh and He Passeth By'"; "Professor Pownall's Oversight"; "The Seventeenth Hole at Duncaster"; "'Look Up There'"; "Blind Man's Buff"; "Day-Dream in Macedon"; "Damp Sheets"; "A Black Solitude"; "The Triumph of Death"; "A Kink in Space-Time"; "The Gorge of the Churels"; "'Immortal Bird'"; "Death of a Bumble-Bee"
- Reunion at Dawn and Other Uncollected Ghost Stories (2000): "Reunion at Dawn"; "The Fire-Watcher's Story"; "Parrot Cry"; "Surprise for Papa"; "Final Variation"; "The Sandwich"; "The Fall of the House of Gilpin"; "Vengeance Is Ours!"; "The Assignation"; "The Latch-Key"; "'The Night Can Sweat with Terror'"; "At World's End"; "An Air of Berlioz"; "The Bodyguard"; "'That Sleep of Death'"; "Familiar Spirit"; "A Man's Best Friend"

=== Novels ===
- Gallimaufry (1928)
- Happy Ever After (1929)
- Hearken to the Evidence (1934)
- Belt of Suspicion (1936)
- Hostess to Death (1938)

=== Non-fiction ===
- The Green Bicycle Case (1932)
- Landru, the French Bluebeard (1936)
