= Ryoki Inoue =

Brazilian writer (born 1946)

Ryoki Inoue (born José Carlos Ryoki de Alpoim Inoue, 22 July 1946) is a Brazilian writer purported to be the most prolific author. In 1996, he had published over 1,000 Portuguese-language books across 39 different pseudonyms. Before becoming a writer, Inoue was a medical doctor.

Inoue was born José Carlos Ryoki de Alpoim Inoue on 22 July 1946 in São Paulo to a Japanese father and Portuguese mother.

In 1993, Inoue was recognised with a Guinness World Record for publishing the most books. Inoue had published 15 more books by the time the certificate arrived in Brazil.

== Selected bibliography ==
- Oh, Those Texans
- Priest or Bandit?
- Saga (2006)

== Sources ==
=== Books and journals ===
- Iacobelli, Pedro; Lu, Sidney Xu (2023). The Japanese Empire and Latin America. University of Hawaii Press. p. 50. ISBN 9780824894627.
- Lewis, Michael (2002). Ken Wells (ed.). Floating off the page : the best stories from the Wall Street journal's "Middle column" (Wall Street journal book ed.). New York: Simon & Schuster. pp. 144–148. ISBN 978-0-7432-2664-6.
- López-Calvo, Ignacio (July 2019). Japanese Brazilian Saudades: Diasporic Identities and Cultural Production. University Press of Colorado. pp. 84–86. doi:10.5876/9781607328506.C002. ISBN 9781607328506.
- Pickering, Sam (2001). "Gardens of Books". The Sewanee Review. 109 (2). The Johns Hopkins University Press: 304–308. JSTOR 27549024.

=== Websites ===
- "Ryoki Inoue Biography". Ryoki Inoue.
