= Ruthven Todd =

Scottish poet, artist and novelist

- Born: 14 June 1914; Edinburgh, United Kingdom
- Died: 11 October 1978 (aged 64); Galilea, Spain
- Other name: R. T. Campbell
- Education: Fettes College, Edinburgh College of Art
- Occupations: writer, artist

Ruthven Campbell Todd (pronounced 'riven') (14 June 1914 – 11 October 1978) was a Scottish poet, artist and novelist, best known as an editor of the works of William Blake, and expert on his printing techniques. During the 1940s he also wrote detective fiction under the pseudonym R. T. Campbell and children's fiction during the 1950s.

== Biography ==
=== Edinburgh and the early years ===
Born in Edinburgh, Todd was the eldest of the ten children of Walker Todd (an architect) and Christian Todd (née Craik). He was educated at Dalhousie Preparatory School, Fettes College and Edinburgh College of Art. His short spell at art college convinced him that he had no creative talent as an artist and he thereafter pursued his ambition to become a poet and writer. At Fettes and at art college he had proved to be a rebellious teenager and he left college prematurely to be sent by his parents to work for two years as an agricultural labourer on the Isle of Mull. He then returned to Edinburgh to begin a career in copy-writing and journalism, while writing poetry and novels. He left Edinburgh for London in 1935.

=== London and Essex ===
He lived in a variety of types of accommodation in central London until the flat he was renting in Bloomsbury was hit by a flying bomb in 1944. He then moved to Tilty Mill House near Dunmow in Essex (later rented to poet and novelist Elizabeth Smart).

During the 1930s, he had become friendly with Dylan Thomas, Louis MacNeice, Geoffrey Grigson, Norman Cameron, David Gascoyne and Len Lye. He became a life-long friend of Julian Symons, and a character based on Todd was included in Symons' first detective story, The Immaterial Murder Case. He also knew Wyndham Lewis, contributing to the Lewis issue of Julian Symons's Twentieth Century Verse. Lewis recruited Todd to keep awake the dozing Ezra Pound, whose portrait Lewis was painting. He was secretary to the 1936 International Surrealist Exhibition, during which he was memorably required to rescue Salvador Dalí from suffocating inside a heavy diving suit. In 1937 he worked for a period for Mass-Observation where he developed lasting friendships with Humphrey Jennings and Kathleen Raine. During this period, and throughout his life, Todd struggled to keep afloat financially and had to supplement a meagre and uncertain income from writing poetry and novels by writing reviews, tutoring and copy-writing.

Todd's two allegorical novels Over the Mountain (1939) and The Lost Traveller (1943) both feature protagonists on symbolic journeys; Todd acknowledged the influence of Lewis and Rex Warner on the latter novel. Over the Mountain, a satire on fascism, has its hero travel to a dystopian nation with an oppressive government. During World War II he was a conscientious objector. Near the start of the war, he began work on an ambitious project in collaboration with the William Blake expert Sir Geoffrey Keynes to compile a catalogue raisonné of the artworks of William Blake. The project was to be abandoned in 1947, after Todd moved to New York, but not before a great deal had been achieved.

=== United States ===
Todd moved to the United States in 1947, where he lived for the next twelve years, becoming a US citizen in 1959. He resided initially in New York where he became friendly with the writers Alastair Reid and Howard Schoenfeld. He worked in the summer of 1947 at Stanley William Hayter's Atelier 17 printing workshop, where he collaborated with Joan Miró and other artists in experiments relating to William Blake's printing methods. He founded and ran the Weekend Press during the early 1950s, and received friendship and some financial support from W. H. Auden. He was one of the main participants in the events surrounding Dylan Thomas's death in 1953. In 1954 he moved to live on the island of Martha's Vineyard where he began to write children's fiction, with the launch of the Space Cat series. In 1959 he was commissioned by the Trustees of the Dylan Thomas Estate to write the official biography of Thomas. However, he was forced to abandon the work three years later and the job passed to Constantine Fitzgibbon.

=== Mallorca ===
In 1960, Todd moved to Mallorca, briefly living in the village of Deià, where he became a friend of Robert Graves, before settling at El Terreno in Palma de Mallorca. He moved in 1965 to the mountain village of Galilea where he spent the remainder of his life. During the 1970s he visited the US on a number of occasions to give lecture courses on Creative Writing and William Blake at the Universities of Buffalo and Maryland. He died in Galilea from emphysema in 1978.

The first biography of Ruthven Todd was published in 2018, and a bibliography of his works was published in 2020.

== Personal life ==
In 1937, Todd married Cicely Crew, daughter of the geneticist Professor Francis Crew. They had one son, Christopher, born in 1939. The couple separated in 1943 and were divorced three years later. While living in New York in 1949, Todd was briefly and unsuccessfully married to Paula Norworth, before a third marriage to the artist and sculptor Joellen Hall in 1952. They divorced in 1956.

Todd had a lifelong interest in the natural world, particularly in plants and fungi, and was a knowledgeable amateur mycologist. He was also a highly skilled illustrator of wild flowers and fungi. He made some money from selling his drawings, but most were given away to friends.

From his teenage years and throughout his life, Todd was a chronic alcoholic. He underwent treatment for addiction in 1965, but this was only partially successful. He was also a chain-smoker and suffered from frequent bouts of pulmonary disease.

== Bibliography ==
=== Novels ===
- Over the Mountain (Harrap, 1939)
- The Lost Traveller (Grey Walls Press, 1943)
- Loser's Choice (Hermitage House, 1953)

=== Poetry ===
- Ten Poems (privately printed, 1940)
- Poems for Penny (privately printed, 1942)
- Until Now (1942) Fortune Press
- The Acreage of the Heart (William Maclellan, 1944)
- The Planet in my Hand (privately printed, 1944)
- The Planet in my Hand (Grey Walls Press, 1946) (different selection from 1944 version)
- Two Poems: Christmas 1951 (Weekend Press, 1951)
- In Other Worlds (The Piper's Press, 1951)
- Poem: 1954 (privately printed, 1954)
- A Mantelpiece of Shells (Bonacio and Saul, 1954)
- Monotropa Uniflora (privately printed, 1955)
- Funeral of a Child (privately printed, 1962)
- Garland for the Winter Solstice (Dent, 1961)
- The Geography of Faces (privately printed, 1965)
- John Berryman 1914–1972 (Poem of the Month Club, 1972)
- Lament of the Cats of Rapallo (privately printed, 1973)
- A Short Happy Poem for Marianne Moore (University of Buffalo, 1973)
- A Godson Born in the 70s (privately printed, 1973)

=== Detective fiction written under the pen-name of "R.T. Campbell" ===
- Unholy Dying (John Westhouse, 1945)
- Take thee a Sharp Knife (John Westhouse, 1946)
- Adventure with a Goat (John Westhouse, 1946)
- Apollo Wore a Wig (John Westhouse, 1946)
- Bodies in a Bookshop (John Westhouse, 1946)
- Death for Madame (John Westhouse, 1946)
- The Death Cap (John Westhouse, 1946)
- Swing Low, Swing Death (John Westhouse, 1946)

=== Children's books ===
- First Animal Book (Peter Lunn, 1946) juvenile verses accompanying Thomas Bewick engravings
- Space Cat (Scribner's, 1952)
- Trucks, Tractors, and Trailers (Putnam, 1954)
- Space Cat Visits Venus (Scribner's, 1955)
- Space Cat Meets Mars (Scribner's, 1957)
- Space Cat and the Kittens (Scribner's, 1958)
- Tan's Fish (Little, Brown and Co., 1958)

=== Works as editor and contributor ===
- Proems (Fortune Press, 1938) as contributor
- Poets of Tomorrow (Hogarth Press, 1939) as contributor
- The Life of William Blake by Alexander Gilchrist (Dent, 1942) as editor
- Blake: Songs of Innocence and of Experience (United Book Guild, 1947) as editor
- William Blake: America, a prophecy (United Book Guild, 1947) as editor
- A Century of British Painters (Phaidon Press, 1947) as editor, original authors Richard Redgrave and Samuel Redgrave
- Christopher Smart: A Song to David and other poems (Grey Walls Press, 1947) as editor
- William Blake: Poems (Grey Walls Press, 1949) as editor
- Blake: Selected Poetry (Dell, 1960) as editor
- Poetry of the Thirties (Penguin Books, 1964) as contributor

=== Biographies, essays and miscellaneous ===
- The Laughing Mulatto (Rich and Cowan, [1940]) biography of Alexandre Dumas
- Tracks in the Snow (Grey Walls Press, 1946) essays on William Blake, Henry Fuseli and John Martin
- William Blake: Songs of Innocence and of Experience (privately printed, 1941) folio of prints
- The Tropical Fish Book (Fawcett, 1953)
- Blake's Dante Plates (Book Collecting and Library Monthly, 1968)
- William Blake: The Artist (Studio Vista, 1971)
- The Ghost of Dylan Thomas (Happenstance Press, 2014) posthumously published memoir
