= The Daffodil Affair =

1942 novel

- American First Edition
- Author: Michael Innes
- Language: English
- Series: Sir John Appleby
- Genre: Mystery thriller
- Publisher: Gollancz; Dodd, Mead (US)
- Publication date: 1942
- Publication place: United Kingdom
- Media type: Print
- Preceded by: Appleby on Ararat
- Followed by: The Weight of the Evidence

The Daffodil Affair is a 1942 mystery novel and thriller novel by the British writer Michael Innes. It is the eighth in his series featuring John Appleby, a young Detective Inspector in the Metropolitan Police. It takes place during the early years of the Second World War. Like many entries in the series it contains elements of farcical and surrealist humour, and does not follow the standard pattern of the Golden Age detective novel. Like the previous entry in the series, Appleby on Ararat, it is noted for its exotic setting. In the Times Literary Supplement, reviewer Maurice Willson Disher described it as "an incoherent sandwich: alternate slabs of instruction and entertainment".

== Synopsis ==
Appleby is called north to Harrogate on an unusual case. A cab horse named Daffodil has been stolen from his stables. Daffodil seems an otherwise valueless animal except for an ability to discern numbers like a human. At the same time in London, equally intriguing reports arrive of a reputedly haunted eighteenth-century townhouse disappearing from Bloomsbury. At first taken to be the work of German bombers during the Blitz, it has in fact been carefully dismantled and shipped away. To add to the mystery, two young women believed to have unusual powers have also been abducted by a gang.

Before long Appleby is on a cargo ship heading for South America with his colleague Hudspith, who believes they are on the trail of white slavers. Assuming cover identities, they manage to fall in with the leader of the organisation, who invites them to accompany him to his headquarters. This turns out to be located on a series of islands high up the Amazon River. He reveals himself as a man who is trying to conduct a vast series of experiments in the supernatural to try to corner the market in witchcraft and other unnatural phenomena. With the potential destruction of the globe in the ongoing world war, he foresees even more success for his project. He has lured away or stolen a variety of people and objects he believes will help him complete this mission.

Before long it becomes clear to Appleby that the man has seen right through their cover story. He is in fact keeping them there to kill one of them in the Bloomsbury mansion – rebuilt in the tropics – to see whether the other can sense or see it telepathically. In this, Appleby sees a chance for them to turn the tables on their host and escape.

== Bibliography ==
- Hubin, Allen J. Crime Fiction, 1749–1980: A Comprehensive Bibliography. Garland Publishing, 1984.
- Reilly, John M. Twentieth Century Crime & Mystery Writers. Springer, 2015.
- Scheper, George L. Michael Innes. Ungar, 1986.
