= Hamlet, Revenge! =

1937 novel

- First Edition
- Author: Michael Innes
- Language: English
- Series: Sir John Appleby
- Genre: Detective, Theatre-fiction
- Publisher: Gollancz; Dodd, Mead (US)
- Publication date: 1937
- Publication place: United Kingdom
- Media type: Print
- Preceded by: Death at the President's Lodging
- Followed by: Lament for a Maker

Hamlet, Revenge! is a 1937 detective novel by Michael Innes (the pen name of J.I.M. Stewart), his second novel. It centres on the investigation into the murder of the Lord Chancellor of England during an amateur production of Shakespeare's Hamlet, in which he plays Polonius, and other crimes which follow at the seat of the Duke of Horton, Scamnum Court.

== Synopsis ==
Inspector John Appleby is called by the Government to investigate the fatal shooting of Lord Auldearn, theologian and Lord Chancellor of England during a private production of Hamlet at Scamnum Court.

== Themes ==
Quotes from Shakespeare set an ominous tone for the novel and are used as death threats to the Lord Chancellor and to open each part. Also the book repeatedly mentions the gothic features of the estate.

== Structure ==
The book is split into four parts; Prologue, Development, Denouement and Epilogue.

== Prologue ==
The guests begin to arrive at the Scamnum Court as their hosts make the final preparations. However here is perhaps a slight apprehension from some of those involved, which soon seems to be warranted when one of the actors is killed by an unknown assassin.

== Reception ==
The Times Literary Supplement said: "Michael Innes is in a class by himself among writers of detective fiction". In 1990 it was placed at number 68 by the Crime Writers' Association in its Top 100 Crime Novels of All Time.

== See also ==
- 1930s
- 1937 in literature
- Crime fiction
- Golden Age of Detective Fiction

== Bibliography ==
- The Hatchards Crime Companion. 100 Top Crime Novels Selected by the Crime Writers' Association, ed. Susan Moody (London, 1990) (ISBN 0-904030-02-4).
