= J. I. M. Stewart =

British author, critic and academic (1906–1994)

J. I. M. Stewart HonFRSE
- J. I. M. Stewart in 1973, by Fay Godwin.
- Born: John Innes Mackintosh Stewart; 30 September 1906; Edinburgh
- Died: 12 November 1994 (aged 88); Coulsdon, London
- Education: Oriel College, Oxford
- Occupation: Professor of English
- Spouse: Margaret Hardwick (m. 1932; died 1979)
- Children: 5, including Angus John Mackintosh Stewart
- Writing career
- Pen name: Michael Innes
- Language: English
- Period: 1936–1987
- Genres: Mysteries, Literary criticism

John Innes Mackintosh Stewart (30 September 1906 – 12 November 1994) was a Scottish novelist and academic. He is equally well known for the works of literary criticism and contemporary novels published under his real name and for the crime fiction published under the pseudonym of Michael Innes. He is known for his Sir John Appleby series, which started with Death at the President's Lodging (1936).

== Life ==
Stewart was born in Edinburgh, the son of Elizabeth (Eliza) Jane (née Clark) and John Stewart of Nairn. His father was a lawyer and later the Director of Education for the City of Edinburgh.

Stewart was educated at Edinburgh Academy from 1913 to 1924 and then studied English literature at Oriel College, Oxford, graduating BA in 1928. At Oxford he was presented with the Matthew Arnold Memorial Prize and was named a Bishop Frazer's scholar. Using this, in 1929 he went to Vienna to study psychoanalysis. He was lecturer in English at the University of Leeds from 1930 to 1935 and then became Jury Professor of English in the University of Adelaide, South Australia.

In 1932 he married Margaret Hardwick (1905—1979).

He returned to the United Kingdom to become Lecturer in English at the Queen's University of Belfast from 1946 to 1948. In 1949 he became a Student (equivalent of Fellow in other Oxford colleges) of Christ Church, Oxford. By the time of his retirement in 1973, he was a professor of the university.

In 1990 he was elected an Honorary Fellow of the Royal Society of Edinburgh.

He died at Coulsdon in south London on 12 November 1994, aged 88. His estate was valued at £139,330.

=== Michael Innes ===
Between 1936 and 1986, Stewart, writing under the pseudonym of Michael Innes, published nearly fifty crime novels and short story collections, which he later described as "entertainments". These abound in literary allusions and in what critics have variously described as "mischievous wit", "exuberant fancy" and a "tongue-in-cheek propensity" for intriguing turns of phrase. Julian Symons identified Innes as one of the "farceurs"—crime writers for whom the detective story was "an over-civilized joke with a frivolity which makes it a literary conversation piece with detection taking place on the side"—and described Innes's writing as being "rather in the manner of Peacock strained through or distorted by Aldous Huxley". His mysteries have also been described as combining "the elliptical introspection ... [of] a Jamesian character's speech, the intellectual precision of a Conradian description, and the amazing coincidences that mark any one of Hardy's plots".

The best-known of Innes's detective creations is Sir John Appleby, who is introduced in Death at the President's Lodging, in which he is a Detective Inspector at Scotland Yard. Appleby features in many of the later novels and short stories, in the course of which he rises to become Commissioner of the Metropolitan Police (and subsequently, following his retirement, continues to investigate crimes as an amateur). Other novels feature portrait painter and Royal Academician, Charles Honeybath, an amateur but nonetheless effective sleuth. The two detectives meet in Appleby and Honeybath. Some of the later stories feature Appleby's son Bobby as sleuth.

In 2007, his family transferred all the Innes copyrights and other legal rights to Owatonna Media. Owatonna Media on-sold these copyrights to Coolabi Plc in 2009, but retained a master licence in radio and audio rights. Literary rights are currently held by John Stewart Literary Management, and published by House of Stratus.

== Publications ==
Stewart wrote several critical studies, including full-length studies of James Joyce, Joseph Conrad, Thomas Love Peacock and Thomas Hardy, as well as many novels and short stories. His last publication was his autobiography Myself and Michael Innes (1987).

=== As J. I. M. Stewart ===
Non-fiction

- Educating the Emotions (1944)
- Character and Motive in Shakespeare (1949)
- James Joyce (1957)
- Eight Modern Writers (1963)
- Thomas Love Peacock (1963)
- Rudyard Kipling (1966)
- Joseph Conrad (1968)
- Shakespeare's Lofty Scene (1971)
- Thomas Hardy: A Critical Biography (1971)

Fiction

- Mark Lambert's Supper (1954)
- The Guardians (1955)
- A Use of Riches (1957)
- The Man Who Won the Pools (1961)
- The Last Tresilians (1963)
- An Acre of Grass (1965)
- The Aylwins (1966)
- Vanderlyn's Kingdom (1967)
- Avery's Mission (1971)
- A Palace of Art (1972)
- Mungo's Dream (1973)
- A Staircase in Surrey quintet:
  - The Gaudy (1974)
  - Young Pattullo (1975)
  - Memorial Service (1976)
  - The Madonna of the Astrolabe (1977)
  - Full Term (1978)
- Andrew and Tobias (1980)
- A Villa in France (1982)
- An Open Prison (1984)
- The Naylors (1985)

Short story collections

- The Man Who Wrote Detective Stories (1959)
- Cucumber Sandwiches (1969)
- Our England Is a Garden (1979)
- The Bridge at Arta (1981)
- My Aunt Christina (1983)
- Parlour Four (1984)

Memoir

- Myself and Michael Innes: A Memoir (1987)

Edited texts

- William Makepeace Thackeray's Vanity Fair (Penguin English Library, 1968)

=== As Michael Innes ===
==== John Appleby series ====
===== Novels =====
- Death at the President's Lodging (1936) (also known as Seven Suspects)
- Hamlet, Revenge! (1937)
- Lament for a Maker (1938)
- Stop Press (1939) (also known as The Spider Strikes)
- The Secret Vanguard (1940)
- There Came Both Mist and Snow (1940) (also known as A Comedy of Terrors)
- Appleby on Ararat (1941)
- The Daffodil Affair (1942)
- The Weight of the Evidence (1943)
- Appleby's End (1945)
- A Night of Errors (1947)
- Operation Pax (1951) (also known as The Paper Thunderbolt)
- A Private View (1952) (also known as One-Man Show and Murder Is an Art)
- Appleby Plays Chicken (1957) (also known as Death on a Quiet Day)
- The Long Farewell (1958)
- Hare Sitting Up (1959)
- Silence Observed (1961)
- A Connoisseur's Case (1962) (also known as The Crabtree Affair)
- Appleby Intervenes (omnibus volume, 1965, containing One-Man Show, A Comedy of Terrors, The Secret Vanguard)
- The Bloody Wood (1966)
- Appleby at Allington (1968) (also known as Death by Water)
- A Family Affair (1969) (also known as Picture of Guilt)
- Death at the Chase (1970)
- An Awkward Lie (1971), ISBN 0-396-06345-4
- The Open House (1972), ISBN 0-396-06524-4
- Appleby's Answer (1973), ISBN 0-396-06744-1
- Appleby's Other Story (1974), ISBN 0-396-06715-8
- The Gay Phoenix (1976), ISBN 0-396-07442-1
- The Ampersand Papers (1978), ISBN 0-396-07663-7
- Sheiks and Adders (1982), ISBN 0-396-08063-4
- Appleby and Honeybath (1983), ISBN 0-396-08247-5
- Carson's Conspiracy (1984), ISBN 0-396-08395-1
- Appleby and the Ospreys (1986), ISBN 0-396-08950-X

===== Short story collections =====
- Appleby Talking (1954) (also known as Dead Man's Shoes): 'Appleby's First Case; Pokerwork'; 'The Spendlove Papers'; 'The Furies'; 'Eye Witness'; 'The Bandertree Case'; 'The Key'; 'The Flight of Patroclus'; 'The Clock-Face Case'; 'Miss Geach'; 'Tragedy of a Handkerchief; 'The Cave of Belarius'; 'A Nice Cup of Tea'; 'The Sands of Thyme'; 'The X-Plan'; 'Lesson in Anatomy'; 'Imperious Caesar'; 'The Clancarron Ball'; 'A Dog's Life'; 'A Derby Horse'; 'William the Conqueror'; 'Dead Man's Shoes'; 'The Lion and the Unicorn'.
- Appleby Talks Again (1956): 'A Matter of Goblins'; 'Was He Morton?'; 'Dangerfield's Diary'; 'Grey's Ghost'; 'False Colours'; 'The Ribbon'; 'The Exile'; 'Enigma Jones'; 'The Heritage Portrait'; 'Murder on the 7.16'; 'A Very Odd Case'; 'The Four Seasons'; 'Here is the News'; 'The Reprisal'; 'Bear's Box'; 'Tom, Dick and Harry'; 'The Lombard Books'; 'The Mouse-Trap'.
- The Appleby File (1975), ISBN 0-396-07279-8: 'The Appleby File': 'The Ascham. Poltergeist'; 'The Fishermen'; 'The Conversation Piece'; 'Death by Water'; 'A Question of Confidence'; 'The Memorial Service'. 'Appleby's Holidays': 'Two on a Tower'; 'Beggar with Skull'; 'The Exploding Battleship'; 'The Body in the Glen'; 'Death in the Sun'; 'Cold Blood'; 'The Coy Mistress'; 'The Thirteenth Priest Hole'.
- Appleby Talks About Crime (Crippen & Landru, 2010), ISBN 978-1-932009-91-0: 'A Small Peter Pry'; 'The Author Changes His Style'; 'The Perfect Murder'; 'The Scattergood Emeralds'; 'The Impressionist'; 'The Secret in the Woodpile'; 'The General's Wife is Blackmailed'; 'Who Suspects the Postman?'; 'A Change of Face'; 'The Theft of the Downing Street Letter'; 'The Tinted Diamonds'; 'Jerry Does a Good Turn for the Djam'; 'The Left-Handed Barber'; 'The Party that Never Got Going'; 'The Mystery of Paul's "Posthumous" Portrait'; 'The Inspector Feels the Draught' 'Pelly and Cullis'; 'The Man Who Collected Satchels'.

==== Short stories ====
- "William the Conqueror". Liverpool Echo, 19 February 1953. Collected in Appleby Talking.
- "The X-Plan". Liverpool Echo, 24 July 1954. Collected in Appleby Talking.
- "Here Is the News". Aberdeen Evening Express, 13 November 1954. Collected in Appleby Talks Again.
- "[TITLE UNKNOWN]". The Sketch, December 1954.
- "Tom, Dick and Harry". Dundee Evening Telegraph, 6 October 1955. Collected in Appleby Talks Again.
- "The Four Seasons". The Sketch, 1 December 1955.
- "Appleby's Fables, No. 1: Jeremy Does a Good Turn for the Djam". Aberdeen Evening Express, 15 April 1958. Collected in Appleby Talks About Crime.
- "Appleby's Fables, No. 2: The Mystery of Paul's 'Posthumous Portrait'". Aberdeen Evening Express, 16 April 1958. Collected in Appleby Talks About Crime.
- "Appleby's Fables, No. 3: No. 1 Suspect Is the Postman". Aberdeen Evening Express, 17 April 1958. Collected in Appleby Talks About Crime as "Who Suspects the Postman?".
- "Appleby's Fables, No. 4: The Inspector Feels a Draught". Aberdeen Evening Express, 18 April 1958. Collected in Appleby Talks About Crime.
- "Appleby's Fables, No. 5: Dobson the High-Brow Changes His Style". Aberdeen Evening Express, 19 April 1958. Collected in Appleby Talks About Crime as "A Change of Face".

==== Other ====
- What Happened at Hazelwood (1946)
- From London Far (1946) (also known as The Unsuspected Chasm)
- The Journeying Boy (1949) (also known as The Case of the Journeying Boy)
- Christmas at Candleshoe (1953) (also known as Candleshoe)
- The Man from the Sea (1955) (also known as Death by Moonlight)
- Old Hall, New Hall (1956) (also known as A Question of Queens)
- The New Sonia Wayward (1960) (also known as The Case of Sonia Wayward)
- Money from Holme (1964)
- A Change of Heir (1966)
- The Mysterious Commission (1974), ISBN 0-396-07134-1
- Honeybath's Haven (1977), ISBN 0-396-07555-X
- Going It Alone (1980), ISBN 0-396-07819-2
- Lord Mullion's Secret (1981), ISBN 0-396-08005-7

Christmas at Candleshoe was the basis for the 1977 film Candleshoe starring Jodie Foster, Helen Hayes and David Niven.
