= George Coppard =

British Army soldier

George Coppard, MM
- Born: George Alfred Coppard; 26 January 1898; Brighton, England
- Died: 17 February 1985 (aged 87); Bexhill, England
- Military career
- Allegiance: United Kingdom
- Branch: British Army
- Service years: 1914–1919
- Rank: Corporal
- Unit: Machine Gun Corps
- Conflicts: Loos, Somme, Arras, Cambrai
- Awards: Military Medal
- Other work: Civil Servant

Corporal George Alfred Coppard MM (26 January 1898 – 17 February 1985) was a British soldier who served with the Machine Gun Corps during World War I. Following his retirement he published his memoirs entitled With A Machine Gun to Cambrai in 1969.

== Early years ==
George Coppard was born on 26 January 1898 and left school to work for a taxidermy firm at the age of 13.

== World War I ==
Following the outbreak of War in 1914, towards the end of August he attempted to enlist at Mitcham Road Barracks in Croydon. After telling a recruiting sergeant his real age he was told to clear off and "come back tomorrow and see if you're nineteen". He returned the next day and lied about his age, stating that he was nineteen, and was enlisted. It was 27 August 1914 and he was sixteen years and seven months old. He joined the 6th Battalion Royal West Surrey Regiment (now part of The Queen's Regiment).

Having completed training in Guildford, the Battalion was posted to France in 1915, where they soon found themselves involved in the battle of Loos. At this stage Coppard had become a member of one of the machine gun teams. He fought in the front line almost continuously through the campaigns of 1916 and 1917 with the exception of a period of convalescence after he was accidentally shot by a colleague on 17 October 1916. This included most of the battle of the Somme (1916) and the battle of Arras (1917).

He was wounded again on 22 November 1917 during the Battle of Cambrai, nearly killed by a machine gun bullet which passed through his left thigh and severed his femoral artery. His life was saved by his colleagues, who quickly applied a tourniquet. By this time Coppard had been promoted to Corporal and awarded the Military Medal for gallantry before Cambrai. On the day that he was wounded his promotion to sergeant was to have been recorded in company orders, but this did not happen due to his wound. He was invalided to England, to Birkenhead Borough Hospital, where he remained until June 1918. He was discharged to the Machine Gun Corps convalescent camp at Harrowby in Yorkshire, where he was still recovering when the Armistice was signed.

== Later years ==
With the armistice having brought an end to hostilities, Coppard was discharged in 1919. Following a period of unemployment, he sought employment as an assistant steward at a golf club and thereafter in various sundry appointments. He retired in 1962, having worked at the Ministry of National Insurance since 1946.

He was married and had two daughters.

During retirement Coppard sought and received encouragement from the Imperial War Museum to have his wartime diaries published. Published in 1969, With a Machine Gun to Cambrai proved an instant success, prompting his contemporaries to publish their own wartime accounts.
