= Sir John Appleby =

John Appleby
- First appearance: Death at the President's Lodging
- Last appearance: Appleby and the Ospreys
- Created by: Michael Innes

In-universe information
- Gender: Male
- Title: Detective inspector, Commissioner of police
- Occupation: Police officer
- Spouse: Judith Raven
- Relatives: Patricia (sister); Jane (sister); Bobby (son)
- Nationality: British

Sir John Appleby is a fictional detective created by Michael Innes in the 1930s who appeared in many novels and short stories.

== Character overview ==
Appleby had perhaps the longest career of any of the great detectives. In Silence Observed he states that his age is fifty-three, which, if the action of the book takes place in the year of publication, would mean that he was born in 1907 or 1908. This is contradicted in The Gay Phoenix where he says that he was 29 when he married. He becomes engaged in Appleby's End, published 1945, which would mean that he was born in 1916.

Appleby's background remains enigmatic although certain clues emerge in several novels. He was born in Kirkby Overblow (as mentioned in Hare Sitting Up) and brought up in a back street in a Midlands town (Appleby's Other Story). His grandfather had been a baker and he himself had won a scholarship to university (There Came Both Mist and Snow).

He first appeared as a youthful Detective Inspector from Scotland Yard in Death at the President's Lodging (Seven Suspects in the United States) in 1936. He retired from Scotland Yard at a very early age just after World War II, on marrying Judith Raven, a sculptor first encountered in Appleby's End. He had two younger sisters, Patricia (Stop Press) and Jane (Operation Pax), both of whom figure prominently in one novel each and then are never mentioned again.

He then reappeared as Commissioner of the Metropolitan Police, a position rewarded by a knighthood. Although he later retired to Long Dream Manor, his wife's family home in the countryside, he continued to solve crimes well into the 1980s, his last appearance being in Appleby and the Ospreys in 1986, 50 years after his fictional debut. For a couple of the later tales his son Bobby serves as the chief protagonist.

In 2010, eighteen previously uncollected short stories appeared in Appleby Talks About Crime.

Appleby is mentioned in the Edmund Crispin novel Holy Disorders and the Isaac Asimov Union Club short story "The Three Goblets."

== Appleby stories ==
=== Novels ===
- Death at the President's Lodging (1936) (also known as Seven Suspects)
- Hamlet, Revenge! (1937)
- Lament for a Maker (1938)
- Stop Press (1939) (also known as The Spider Strikes)
- The Secret Vanguard (1940)
- There Came Both Mist and Snow (1940) (also known as A Comedy of Terrors)
- Appleby on Ararat (1941)
- The Daffodil Affair (1942)
- The Weight of the Evidence (1943)
- Appleby's End (1945)
- A Night of Errors (1947)
- Operation Pax (1951) (also known as The Paper Thunderbolt)
- A Private View (1952) (also known as One-Man Show and Murder Is an Art)
- Appleby Plays Chicken (1957) (also known as Death on a Quiet Day)
- The Long Farewell (1958)
- Hare Sitting Up (1959)
- Silence Observed (1961)
- A Connoisseur's Case (1962) (also known as The Crabtree Affair)
- The Bloody Wood (1966)
- Appleby at Allington (1968) (also known as Death by Water)
- A Family Affair (1969) (also known as Picture of Guilt)
- Death at the Chase (1970)
- An Awkward Lie (1971), ISBN 0-396-06345-4
- The Open House (1972), ISBN 0-396-06524-4
- Appleby's Answer (1973), ISBN 0-396-06744-1
- Appleby's Other Story (1974), ISBN 0-396-06715-8
- The Gay Phoenix (1976), ISBN 0-396-07442-1
- The Ampersand Papers (1978), ISBN 0-396-07663-7
- Sheiks and Adders (1982), ISBN 0-396-08063-4
- Appleby and Honeybath (1983), ISBN 0-396-08247-5
- Carson's Conspiracy (1984), ISBN 0-396-08395-1
- Appleby and the Ospreys (1986), ISBN 0-396-08950-X

=== Short story collections ===
- Appleby Talking (1954) (also known as Dead Man's Shoes)
- Appleby Talks Again (1956)
- Appleby Intervenes (1965)
- The Appleby File (1975), ISBN 0-396-07279-8
- Appleby Talks About Crime (2010), ISBN 978-1-932009-91-0

== Adaptations ==
=== Television ===
A Connoisseur's Case and Lesson in Anatomy were adapted for the 1960s BBC anthology series Detective, with Appleby being played by Dennis Price and Ian Ogilvy, respectively.

=== Radio ===
Two of the Appleby stories were adapted for BBC Radio's Saturday Night Theatre: Appleby's End in 1982, with John Hurt, and Lament for a Maker in 1988, with Michael MacKenzie.
