= Closed circle of suspects =

Subgenre of detective fiction

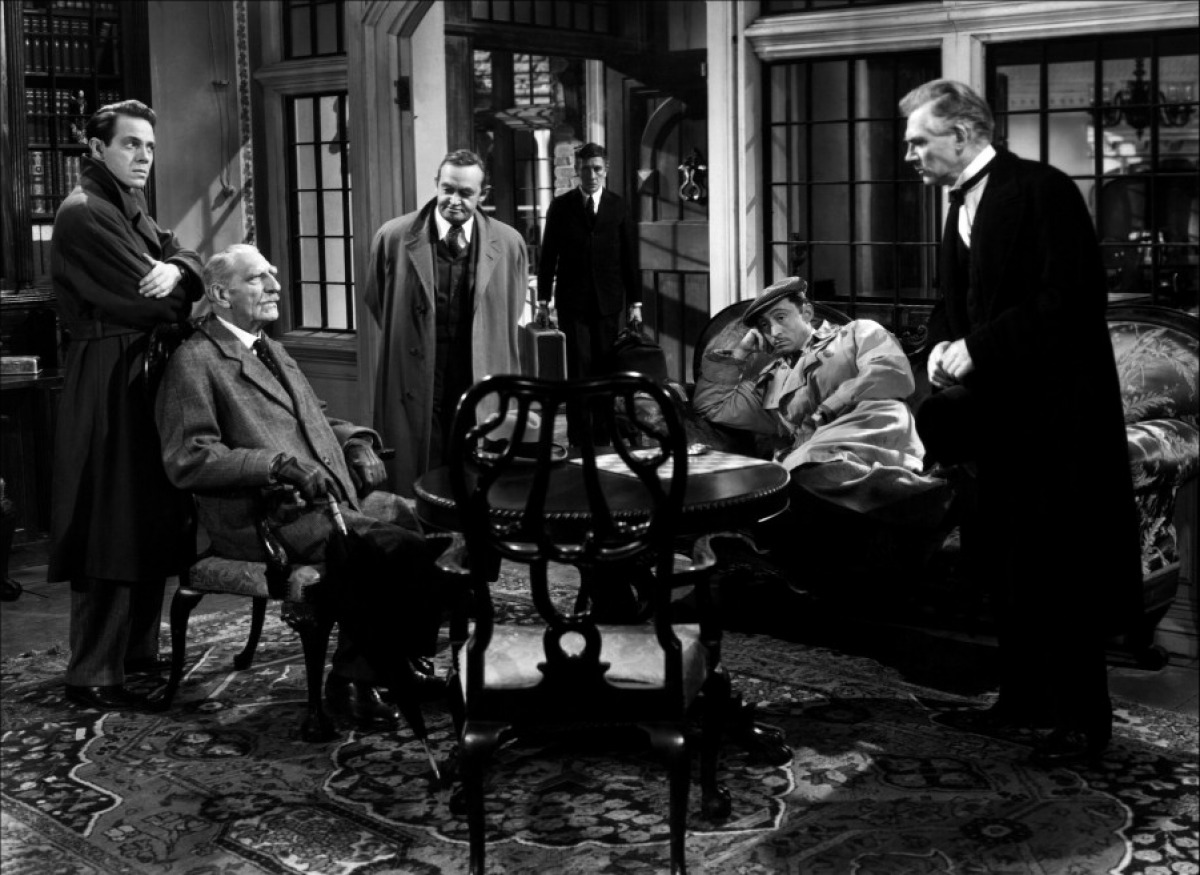
In Agatha Christie's And Then There Were None, a murder occurs among a group of strangers in a house on an isolated island.

The closed circle of suspects is a conceit of detective fiction, wherein a given crime (usually a murder) occurs within a limited and predefined group of characters, all of whom are isolated in a confined setting such as a remote estate, island, or train, ensuring the perpetrator must be one among them. This narrows the investigative focus to a limited number of suspects, each with credible means, motive, and opportunity. The detective has to solve the crime, figuring out the criminal from this pool of suspects, rather than searching for an entirely unknown perpetrator. The subgenre that employs this can be referred to as the closed circle mystery. Less precisely, this subgenre – works with the closed circle literary device – is simply known as the "classic", "traditional" or "cozy" detective fiction.

== History ==
This type of narrative originated in British detective fiction. Agatha Christie's The Mysterious Affair at Styles (1920) has been credited as a work that started this trend. Other writers of that period, dating to the first half of the 20th century, a time known as the Golden Age of Detective Fiction (or more general, mystery fiction), reliant on the closed circle and related literary devices include Agatha Christie, Dorothy L. Sayers, Margery Allingham and Ngaio Marsh (the Queens of Crime), G. K. Chesterton and Americans S. S. Van Dine and Ellery Queen.

Those early closed circle mysteries preferred a common setting: a British country house. The country house was a common enough element that closed circle mysteries set in such a location are sometimes known as "country house mysteries". The persons involved were also commonly part of the upper class, generally the landed gentry. Other settings than the country house are possible, such as ships, trains, islands, and so on. The requirements for the setup of the mystery enforce certain limitations on the genre. Certain settings are frequently represented in the genre, typically involving upper-class characters to whose properties outsiders have limited access. The numbers of suspects vary, from a group as small as four or five, to all the passengers of a train, coach or wagon. The location may be temporarily isolated by a snowstorm or similar, and may or may not have a working telephone, but generally has a working power supply as well as servants to cook and clean (who are not generally suspects)

After the Second World War, the closed circle mystery became less common as other types of crime novels rose to prominence; nonetheless, writers such as Rex Stout, Lucille Kallen, Cyril Hare, Jonathan Gash, and Simon Brett have employed the device in their fiction.

While the closed circle is a common device in literary fiction, it is a much less common occurrence in actual criminal investigations.

== Country house mystery ==
Examples of the "Country house mystery" from the Golden Age of Detective Fiction are:

- And Then There Were None by Agatha Christie (set on an island)
- Death and the Dancing Footman by Ngaio Marsh (in which the characters are isolated by a snowstorm; the classic Country House setting!)

More recent examples include:

- "And Then There Were Fewer" (an episode from Family Guy that takes place in a manor house owned by James Woods on a remote island)
- Knives Out by Rian Johnson (a film set primarily in a country manor house)
- 7 Women and a Murder by Alessandro Genovesi (a film which takes place in a manor house during a snowstorm)
- Hitman 3 (video game featuring a level, inspired by Knives Out, in which the player can solve a murder in a country manor on Dartmoor)

== Other fiction featuring closed circles ==
- Murder on the Orient Express by Agatha Christie (set on a stalled train in a snowdrift)
- Death on the Nile by Agatha Christie (set on a Nile river steamer)
- Vintage Murder by Ngaio Marsh (set in a country house)
- The Five Red Herrings by Dorothy L. Sayers (in which the suspects are a small number of talented artists)
- Glass Onion by Rian Johnson (film set on an island)
- The Last of Sheila by Stephen Sondheim and Anthony Perkins (film set on a yacht)
- Murder on the Leviathan by Boris Akunin (set on the eponymous ship)
- Death in the Clouds by Agatha Christie (set on an airplane)
- Evil Under The Sun by Agatha Christie (set on an island hotel)
- Wildfire at Midnight by Mary Stewart (set at a remote country hotel in Skye)

== See also ==
- Cluedo, a board game with a closed circle of suspects as its premise
- Danganronpa, a visual novel video game franchise that takes the form of a collection of closed-circle murder-mysteries
- Locked-room mystery
