= 1937 in literature =

This article contains information about the literary events and publications of 1937.

== Events ==
Playbill for the original 1937 production of The Lost Colony (click for full PDF)

- January 9 – The first issue of Look magazine goes on sale in the United States.
- January 19 – BBC Television broadcasts The Underground Murder Mystery by J. Bissell Thomas from London, the first play to be written for television.
- February 6 – John Steinbeck's novella of the Great Depression, Of Mice and Men, appears in the United States.
- April – The Irish writers Elizabeth Bowen and Seán Ó Faoláin first meet, in London.
- May 14 – BBC Television broadcasts a 30-minute excerpt of Twelfth Night, the first known television broadcast of a Shakespeare piece. The cast includes Peggy Ashcroft and Greer Garson.
- May 21 – Penguin Books in the U.K. launches Pelican Books, a sixpenny paperback non-fiction imprint, with a two-volume edition of George Bernard Shaw's The Intelligent Woman's Guide to Socialism and Capitalism.
- June
  - The British science fiction magazine Tales of Wonder first appears.
  - John Cowper Powys visits Sycharth, birthplace of Owain Glyndŵr, which inspires his 1940 novel Owen Glendower.
- June 30 – The New England Quarterly prints poems by a colonial American pastor, Edward Taylor (died 1729), discovered by Thomas H. Johnson.
- Summer – American-born writer Thomas Quinn Curtiss meets German-born novelist Klaus Mann in Europe and they start a relationship.
- July
  - Buchenwald concentration camp in Nazi Germany is established around the Goethe Oak.
  - Rex Ingamells and other poets initiate the Jindyworobak Movement in Australian literature, in the magazine Venture.
  - The American academic librarian Randolph Greenfield Adams writes a controversial Library Quarterly essay, "Librarians as Enemies of Books", complaining of librarians downgrading books and scholarship in favor of other tasks.
- July 4 – The Lost Colony, a historical drama by Paul Green, is first performed at an outdoor theater in the place where it is set: Roanoke Island, North Carolina.
- July 31 – Stephen Vincent Benét's post-apocalyptic short story By the Waters of Babylon, inspired by April's Bombing of Guernica, is published in the U.S. The Saturday Evening Post as "The Place of the Gods".
- September 10 – The Soviet playwright Sergei Tretyakov commits suicide while under sentence of death at Butyrka prison in Moscow as part of the Great Purge.
- September 21 – J. R. R. Tolkien's juvenile fantasy novel The Hobbit, or There and Back Again is published in England by George Allen & Unwin on the recommendation of young Rayner Unwin.
- September 29 – The French playwright Antonin Artaud is expelled from Ireland.
- October 6 – The fictional Mrs. Miniver appears in a column on domestic life by Jan Struther for The Times, London.
- November 11 (Armistice Day)
  - BBC Television broadcasts Journey's End by R. C. Sherriff, 1928, set on the Western Front (World War I) in 1918, as the first full-length television adaptation of a stage play. Reginald Tate plays the lead, having long performed it in the theatre.
  - Caesar, Orson Welles's modern-dress bare-stage adaptation of Shakespeare's Julius Caesar, premieres as the first production of the Mercury Theatre in New York City.
- December 21 – Dr. Seuss's first book, And to Think That I Saw It on Mulberry Street, is published by Vanguard Press.
- unknown dates
  - The National Library of Iran is inaugurated in Tehran.
  - The future novelist Angus Wilson becomes a book cataloguer at the British Museum Library in London.

== New books ==
=== Fiction ===
- Felix Aderca – Orașele înecate (Sunken Cities)
- Shakib al-Jabiri – al-Naham (Greed)
- Eric Ambler – Uncommon Danger
- Bibhutibhushan Bandyopadhyay – Chander Pahar (চাঁদের পাহড়, Mountain of the Moon)
- Vicki Baum – Love and Death in Bali (Liebe und Tod auf Bali)
- Anthony Berkeley – Trial and Error
- Georges Bernanos – Mouchette
- Ion Biberi – Oameni în ceață (People in the Fog)
- Karen Blixen – Out of Africa (published in US as by Isak Dinesen; published in Denmark as Den afrikanske farm)
- Phyllis Bottome – The Mortal Storm
- John Bude – The Cheltenham Square Murder
- Morley Callaghan – More Joy in Heaven
- John Dickson Carr (as Carter Dickson) – The Ten Teacups
- Agatha Christie – Hercule Poirot stories
  - Death on the Nile
  - Dumb Witness
  - Murder in the Mews
- Stuart Cloete – Turning Wheels
- J. J. Connington – A Minor Operation
- Murray Constantine – Swastika Night
- Freeman Wills Crofts – Found Floating
- A. J. Cronin – The Citadel
- James Curtis – There Ain't No Justice
- Ludovic Dauș – O jumătate de om (Half a Man)
- Cecil Day-Lewis – There's Trouble Brewing
- Pierre Drieu La Rochelle – Rêveuse bourgeoisie
- Lawrence Durrell (as Charles Norden) – Panic Spring
- Hans Fallada – Wolf Among Wolves (Wolf unter Wölfen)
- Max Frisch – An Answer from the Silence (Antwort aus der Stille)
- Zona Gale – Light Woman
- Anthony Gilbert
  - The Man Who Wasn't There
  - Murder Has No Tongue
- Witold Gombrowicz – Ferdydurke
- Cyril Hare – Tenant for Death
- Sadegh Hedayat – The Blind Owl (بوف کور, Boof-e koor)
- Ernest Hemingway – To Have and Have Not
- Robert Hichens – Daniel Airlie
- Katharine Hull and Pamela Whitlock – The Far-Distant Oxus
- Zora Neale Hurston – Their Eyes Were Watching God
- Michael Innes – Hamlet, Revenge!
- Margaret Irwin – The Stranger Prince
- Franz Kafka (posthumously translated by Willa and Edwin Muir) – The Trial (first English translation of Der Process)
- Irmgard Keun – After Midnight (Nach Mitternacht)
- Ronald Knox – Double Cross Purposes
- Kalki Krishnamurthy – Kalvaninn Kaadhali
- Halldór Laxness – Ljós heimsins (The Light of the World) – Part I, Heimsljós (World Light)
- Alexander Lernet-Holenia
  - Der Mann im Hut
  - Mona Lisa
- Meyer Levin – The Old Bunch
- E. C. R. Lorac
  - Bats in the Belfry
  - These Names Make Clues
- Ngaio Marsh – Vintage Murder
- A. E. W. Mason – The Drum
- Cameron McCabe – The Face on the Cutting-Room Floor
- Compton Mackenzie – The East Wind of Love (first in The Four Winds of Love series of six books)
- W. Somerset Maugham – Theatre
- Oscar Millard – Uncensored
- Gladys Mitchell – Come Away, Death
- R. K. Narayan – The Bachelor of Arts
- Elliot Paul – Life and Death of a Spanish Town
- Robert Prechtl – Titanic
- Ellery Queen – The Door Between
- Rafael Sabatini – The Lost King
- "Kurban Said" – Ali and Nino (Ali und Nino)
- Ruth Sawyer – Roller Skates
- Dorothy L. Sayers – Busman's Honeymoon
- Margery Sharp – The Nutmeg Tree
- Bruno Schulz – Sanatorium Under the Sign of the Hourglass (Sanatorium Pod Klepsydrą)
- Naoya Shiga (志賀 直哉) – A Dark Night's Passing (暗夜行路, An'ya Kōro)
- "Siburapha" – Behind the Painting (ข้างหลังภาพ, Khang Lang Phap)
- Olaf Stapledon – Star Maker
- John Steinbeck – Of Mice and Men
- Rex Stout – The Red Box
- Cecil Street
  - Death at the Club
  - Death in the Hopfields
  - Death on the Board
  - Murder in Crown Passage
  - Proceed with Caution
- Antal Szerb – Journey by Moonlight (Utas és holdvilág)
- Phoebe Atwood Taylor
  - Figure Away
  - Octagon House
  - Beginning with a Bash (as by Alice Tilton)
- Henry Wade – The High Sheriff
- Mika Waltari – A Stranger Came to the Farm (Vieras mies tuli taloon)
- Ethel Lina White – The Elephant Never Forgets
- Charles Williams – Descent into Hell
- Virginia Woolf – The Years
- Francis Brett Young
  - Portrait of a Village
  - They Seek a Country

=== Children and young people ===
- Enid Blyton – The Adventures of the Wishing-Chair
- C. S. Forester – The Happy Return (also as Beat to Quarters)
- Eve Garnett – The Family from One End Street
- Hergé – The Broken Ear (L'Oreille cassée)
- Kornel Makuszyński – Argument About Basia (Awantura o Basię)
- Carola Oman – Robin Hood
- Arthur Ransome – We Didn't Mean To Go To Sea
- Kate Seredy – The White Stag
- Dr. Seuss – And to Think That I Saw It on Mulberry Street
- J. R. R. Tolkien – The Hobbit
- Laura Ingalls Wilder – On the Banks of Plum Creek
- Henry Winterfeld (as Manfred Michael) – Timpetill – Die Stadt ohne Eltern (Timpetill – Parentless City, translated 1963 as Trouble at Timpetill)

=== Drama ===
- Mrs. Bernie Angus – Brown Sugar
- Anthony Armstrong – Mile Away Murder
- Bertolt Brecht with Margarete Steffin – Die Gewehre der Frau Carrar (adapted from J. M. Synge's Señora Carrar's Rifles)
- Karel Čapek – The White Disease (Bílá nemoc)
- Paul Vincent Carroll – Shadow and Substance
- Jeffrey Dell – Blondie White
- Reginald Denham and Edward Percy Smith
  - The Last Straw
  - Suspect
- Ian Hay – The Gusher
- Ben Hecht – To Quito and Back
- Margaret Kennedy – Autumn
- Arthur Kober – "Having Wonderful Time"
- Richard Llewellyn – Poison Pen
- W. P. Lipscomb – Thank You, Mr. Pepys!
- Robert McLellan – Jamie the Saxt
- Robert Morley – Goodness, How Sad
- J. B. Priestley
  - I Have Been Here Before
  - Time and the Conways
- Walter Charles Roberts – Red Harvest
- Gerald Savory – George and Margaret
- Dodie Smith – Bonnet Over the Windmill
- John Van Druten – Gertie Maude
- Louis Verneuil – The Train for Venice
- Hella Wuolijoki writing as Juhani Tervapää – Juurakon Hulda
- John Ferguson, editor – Seven Famous One-Act Plays (published)

=== Poetry ===
- David Jones – In Parenthesis (part prose)
- Isaac Rosenberg (killed in action 1918) – Collected Works

=== Non-fiction ===
- Hilaire Belloc – The Crusades: the World's Debate
- Alf K. Berle and L. Sprague de Camp – Inventions and Their Management
- Robert Byron – The Road to Oxiana
- Jean Giono – Les Vraies Richesses
- Napoleon Hill – Think and Grow Rich
- Carl Jung – Dream Symbols of the Individuation Process
- Walter Lippmann – The Good Society
- John Neal – American Writers: A Series of Papers Contributed to Blackwood's Magazine (1824–1825) (edited by Fred Lewis Pattee)
- Manuel Chaves Nogales – A sangre y fuego: Héroes, bestias y mártires de España (Fire and sword: heroes, beasts and martyrs of Spain)
- George Orwell – The Road to Wigan Pier
- Eric Partridge – A Dictionary of Slang and Unconventional English
- N. Porsenna – Regenerarea neamului românesc (Regeneration of the Romanian People)
- A. L. Zissu – Logos, Israel, Biserica (Logos, Israel, The Church)

== Births ==
- January 1 – John Fuller, English poet
- January 7 – Ian La Frenais, English television comedy writer
- January 8 – Leon Forrest, African-American novelist and essayist (died 1997)
- January 9 – Judith Krantz, American novelist (died 2019)
- January 13 – Jean D'Costa, Jamaican children's novelist
- January 14 – J. Bernlef, born Hendrik Jan Marsman, Dutch poet, novelist and translator (died 2012)
- January 22 – Joseph Wambaugh, American mystery novelist and non-fiction writer (died 2025)
- January 23 – Juan Radrigán, Chilean playwright (died 2016)
- February 7 – Doris Gercke, German writer (died 2025)
- February 11 – Maryse Condé, Guadeloupe historical fiction writer (died 2024)
- February 20 – George Leonardos, Greek journalist and novelist
- February 21 – Jilly Cooper, English author and journalist (died 2025)
- February 24 – Sonallah Ibrahim, Egyptian writer (died 2025)
- February 27 – Peter Hamm, German poet, author, journalist, editor and literary critic (died 2019)
- March 14 – Jan Karon (Janice Wilson), American novelist and children's writer
- March 15 – Valentin Rasputin, Russian writer (died 2015)
- March 20 – Lois Lowry, American children's and young-adult writer
- April 10 – Bella Akhmadulina, Russian poet (died 2010)
- April 29 – Jill Paton Walsh (Gillian Bliss), English novelist (died 2020)
- May 8 – Thomas Pynchon, American novelist
- May 13
  - Roch Carrier, Canadian novelist and short-story writer
  - Roger Zelazny, American writer of fantasy and science fiction (died 1995)
- May 20 – Maria Teresa Horta, Portuguese feminist poet, novelist, journalist and activist (died 2025)
- June 1 – Colleen McCullough, Australian novelist (died 2015)
- June 16 – Erich Segal, American novelist (died 2010)
- July 3 – Tom Stoppard (Tomáš Sträussler), Czech-born English dramatist (died 2025)
- July 6 – Bessie Head, South African-born Botswanan fiction writer (died 1986)
- July 28 - Francis Veber, French screenwriter and playwright
- August 3 – Peter van Gestel, Dutch writer (died 2019)
- August 5 – Carla Lane (Romana Barrack), English comedy writer (died 2016)
- August 19
  - Richard Ingrams, English editor
  - Alexander Vampilov, Russian dramatist (drowned 1972)
- September 5 – Dick Clement, English television comedy writer
- September 23 – Jacques Poulin, Canadian novelist (died 2025)
- September 26 – Marina Colasanti, Brazilian writer (died 2025)
- October 4 – Jackie Collins, English-born romance novelist (died 2015)
- October 7 – Christopher Booker, English journalist and editor (died 2019)
- November 9
  - Roger McGough, English poet
  - S. Abdul Rahman, Tamil poet (died 2017)
- November 17 – Peter Cook, English comedian, satirist and writer (died 1995)
- December 11 – Jim Harrison, American novelist and poet (died 2016)
- December 22
  - David F. Case, American novelist and short story writer (died 2018)
  - Charlotte Lamb (Sheila Holland, Sheila Coates, etc.), English romantic novelist (died 2000)
- unknown date – Parijat (Bishnu Kumari Waiba), Nepalese novelist and poet (died 1993)

== Deaths ==
- January 5 – Alberto de Oliveira, Brazilian poet (born 1857)
- January 11 – Emma A. Cranmer, American author, reformer, suffragist (born 1858)
- February 19
  - Edward Garnett, English critic (born 1868)
  - Horacio Quiroga, Uruguayan short story writer (suicide, born 1878)
- March 7 – Tomas O'Crohan, Irish Gaelic writer and fisherman (born 1856)
- March 8 – Albert Verwey, Dutch poet (born 1865)
- March 15 – H. P. Lovecraft, American horror writer (intestinal cancer, born 1890)
- March 25 – John Drinkwater, English poet and dramatist (born 1882)
- May 20 – Frederic Taber Cooper, American editor and writer (born 1864)
- June 4 – W. F. Harvey, English horror-story writer (born 1885)
- June 13 – William F. Lloyd, English-born Newfoundland journalist and prime minister (born 1864)
- June 19 – J. M. Barrie, Scottish novelist and dramatist (born 1860)
- June 22 – Jean-Joseph Rabearivelo, Malagasy poet (suicide, born 1901 or 1903)
- July 18 – Julian Bell, English poet (killed in Spanish Civil War, born 1908)
- July 29 — Ella Maria Ballou, American writer (born 1852)
- August 11 – Edith Wharton (Edith Newbold Jones), American novelist and short-story writer (born 1862)
- August 14 – H. C. McNeile (Sapper), English novelist and soldier (born 1888)
- September 13 – Ellis Parker Butler, American humorist, novelist and essayist (born 1869)
- October 13 – Dmitrii Milev, Soviet Moldovan shorty story writer and critic (shot, born 1887)
- October 15 – Samuil Lehtțir, Soviet Moldovan poet, critic and literary theorist (shot, born 1901)
- October 16 – Jean de Brunhoff, French children's author and illustrator (born 1899)
- November 3 – Mykola Kulish, Ukrainian writer (shot with many other Ukrainian intellectuals at Sandarmokh, born 1892)
- November 3 – Mykola Zerov, Ukrainian poet, translator, classical and literary scholar and critic (shot at Sandarmokh, born 1890)
- November 3 – Valerian Pidmohylny, Ukrainian writer, (shot at Sandarmokh, born 1901)
- November 3 – Hryhorii Epik, Ukrainian writer and journalist (shot at Sandarmokh, born 1901)
- November 3 – Myroslav Irchan, Ukrainian storywriter and playwright (shot at Sandarmokh, born 1897)
- October 17 – Florence Dugdale, English children's writer, widow of Thomas Hardy (cancer, born 1879)
- October 22 – Chūya Nakahara (中原 中也), Japanese poet (meningitis, born 1907)
- October 31 – Ralph Connor, Canadian novelist (born 1860)
- c. December – Filimon Săteanu, Soviet Moldovan poet (shot, born 1907)
- December 9 – Frances Nimmo Greene, American novelist, short story writer, children's writer, playwright (born 1867)
- December 24 – Elizabeth Haldane, Scottish author, philosopher and suffragist (born 1862)
- December 26

- Ivor Gurney, English war poet and composer (tuberculosis, born 1890)
- Mrs. Alex. McVeigh Miller, American novelist (born 1850)

- December 29

- Don Marquis, American poet (stroke, born 1878)
- Frank H. Spearman, American writer (born 1859)

- unknown date — Clara H. Hazelrigg, American author, educator and reformer (born 1859)

== Awards ==
- Carnegie Medal for children's literature: Eve Garnett, The Family From One End Street
- James Tait Black Memorial Prize for fiction: Neil M. Gunn, Highland River
- James Tait Black Memorial Prize for biography: Lord Eustace Percy, John Knox
- Newbery Medal for children's literature: Ruth Sawyer, Roller Skates
- Nobel Prize in Literature: Roger Martin du Gard
- Pulitzer Prize for Drama: Moss Hart, George S. Kaufman, You Can't Take It with You
- Pulitzer Prize for Poetry: Robert Frost, A Further Range
- Pulitzer Prize for the Novel: Margaret Mitchell, Gone with the Wind
- King's Gold Medal for Poetry: W. H. Auden
