= Opinion polling for the 2024 Belgian elections =

In the run up to the 2024 Belgian federal election, various organisations carried out opinion polling to gauge voting intention in Belgium. The results of nationwide polls are usually numerically split into the three Belgian regions: Flanders, Brussels and Wallonia. Federal seat projections for the Chamber of Representatives are presented together under these regional polls. The federal election was part of a group of elections which also include the regional elections and the European elections held on the same day. Some polls might be undefined voting intentions without differentiating between the elections.

== Flanders ==
=== Federal ===

The graph and the table below show the results for the opinion polls conducted in the Flemish Region, as well as for polls conducted nationwide the part of the results related to the Flemish Region.

Date(s) conducted	Polling firm	Publisher	Sample size	N‑VA	VB	cd&v	Open Vld	Vooruit	Groen	PVDA	Others	Lead	Gov.	Opp.	Blank/ no vote/ no answer
9 June 2024	Federal election			25.6%	21.8%	12.8%	8.8%	13.0%	7.5%	8.2%	2.3%	3.8%	42.1%	57.9%	
3 – 4 June 2024	Ipsos	VTM / Het Laatste Nieuws	2,000	21.0%	25.8%	12.3%	7.0%	15.6%	6.1%	10.2%	2.0%	4.8%	41.0%	59.0%	
28 – 31 May 2024	Cluster17	RTL	1,140	19.6%	27.2%	12.0%	9.2%	13.0%	6.9%	9.3%	2.8%	7.6%	41.1%	58.2%	
14 – 20 May 2024	Ipsos	VTM / Het Laatste Nieuws / RTL / Le Soir	2,000	20.6%	26.8%	12.2%	8.2%	14.3%	6.6%	8.9%	2.4%	6.2%	41.3%	58.7%	
8 - 18 Apr 2024	Kantar	La Libre Belgique / RTBF	1016	20.9%	26.0%	11.6%	10.4%	11.5%	6.0%	12.2%	1.4%	5.1%	39.5%	60.5%	
11 – 18 Mar 2024	Ipsos	VTM / Het Laatste Nieuws / RTL / Le Soir	1,000	20.4%	27.4%	13.1%	8.3%	11.4%	7.8%	9.5%	2.1%	7.0%	40.6%	59.4%	
22 Jan – 8 Feb 2024	Kantar	Knack / Le Vif	1,077	20.6%	25.5%	10.5%	8.0%	14.7%	8.7%	10.9%	1.1%	4.9%	41.8%	58.2%	
9 – 22 Jan 2024	iVox	Het Nieuwsblad / GVA / HBVL	2,000	22.7%	26.6%	12.3%	7.6%	12.8%	7.4%	9.3%	1.4%	3.9%	42.6%	57.4%	
4 – 11 Dec 2023	Ipsos	VTM / Het Laatste Nieuws / RTL / Le Soir	1,000	22.0%	25.1%	11.7%	7.1%	13.8%	9.2%	9.7%	1.4%	3.1%	41.8%	58.2%	
23 Nov – 28 Nov 2023	iVox	Het Nieuwsblad / GVA / HBVL	1,000	22.0%	26.5%	11.6%	8.8%	14.3%	7.1%	8.7%	0.9%	4.5%	41.7%	58.3%	
10 Sep – 9 Oct 2023	Kantar	La Libre Belgique / RTBF	566	20.4%	23.3%	13.9%	7.9%	16.1%	8.2%	8.8%	1.4%	2.9%	46.1%	53.9%	
18 – 25 Sep 2023	Ipsos	VTM / Het Laatste Nieuws / RTL / Le Soir	1,000	20.2%	25.8%	12.2%	8.2%	15.4%	6.4%	9.5%	2.3%	5.6%	42.2%	57.8%	7%
29 May – 6 Jun 2023	Ipsos	VTM / Het Laatste Nieuws / RTL / Le Soir	1,000	21.8%	22.7%	10.7%	8.3%	16.8%	7.6%	10.3%	1.8%	0.9%	43.4%	56.6%	
20 – 27 Mar 2023	Ipsos	VTM / Het Laatste Nieuws / RTL / Le Soir	1,000	21.6%	25.0%	11.8%	9.2%	15.5%	7.4%	8.0%	1.5%	3.4%	43.9%	56.1%	
16 – 29 Jan 2023	Kantar	La Libre Belgique	514	21.5%	24.8%	9.6%	12.1%	15.2%	10.3%	5.7%	0.9%	3.3%	46.9%	53.1%	
21 – 29 Nov 2022	Ipsos	VTM / Het Laatste Nieuws / RTL / Le Soir	1,001	22.0%	25.5%	9.6%	9.3%	16.1%	8.7%	7.4%	1.4%	3.5%	43.7%	56.3%	
7 – 13 Sep 2022	Ipsos	VTM / Het Laatste Nieuws / RTL / Le Soir	1,000	21.5%	21.6%	9.9%	11.1%	16.8%	8.6%	8.7%	1.8%	0.1%	46.4%	53.6%	
6 – 14 Jun 2022	Ipsos	VTM / Het Laatste Nieuws / RTL / Le Soir	1,008	24.9%	22.6%	10.2%	9.3%	14.8%	7.9%	8.5%	1.8%	2.3%	42.2%	57.8%	
15 – 22 Mar 2022	Ipsos	VTM / Het Laatste Nieuws / RTL / Le Soir	1,007	23.4%	22.2%	11.3%	9.8%	14.2%	8.4%	8.9%	1.8%	1.2%	43.7%	56.3%	
1 – 8 Dec 2021	Ipsos	VTM / Het Laatste Nieuws / RTL / Le Soir	988	21.6%	24.5%	10.7%	10.3%	13.9%	8.4%	8.9%	1.7%	2.9%	43.3%	56.7%	
7 – 14 Sep 2021	Ipsos	VTM / Het Laatste Nieuws / RTL / Le Soir	1,000	21.2%	23.6%	12.6%	11.4%	12.3%	9.6%	7.7%	1.6%	2.4%	45.9%	54.1%	
25 May – 1 Jun 2021	Ipsos	VTM / Het Laatste Nieuws / RTL / Le Soir	1,002	21.8%	26.1%	10.0%	11.4%	12.6%	8.3%	7.8%	2.0%	4.3%	42.3%	57.7%	
29 Mar – 19 Apr 2021	TNS	VRT / De Standaard	1,908	21.5%	24.7%	10.0%	11.5%	12.0%	10.9%	7.9%	1.4%	3.2%	44.4%	55.5%	
4 – 9 Mar 2021	Ipsos	VTM / Het Laatste Nieuws / RTL / Le Soir	1,006	20.0%	23.6%	13.2%	12.9%	12.3%	8.2%	8.2%	1.6%	3.6%	46.6%	53.4%	
2 – 8 Dec 2020	Ipsos	VTM / Het Laatste Nieuws / RTL / Le Soir	1,007	19.9%	26.3%	12.4%	12.0%	13.6%	8.1%	6.6%	1.1%	6.4%	46.1%	53.9%	
2 – 8 Oct 2020	Ipsos	VTM / Het Laatste Nieuws / RTL / Le Soir	1,001	22.2%	27.1%	10.6%	10.9%	13.7%	7.6%	6.0%	1.9%	4.9%	42.8%	57.2%	
1 Oct 2020	De Croo Government formed with Open Vld, sp.a (currently named Vooruit), cd&v, Groen (Flemish), MR, PS and Ecolo (Francophone)														
10 – 15 Jun 2020	Ipsos	VTM / Het Laatste Nieuws / RTL / Le Soir	951	20.0%	27.7%	11.8%	10.0%	12.5%	9.4%	7.3%	1.3%	7.7%	43.7%	56.3%	
9 – 28 Apr 2020	TNS	VRT / De Standaard	2,040	20.3%	24.5%	11.9%	11.6%	11.0%	11.1%	8.2%	1.4%	4.2%	45.6%	54.4%	
4 – 9 Mar 2020	Ipsos	VTM / Het Laatste Nieuws / RTL / Le Soir / De Morgen	958	20.7%	28.0%	11.7%	10.3%	9.6%	8.8%	9.3%	1.9%	7.3%	40.4%	59.6%	
29 Nov – 6 Dec 2019	ESOMAR	VTM / Het Laatste Nieuws / RTL / Le Soir	999	22.1%	27.3%	11.4%	9.9%	8.9%	10.7%	8.4%	1.3%	5.2%	40.9%	59.1%	
2–10 Sep 2019	ESOMAR	VTM / Het Laatste Nieuws / RTL / Le Soir	1,000	22.7%	24.9%	11.7%	13.3%	8.4%	11.0%	6.2%	1.8%	2.2%	44.4%	55.6%	
26 May 2019	Federal election			25.5%	18.6%	14.2%	13.5%	10.8%	9.8%	5.6%	1.9%	6.9%	48.3%	51.6%	

=== Regional ===
Date(s) conducted	Polling firm	Publisher	Sample size	N‑VA	VB	cd&v	Open Vld	Vooruit	Groen	PVDA	Others	Lead	Gov.	Opp.	Blank/ no vote/ no answer
23 Apr – 3 May 2024	iVox	OVV	1,579	21.4%	26.3%	12.5%	7.7%	13.5%	8.2%	8.8%	1.7%	4.9%	41.9%	58.1%	
8 – 22 Jan 2024	Kantar	VRT / De Standaard	2,029	18.9%	27.8%	11.3%	9.0%	13.7%	8.2%	10.7%	0.5%	8.9%	39.2%	60.8%	10.1%
23 Nov – 28 Nov 2023	iVox	Het Nieuwsblad / GVA / HBVL	1,000	21.3%	27.5%	12.9%	8.7%	13.2%	6.9%	8.5%	0.9%	6.2%	42.9%	57.1%	
13 – 23 Mar 2023	VUB, UA	VRT / De Standaard	2,092	21.0%	24.6%	9.2%	9.3%	16.9%	7.9%	9.5%	1.6%	3.6%	39.5%	60.5%	
14 – 31 Mar 2022	VUB, UA	VRT / De Standaard	2,064	22.4%	22.9%	8.7%	10.2%	15.5%	9.4%	9.1%	1.8%	0.5%	41.3%	58.7%	
26 May 2019	Regional election			24.8%	18.5%	15.4%	13.1%	10.4%	10.1%	5.3%	2.4%	6.3%	53.3%	46.7%	

== Wallonia ==
The graph and the table below show the results for the opinion polls conducted in the Walloon Region, as well as for polls conducted nationwide the part of the results related to the Walloon Region.

Date(s) conducted	Polling firm	Publisher	Sample size	PS	MR	Ecolo	PTB	LE	DéFI	Others	Lead	Gov.	Opp.
28 – 31 May 2024	Cluster17	RTL	1,000	23.9%	23.0%	8.0%	16.0%	17.9%	4.0%	7.2%	0.9%	54.9%	45.1%
14 – 20 May 2024	Ipsos	VTM / Het Laatste Nieuws / RTL / Le Soir	1,000	22.6%	22.6%	8.8%	14.5%	18.1%	4.3%	9.1%	0.0%	54.0%	46.0%
8 - 18 Apr 2024	Kantar	La Libre Belgique, RTBF	1004	25.4%	20.8%	12.7%	16.0%	13.9%	4.2%	7.0%	4.6%	58.9%	41.1%
11 – 18 Mar 2024	Ipsos	VTM / Het Laatste Nieuws / RTL / Le Soir	1,000	21.3%	20.5%	11.9%	14.9%	16.8%	4.8%	9.8%	0.8%	53.7%	46.3%
22 Jan – 8 Feb 2024	Kantar	Knack / Le Vif	1,004	24.3%	19.9%	13.8%	18.4%	13.2%	4.1%	6.4%	3.1%	58.0%	42.0%
4 – 11 Dec 2023	Ipsos	VTM / Het Laatste Nieuws / RTL / Le Soir	1,000	23.9%	20.0%	14.0%	14.0%	13.8%	3.9%	10.4% (Note: Chez Nous 1.4%, N-VA 1.2%)	3.9%	57.9%	42.1%
10 Sep – 9 Oct 2023	Kantar	La Libre Belgique, RTBF	436	27.2%	20.6%	11.6%	19.2%	11.1%	4.5%	5.8%	6.6%	59.4%	41.6%
18 – 25 Sep 2023	Ipsos	VTM / Het Laatste Nieuws / RTL / Le Soir	1,000	21.8%	19.7%	14.9%	19.8%	13.8%	2.7%	7.3% (Note: Chez Nous 0.3%)	2.0%	56.4%	43.6%
29 May – 6 Jun 2023	Ipsos	VTM / Het Laatste Nieuws / RTL / Le Soir	1,000	25.7%	19.8%	12.7%	18.9%	10.3%	3.8%	8.8%	5.9%	58.2%	41.8%
20 – 27 Mar 2023	Ipsos	VTM / Het Laatste Nieuws / RTL / Le Soir	1,000	25.5%	18.5%	12.8%	17.6%	11.1%	4.9%	9.6%	7.0%	56.8%	43.2%
16 – 29 Jan 2023	Kantar	La Libre Belgique	502	25.8%	19.7%	11.3%	20.1%	9.3%	5.4%	8.5%	5.7%	56.8%	43.2%
21 – 29 Nov 2022	Ipsos	VTM / Het Laatste Nieuws / RTL / Le Soir	1,002	23.7%	20.4%	13.1%	17.9%	9.1%	5.3%	10.5%	3.3%	57.2%	42.8%
7 – 13 Sep 2022	Ipsos	VTM / Het Laatste Nieuws / RTL / Le Soir	1,002	22.9%	22.0%	13.6%	18.4%	9.1%	5.6%	8.0%	0.9%	58.5%	41.5%
6 – 14 Jun 2022	Ipsos	VTM / Het Laatste Nieuws / RTL / Le Soir	1,008	25.3%	19.2%	14.4%	19.1%	8.8%	4.2%	9.0%	5.9%	58.9%	41.1%
15 – 22 Mar 2022	Ipsos	VTM / Het Laatste Nieuws / RTL / Le Soir	1,009	22.4%	20.1%	15.0%	19.7%	9.5%	3.7%	9.4%	2.3%	57.7%	42.5%
1 – 8 Dec 2021	Ipsos	VTM / Het Laatste Nieuws / RTL / Le Soir	961	24.9%	22.3%	15.5%	18.2%	8.0%	4.2%	9.9%	2.6%	62.7%	37.3%
7 – 14 Sep 2021	Ipsos	VTM / Het Laatste Nieuws / RTL / Le Soir	930	21.4%	20.3%	16.7%	18.7%	10.0%	5.1%	7.8%	1.1%	58.4%	41.6%
25 May – 1 Jun 2021	Ipsos	VTM / Het Laatste Nieuws / RTL / Le Soir	992	24.0%	18.7%	15.0%	19.1%	10.8%	5.1%	7.3%	4.9%	57.7%	42.3%
4 – 9 Mar 2021	Ipsos	VTM / Het Laatste Nieuws / RTL / Le Soir	958	22.8%	20.1%	16.4%	19.0%	8.7%	3.9%	9.1%	2.7%	59.3%	40.7%
2 – 8 Dec 2020	Ipsos	VTM / Het Laatste Nieuws / RTL / Le Soir	995	23.2%	20.6%	15.6%	17.2%	10.3%	3.7%	9.7%	2.6%	59.4%	40.6%
2 – 8 Oct 2020	Ipsos	VTM / Het Laatste Nieuws / RTL / Le Soir	1,001	21.1%	19.2%	17.8%	18.9%	9.7%	3.8%	9.5%	1.9%	58.1%	41.9%
1 Oct 2020	De Croo Government formed with Open Vld, sp.a (currently named Vooruit), cd&v, Groen (Flemish), MR, PS and Ecolo (Francophone)												
10 – 15 Jun 2020	Ipsos	VTM / Het Laatste Nieuws / RTL / Le Soir	986	23.7%	20.5%	15.1%	18.7%	8.1%	4.7%	9.2%	3.2%	59.3%	40.7%
4 – 9 Mar 2020	Ipsos	VTM / Het Laatste Nieuws / RTL / Le Soir / De Morgen	974	25.5%	19.6%	15.5%	18.6%	7.5%	5.1%	8.2%	5.9%	60.6%	39.4%
29 Nov – 6 Dec 2019	ESOMAR	VTM / Het Laatste Nieuws / RTL / Le Soir	983	23.8%	20.5%	17.2%	16.5%	8.8%	4.7%	8.5%	3.3%	61.5%	38.5%
2–10 Sep 2019	ESOMAR	VTM / Het Laatste Nieuws / RTL / Le Soir	992	22.9%	22.6%	16.2%	15.5%	8.5%	5.0%	9.3%	0.3%	61.7%	38.3%
26 May 2019	Federal election			26.1%	20.5%	14.9%	13.8%	10.7%	4.1%	9.9% (Note: Includes the People's Party, which dissolved in June 2019 after the elections)	5.6%	61.5%	38.5%

== Brussels ==
The graph and the table below show polling results in the Brussels Region (which may be part of a larger, nationwide poll). In September 2022, only polling results for Francophone parties were published for polls conducted for VTM / Het Laatste Nieuws / RTL / Le Soir.

Scatter plot with moving average showing the results of the polls in the Brussels Region since the last federal elections.

Date(s) conducted	Polling firm	Publisher	Sample size	Ecolo	PS	MR	PTB- PVDA	DéFI	LE	N‑VA	Open Vld	VB	cd&v	Groen	Vooruit	Others	Lead	Gov.	Opp.
28 – 31 May 2024	Cluster17	RTL	501	11.6%	15.0%	22.9%	19.8%	7.0%	7.8%							3.2%	3.1%		
14 – 20 May 2024	Ipsos	VTM / Het Laatste Nieuws / RTL / Le Soir	600	12.5%	15.2%	23.3%	19.8%	7.2%	7.7%								3.5%		
8 - 18 Apr 2024	Kantar	La Libre Belgique, RTBF	807	15.5%	14.2%	22.9%	15.4%	7.4%	5.4%	3.8%	1.2%	5.0%	1.6%	4.6%	1.0%	2.0%	7.4%	61.0%	39.0%
11 – 18 Mar 2024	Ipsos	VTM / Het Laatste Nieuws / RTL / Le Soir	600	14.7%	15.4%	21.8%	17.5%	8.8%	6.9%	2.2%	2.2%	3.0%	1.3%	1.0%	1.3%	3.9%	4.3%	57.7%	42.3%
22 Jan – 8 Feb 2024	Kantar	Knack / Le Vif	600	14.2%	13.5%	17.9%	20.8%	7.8%	5.4%	3.8%	1.9%	5.2%	1.2%	5.3%	1.3%	1.3%	2.9%	55.3%	44.7%
4 – 11 Dec 2023	Ipsos	VTM / Het Laatste Nieuws / RTL / Le Soir	600	16.8%	15.7%	18.1%	19.3%	9.1%	7.2%	3.4%	2.0%	3.0%	0.5%	1.9%	0.7%	2.3%	1.2%	55.7%	44.3%
10 Sep – 9 Oct 2023	Kantar	La Libre Belgique, RTBF	545	13.0%	18.8%	19.7%	16.3%	6.9%	5.1%	5.3%	3.3%	4.2%	0.8%	4.2%	1.3%	1.2%	0.9%	61.1%	38.9%
18 – 25 Sep 2023	Ipsos	VTM / Het Laatste Nieuws / RTL / Le Soir	600	17.9%	18.1%	21.9%	15.3%	8.0%	6.5%	3.6%	1.2%	2.3%	0.6%	0.8%	1.8%	2.0%	3.8%	62.3%	37.7%
29 May – 6 Jun 2023	Ipsos	VTM / Het Laatste Nieuws / RTL / Le Soir	600	18.1%	18.6%	19.9%	17.6%	8.3%	4.3%	2.9%	1.4%	3.1%	0.9%	1.3%	0.6%	3.0%	1.3%	60.8%	39.2%
20 – 27 Mar 2023	Ipsos	VTM / Het Laatste Nieuws / RTL / Le Soir	600	15.7%	16.8%	19.8%	19.4%	10.2%	5.1%	3.0%	0.8%	3.0%	0.5%	1.8%	2.0%	1.9%	0.4%	57.4%	42.6%
16 – 29 Jan 2023	Kantar	La Libre Belgique	493	16.0%	18.0%	16.8%	16.7%	9.6%	2.9%	4.5%	1.2%	2.6%	1.0%	6.1%	1.6%	3.1%	1.2%	60.7%	39.3%
21 – 29 Nov 2022	Ipsos	VTM / Het Laatste Nieuws / RTL / Le Soir	601	13.0%	21.6%	20.3%	16.1%	10.4%	6.1%	2.8%	0.8%	2.5%	1.8%	1.0%	0.3%	3.3%	1.3%	58.8%	41.2%
7 – 13 Sep 2022	Ipsos	VTM / Het Laatste Nieuws / RTL / Le Soir	600	15.8%	22.7%	21.2%	12.7%	9.6%	3.8%								1.6%		
6 – 14 Jun 2022	Ipsos	VTM / Het Laatste Nieuws / RTL / Le Soir	536	18.0%	19.1%	22.0%	13.6%	10.8%	3.8%	2.8%	2.0%	2.2%	0.6%	1.4%	0.9%	2.8%	2.9%	64.0%	36.0%
15 – 22 Mar 2022	Ipsos	VTM / Het Laatste Nieuws / RTL / Le Soir	485	20.3%	15.1%	19.9%	16.4%	10.8%	4.9%	3.5%	1.6%	2.3%	0.2%	3.0%	1.0%	1.0%	0.4%	61.1%	38.9%
1 – 8 Dec 2021	Ipsos	VTM / Het Laatste Nieuws / RTL / Le Soir	485	19.3%	15.1%	17.4%	15.1%	11.3%	5.2%	3.0%	2.9%	3.3%	1.3%	0.6%	0.3%	5.2%	1.9%	56.9%	43.1%
7 – 14 Sep 2021	Ipsos	VTM / Het Laatste Nieuws / RTL / Le Soir	485	19.1%	18.6%	18.5%	15.1%	10.4%	3.7%	2.6%	2.4%	1.5%	0.6%	2.5%	0.8%	4.2%	0.5%	62.5%	37.7%
25 May – 1 Jun 2021	Ipsos	VTM / Het Laatste Nieuws / RTL / Le Soir	523	18.0%	17.6%	17.9%	15.0%	11.1%	5.3%	4.1%	2.5%	3.1%	0.7%	2.8%	0.5%	1.4%	0.1%	60.0%	40.0%
4 – 9 Mar 2021	Ipsos	VTM / Het Laatste Nieuws / RTL / Le Soir	557	18.2%	16.8%	16.4%	16.0%	11.4%	4.0%	2.9%	2.8%	3.2%	1.5%	2.4%	1.1%	3.3%	1.4%	59.2%	40.8%
2 – 8 Dec 2020	Ipsos	VTM / Het Laatste Nieuws / RTL / Le Soir	533	19.5%	16.8%	15.0%	15.1%	11.5%	5.0%	4.9%	1.9%	3.7%	0.3%	2.8%	1.4%	0.6%	2.7%	57.7%	42.3%
2 – 8 Oct 2020	Ipsos	VTM / Het Laatste Nieuws / RTL / Le Soir	593	21.6%	19.1%	14.0%	12.1%	11.3%	3.2%	4.8%	2.4%	3.7%	1.7%	3.2%	2.3%	0.6%	2.5%	64.3%	35.7%
1 October 2020	De Croo Government formed with Open Vld, sp.a (currently named Vooruit), cd&v, Groen (Flemish), MR, PS and Ecolo (Francophone)																		
10 – 15 Jun 2020	Ipsos	VTM / Het Laatste Nieuws / RTL / Le Soir	580	19.1%	18.2%	17.4%	12.6%	10.9%	4.8%	4.9%	1.4%	3.7%	1.5%	1.8%	0.7%	3.0%	0.9%	60.1%	39.9%
4 – 9 Mar 2020	Ipsos	VTM / Het Laatste Nieuws / RTL / Le Soir	531	20.3%	20.5%	17.6%	12.2%	10.0%	3.8%	4.1%	0.9%	3.3%	0.9%	1.4%	1.4%	3.6%	0.2%	63%	37%
29 Nov – 6 Dec 2019	ESOMAR	VTM / Het Laatste Nieuws / RTL / Le Soir	526	19.7%	18.9%	16.2%	12.5%	12.0%	5.1%	4.8%	2.2%	1.9%	0.9%	2.8%	0.5%	2.2%	0.8%	61.2%	38.8%
2–10 Sep 2019	ESOMAR	VTM / Het Laatste Nieuws / RTL / Le Soir	548	21.4%	19.2%	16.4%	11.0%	11.0%	4.9%	3.6%	2.4%	2.5%	0.2%	3.1%	1.0%	3.3%	2.2%	63.7%	36.3%
26 May 2019	Federal election			21.6%	20.0%	17.5%	12.3%	10.3%	5.8%	3.2%	2.3%	1.6%	1.3%	Ecolo	PS	4.3%	1.6%	62.7%	37.3%

== Seat projections ==
The graph and table below shows seat projections for the Chamber of Representatives according to a reporting newspaper or polling firm.

=== By party ===
76 seats needed for majority
Date(s) conducted	Polling firm	Publishers	N‑VA	PS	VB	MR	Ecolo	cd&v	Open Vld	PVDA- PTB	Vooruit	Groen	LE	DéFI	Others	Lead	Gov.	Opp.	Lead
9 June 2024	Federal election		**24**	16	20	20	3	11	7	15	13	6	14	1	0	4	76	**74**	1
28 – 31 May 2024	Cluster17	RTL	20	18	**26**	18	4	10	7	20	11	5	10	1	0	6	73	**77**	4
14 – 20 May 2024	Ipsos	VTM / Het Laatste Nieuws / RTL / Le Soir	20	16	**26**	18	4	10	7	19	12	5	12	1	0	6	72	**78**	6
8 - 18 Apr 2024	Kantar	La Libre Belgique / RTBF	19	18	**26**	14	8	10	11	20	10	4	9	1	0	6	**75**	**75**	0
11 – 18 Mar 2024	Ipsos	VTM / Het Laatste Nieuws / RTL / Le Soir	20	16	**27**	15	9	11	6	19	10	5	10	2	0	7	72	**78**	6
22 Jan – 8 Feb 2024	Kantar	Knack / Le Vif	19	16	**25**	15	10	10	6	21	13	7	7	1	0	4	**77**	73	4
4 – 11 Dec 2023	Ipsos	VTM / Het Laatste Nieuws / RTL / Le Soir	21	18	**25**	14	10	10	5	19	11	7	8	2	0	4	**75**	**75**	0
10 Sep – 9 Oct 2023	Kantar	La Libre Belgique	**21**	19	**21**	16	9	10	6	20	16	6	5	1	0	0	**82**	69	13
18 – 25 Sep 2023	Ipsos	VTM / Het Laatste Nieuws / RTL / Le Soir	19	16	**26**	16	10	10	6	20	14	4	8	1	0	6	**76**	74	2
29 May – 6 Jun 2023	Ipsos	VTM / Het Laatste Nieuws / RTL / Le Soir	20	20	**22**	15	10	10	6	21	16	5	4	1	0	1	**82**	68	14
20 – 27 Mar 2023	Ipsos	VTM / Het Laatste Nieuws / RTL / Le Soir	20	20	**24**	14	10	10	8	18	14	5	5	2	0	4	**83**	67	16
16 – 29 Jan 2023	3rd party analysis based on Kantar	La Libre Belgique	21	19	**24**	14	10	6	10	17	14	9	4	2	0	3	**82**	68	14
21 – 29 Nov 2022	Ipsos	VTM / Het Laatste Nieuws / RTL / Le Soir	20	19	**25**	15	9	8	7	18	15	7	5	2	0	5	**80**	70	10
7 – 13 Sep 2022	Ipsos	VTM / Het Laatste Nieuws / RTL / Le Soir	**20**	18	**20**	17	10	9	9	18	15	7	4	3	0	0	**85**	65	20
6 – 14 Jun 2022	Ipsos	VTM / Het Laatste Nieuws / RTL / Le Soir	**25**	19	21	15	11	9	7	20	12	5	4	2	0	4	**78**	72	6
15 – 22 Mar 2022	Ipsos	VTM / Het Laatste Nieuws / RTL / Le Soir	**23**	17	21	15	12	10	7	21	12	6	4	2	0	2	**79**	71	8
1 – 8 Dec 2021	Ipsos	VTM / Het Laatste Nieuws / RTL / Le Soir	20	17	**24**	16	11	10	9	19	11	6	5	2	0	4	**80**	70	10
7 – 14 Sep 2021	Ipsos	VTM / Het Laatste Nieuws / RTL / Le Soir	20	16	**22**	15	13	11	10	18	10	9	4	2	0	2	**84**	66	18
25 May – 1 Jun 2021	Ipsos	VTM / Het Laatste Nieuws / RTL / Le Soir	20	18	**25**	14	12	9	10	17	11	7	5	2	0	5	**81**	69	12
4 – 9 Mar 2021	Ipsos	VTM / Het Laatste Nieuws / RTL / Le Soir	20	16	**22**	15	13	11	11	19	11	6	4	2	0	2	**83**	67	16
2 – 8 Dec 2020	Ipsos	VTM / Het Laatste Nieuws / RTL / Le Soir	20	17	**25**	15	12	10	10	17	12	5	5	2	0	5	**81**	69	12
2 – 8 Oct 2020	Ipsos	VTM / Het Laatste Nieuws / RTL / Le Soir	21	17	**25**	14	14	10	10	16	12	5	4	2	0	4	**82**	68	14
10 – 15 Jun 2020	Ipsos	VTM / Het Laatste Nieuws / RTL / Le Soir	20	19	**26**	14	12	10	9	17	10	7	4	2	0	6	**81**	69	12
4 – 9 Mar 2020	Ipsos	VTM / Het Laatste Nieuws / RTL / Le Soir	19	19	**26**	14	13	10	9	19	7	8	4	2	0	7	**80**	70	10
29 Nov – 6 Dec 2019	ESOMAR	VTM / Het Laatste Nieuws / RTL / Le Soir	20	18	**27**	14	13	10	8	18	6	9	5	2	0	7	**78**	72	6
2–10 Sep 2019	ESOMAR	VTM / Het Laatste Nieuws / RTL / Le Soir	21	17	**25**	17	13	11	11	14	6	9	4	2	0	4	**84**	66	18
26 May 2019	Federal election		**25**	20	18	14	13	12	12	12	9	8	5	2	0	5	**88**	62	26

=== By political family ===
Below are tallies for each ideological 'group' as well as probable coalitions. In bold on dark grey, if the coalition commands an absolute majority.

Note that "asymmetrical" coalitions are now frequent: between 2007 and 2011, PS was part of each cabinet but not sp.a (Vooruit); and between 2014 and 2018, the Michel Government included cd&v but not cdH (LE), as well as the N-VA, of which there is no equivalent in Wallonia.

==== Political family seat projections ====

Date(s) conducted	Polling firm	Ideologies								Coalitions												
Date(s) conducted	Polling firm	Far-left	Greens	Soc- Dems	Soc Libs	Libs	Chr Dems (Note: Includes LE, which broke with their Christian democratic tradition on 17 March 2022)	Flemish Nation-alist	Far-right	Left- wing	Big Olive Tree	Olive Tree	Purple- Green (Note: Example of a Purple-Green coalition: Verhofstadt I Government)	Vivaldi (+ LE)	National Unity	Tri-partite	Arizona	Sunset	Purple-Yellow	Swedish + LE (Note: Example of a Swedish coalition: Michel I Government)	Centre- right	Right- wing
**9 June 2024**	**Federal; Elections**	**15**	**9**	**29**	**1**	**27**	**25**	**24**	**20**	**53**	**81**	**63**	**65**	**76 (90)**	114	**81**	105	**78**	**80**	**76**	96	**71**
14 - 20 May 2024	Ipsos	19	9	**28**	1	25	22	20	26	56	**78**	59	62	72 **(84)**	104	75	95	70	73	67	93	71
8 - 18 Apr 2024	Kantar	20	12	**28**	1	25	19	19	26	60	**79**	59	65	75 **(84)**	103	72	91	66	72	63	89	70
1 – 18 Mar 2024	Ipsos	19	14	26	2	21	21	20	**27**	59	**80**	61	61	72 **(82)**	102	68	87	67	67	62	89	68
22 Jan – 8 Feb 2024	Kantar	21	17	**29**	1	21	17	19	25	67	**84**	63	67	**77** **(84)**	103	67	86	65	69	57	82	65
4 – 11 Dec 2023	Ipsos	19	17	**29**	2	19	18	21	25	65	**83**	64	65	75 **(83)**	104	66	87	68	69	58	83	65
10 Sep – 9 Oct 2023	Kantar	20	15	**35**	1	22	15	21	21	70	**85**	65	72	**82 (87)**	108	72	93	71	**78**	58	79	64
18 – 25 Sep 2023	Ipsos	20	14	**30**	1	22	18	19	26	64	**82**	62	66	**76 (84)**	103	70	89	67	71	59	85	67
29 May – 6 Jun 2023	Ipsos	21	15	**36**	1	21	14	20	22	72	**86**	65	72	**82 (86)**	106	71	91	70	**77**	55	77	63
20–27 Mar 2023	Ipsos	18	15	**34**	2	22	15	20	24	67	**82**	64	71	**81 (86)**	106	71	91	69	**76**	57	81	66
16–29 Jan 2023	3rd party analysis based on Kantar	17	19	**33**	2	24	10	21	24	69	**79**	62	**76**	**82 (86)**	107	67	88	64	**78**	55	79	69
21–29 Nov 2022	Ipsos	18	16	**34**	2	22	13	20	25	68	**81**	63	72	**80 (85)**	105	69	89	67	**76**	55	80	67
7–13 Sep 2022	Ipsos	18	17	**33**	3	26	13	20	20	68	**81**	63	**76**	**85 (89)**	109	72	92	66	**79**	59	79	66
6–14 Jun 2022	Ipsos	20	16	**31**	2	22	13	25	21	67	**80**	60	69	**78 (82)**	107	66	91	69	**78**	60	81	68
15–22 Mar 2022	Ipsos	21	18	**29**	2	22	14	23	21	68	**82**	61	69	**79 (83)**	106	65	88	66	74	59	80	66
1–8 Dec 2021	Ipsos	19	17	**28**	2	25	15	20	24	64	**79**	60	70	**80 (85)**	105	68	88	63	73	60	84	69
7–14 Sep 2021	Ipsos	18	22	**26**	2	25	15	20	22	66	**81**	63	73	**84 (88)**	108	66	86	61	71	60	82	67
25 May – 1 Jun 2021	Ipsos	17	19	**29**	2	24	14	20	25	65	**79**	62	72	**81 (86)**	106	67	87	63	73	58	83	69
4–9 Mar 2021	Ipsos	19	19	**27**	2	26	15	20	22	65	**80**	61	72	**83 (87)**	107	68	88	62	73	61	83	68
2–10 Dec 2020	Ipsos	17	17	**29**	2	25	15	20	25	63	**78**	61	71	**81 (86)**	106	69	89	64	74	60	85	70
2–10 Oct 2020	Ipsos	16	19	**29**	2	24	14	21	25	64	**78**	62	71	**82 (86)**	107	67	88	64	74	59	84	70
10–15 Jun 2020	Ipsos	17	19	**29**	2	23	14	20	26	65	**79**	62	71	**81 (85)**	105	66	86	63	72	57	83	69
4–9 Mar 2020	Ipsos	19	21	**26**	2	23	14	19	**26**	66	**80**	61	70	**80 (84)**	105	63	82	66	68	56	82	68
29 Nov – 6 Dec 2019	ESOMAR	18	22	24	2	22	15	20	**27**	64	**79**	61	68	**78 (83)**	105	61	81	59	66	57	84	69
2–10 Sep 2019	ESOMAR	14	22	23	2	**28**	15	21	25	59	74	60	73	**84 (88)**	109	66	86	59	72	67	89	74
**26 May 2019**	**Federal; Elections**	**12**	**21**	**29**	**2**	**26**	**17**	**25**	**18**	**62**	**79**	**67**	**76**	**88 (93)**	120	**72**	97	**71**	**80**	**68**	86	**69**

== European Parliament election ==
=== Dutch-speaking ===
Date(s) conducted	Polling firm	Publisher	Sample size	N‑VA ECR	VB ID	Open Vld Renew	cd&v EPP	Groen G/EFA	Vooruit S&D	PVDA Left	Others	Lead
23 Feb – 5 Mar 2024	Ipsos	Euronews	1,500	18.7% 3	23.5% 3	12.7% 2	11.5% 1	9.7% 1	13.8% 2	9.3% 1	0.8% 0	4.8%
26 May 2019	European election			22.4% 3	19.1% 3	15.9% 2	14.5% 2	12.4% 1	10.2% 1	4.9% 0	0.5% 0	3.3%

=== French-speaking ===
Date(s) conducted	Polling firm	Publisher	Sample size	PS S&D	Ecolo G/EFA	MR Renew	PTB Left	LE EPP	DéFI NI	Others	Lead
23 Feb – 5 Mar 2024	Ipsos	Euronews	1,500	26.7% 2	12.8% 1	22.8% 2	19.2% 2	11.0% 1	2.8% 0	4.7% 0	3.9%
26 May 2019	European election			26.7% 2	19.9% 2	19.3% 2	14.6% 1	8.9% 1	5.9% 0	4.7% 0	6.8%

== See also ==
- Opinion polling for the 2019 Belgian federal election
- Opinion polling for the 2029 Belgian elections
- List of political parties in Belgium
