= Uncensored (novel) =

1937 novel

- First edition
- Author: Oscar Millard
- Language: English
- Genre: War
- Publisher: Robert Hale
- Publication date: 1937
- Publication place: United Kingdom
- Media type: Print

Uncensored is a 1937 novel by British writer Oscar Millard. It takes place during the German occupation of Belgium in the First World War. It was inspired by the real-life underground newspaper La Libre Belgique run by the country's resistance movement.

== Adaptation ==
In 1942 it was made into a film of the same title directed by Anthony Asquith and starring Eric Portman, Phyllis Calvert and Griffith Jones. Produced by Gainsborough Pictures, it updated the story's setting to the contemporary Second World War German occupation of the country.

== Bibliography ==
- Goble, Alan. The Complete Index to Literary Sources in Film. Walter de Gruyter, 1999.
