= Oscar Millard =

American screenwriter

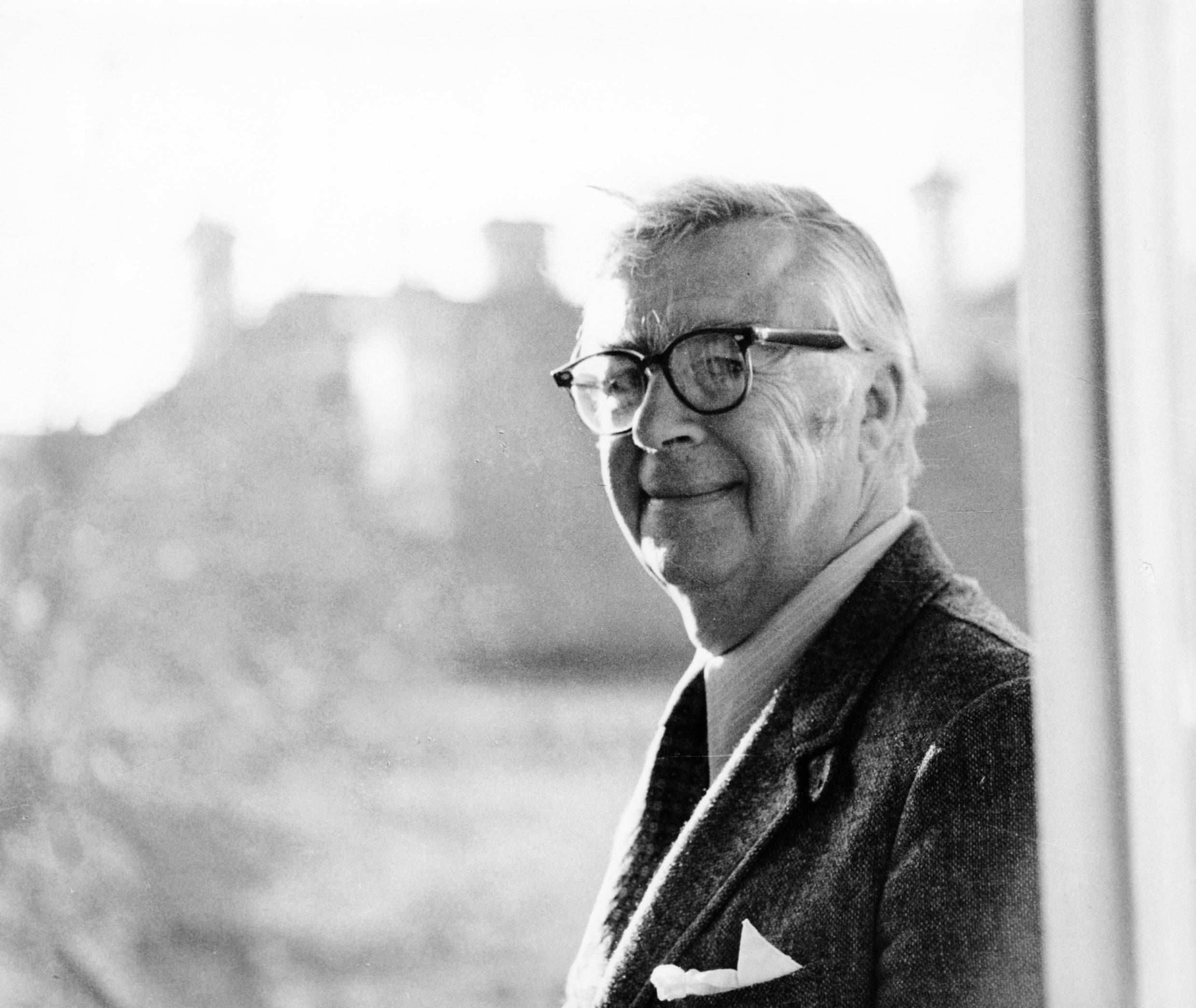
Oscar Millard 1986 in Salzburg (A)

Oscar Millard (March 1, 1908 – December 7, 1990) was an English writer who published two books set in Belgium before finding success in Hollywood as a screenwriter.

== Author ==
In 1936 Millard published a biography of Adolphe Max, who had been mayor of Brussels during the First World War and had been imprisoned for refusing to cooperate with the occupying forces. He followed this in 1937 with a novel inspired by the clandestine wartime newspaper La Libre Belgique, entitled Uncensored. In 1942, this was adapted for the screen as Uncensored, with Terence Rattigan as the main scriptwriter. The setting was updated to the contemporary German occupation of Belgium during World War II.

== Screenwriter ==
Hollywood success came after the war, when Millard collaborated on the screenplay for Come to the Stable, a comedy about nuns. He fared better the following year when he picked up an Academy Award nomination for the gritty war movie The Frogmen (1951).

Millard's output after that was less successful though interesting: the James Stewart thriller No Highway in the Sky (1951) and Otto Preminger's full-guns-blazing femme fatale movie Angel Face (1952).

Millard's reputation was considerably tarnished after writing the John Wayne-Susan Hayward barbarian epic The Conqueror (1956). The film was panned by critics, and a legend circulated that filming downwind of a lake bed where the Atomic Energy Commission had tested 11 nuclear weapons the year before caused a cancer outbreak among the cast and crew; in reality, the number of people associated with the film that developed cancer was about the same, percentage-wise, as the general US population.

After that, Millard found consistent work on television, writing scripts for such shows as Wagon Train, The Alfred Hitchcock Hour for which his was awarded in 2013 by the Writers Guild of America (101 Best written TV Series) and Twelve O'Clock High.

== Journalist ==
During the last two decades of his life, Millard contributed articles about Hollywood to the Los Angeles Times. To the New York Times, he contributed travel articles about Austria, where he traveled extensively and met his second wife.

== Filmography ==
- Uncensored (1942)
- Come to the Stable (1949)
- The Frogmen (1951)
- No Highway in the Sky (1951)
- Angel Face (1953)
- Second Chance (1953)
- The Conqueror (1956)
- Song Without End (1960)
- Dead Ringer (1964)
- The Reward (1965)
- The Salzburg Connection (1972)
