= More Joy in Heaven =

1937 novel by Morley Callaghan

- Recent paperback edition cover
- Author: Morley Callaghan
- Language: English
- Genre: Novel
- Publisher: Random House
- Publication date: 1937
- Publication place: Canada
- Media type: Print (Hardback)
- Pages: 278 pp (first edition, hardback)
- Preceded by: Now That April's Here and Other Stories
- Followed by: Luke Baldwin's Vow

More Joy in Heaven is a novel written by Canadian author Morley Callaghan and published in 1937. The central figure, Kip Caley, was inspired by Norman Ryan (1895-1936), a criminal who had committed a number of robberies in Quebec, Ontario and the United States. The title derives from the biblical quote "I say to you, that likewise joy shall be in heaven over one sinner that repents, more than over ninety and nine just persons, which need no repentance." Luke 15:7.

Callaghan's friend Ernest Hemingway had also considered writing a novel based on Ryan's life. As a reporter for The Toronto Daily Star, Hemingway had covered the criminal in 1925. Dramatised as a radio play by Donald Jack for CBC Theatre 10:30.

== Plot introduction ==
Powerful and moving Story of an Ex-Criminal's struggle for rehabilitation.

== Synopsis ==
The story of Kip Caley, an ex-criminal, intent on becoming a useful and honourable human being. His struggle with himself and with a society which will not let him regain his human dignity.

== List of Main Characters ==
Kip Caley-protagonist, Kip was in jail for 10 years for robbing banks all around the six. Kip was let out around Christmas( a time for new beginnings). He tries to have a normal and simple life after he is out but is glamorized by local reporters and journalists.

Other important characters in the book are Julie, Father Butler, Senator Maclean, Kip's mother, Harvey Jenkins, Judge Ford, Foley and Kerrmann.
