= Death at Low Tide =

1938 novel

- First edition (UK)
- Author: Cecil Street
- Language: English
- Series: Desmond Merrion
- Genre: Detective
- Publisher: Collins Crime Club (UK); Doubleday (US)
- Publication date: 1938
- Publication place: United Kingdom
- Media type: Print
- Preceded by: Murder in Crown Passage
- Followed by: The Platinum Cat

Death at Low Tide is a 1938 detective novel by the British writer Cecil Street, writing under the pen name of Miles Burton. It is the seventeenth in a series of books featuring the Golden Age amateur detective Desmond Merrion and Inspector Arnold of Scotland Yard. A review in the Times Literary Supplement declared "this is probably the best work of an author who has already had many brilliant successes". However The Observer noted "Miles Burton still remains faithful to the Crofts school in his austere refusal to develop a style."

== Synopsis ==
In a small West Country port one summer evening a ferryman fishes a body of the harbour at low tide. It proves to be the unpopular harbour master, whose plans to transform a seaside resort into an industrial port has made him many enemies. Shot through the head it is a clear case of murder, and the services of Arnold and his friend Merrion are called in to investigate.

== Bibliography ==
- Evans, Curtis. Masters of the "Humdrum" Mystery: Cecil John Charles Street, Freeman Wills Crofts, Alfred Walter Stewart and the British Detective Novel, 1920-1961. McFarland, 2014.
- Herbert, Rosemary. Whodunit?: A Who's Who in Crime & Mystery Writing. Oxford University Press, 2003.
- Reilly, John M. Twentieth Century Crime & Mystery Writers. Springer, 2015.
