= The Frogmen =

1951 American black and white WWII drama film by Lloyd Bacon

- Theatrical release poster
- Directed by: Lloyd Bacon
- Written by: John Tucker Battle; Oscar Millard (story)
- Produced by: Samuel G. Engel
- Starring: Richard Widmark; Dana Andrews; Gary Merrill
- Cinematography: Norbert Brodine
- Edited by: William Reynolds
- Music by: Cyril J. Mockridge
- Distributed by: Twentieth Century-Fox
- Release dates: June 29, 1951 (New York); July 13, 1951 (Los Angeles)
- Running time: 96 minutes
- Country: United States
- Language: English
- Box office: $2.1 million (US rentals)

The Frogmen is a 1951 American black-and-white World War II drama film distributed by Twentieth Century-Fox, produced by Samuel G. Engel, directed by Lloyd Bacon and starring Richard Widmark, Dana Andrews and Gary Merrill. The plot is based on the divers of the United States Navy Underwater Demolition Team, popularly known as "frogmen", against the Japanese Army and naval forces. It was the first film about scuba diving and became a popular cultural hit.

== Plot ==
During World War II, Navy Lt. Cmdr. John Lawrence, a strict disciplinarian, is given charge of Underwater Demolition Team 4 after its former leader, Lt. Cmdr. Jack Cassidy, is killed in action. The unit's men are distrustful of Lawrence and they brawl with sailors aboard their transport ship. The ship's captain, Lt. Cmdr. Pete Vincent, understands the resentment that the elite UDT men feel over the death of Cassidy, which they have transferred to Lawrence, and offers leniency for the team at captain's mast. Lawrence holds his own mast and disciplines the team just before a dangerous mission to locate a safe landing beach for an upcoming invasion of a Japanese-held island. Lawrence is scornfully perceived as afraid when he divides the platoon and places executive officer Lt. Klinger in charge of a diversion to the more dangerous beach, where the main landing is scheduled.

During the mission, Lawrence cuts his leg on coral, and the diversionary section's transport boat is hit by artillery, killing Klinger and most of his men. Lawrence sees that two frogmen, including Chief Jake Flannigan, are still in the water, but rather than risk loss of the information already gathered, orders a rescue boat and continues back to the transport. The men are saved, but Lawrence's apparently cowardly action increases the ill will toward him. Flannigan and some of the others request transfer to another unit, but Lawrence insists that they first complete the next day's mission to clear the landing site for the invasion.

The next morning, Lawrence, who is sick with coral poisoning, does not reveal his illness when he leaves Flannigan in charge of the mission and stays behind. Convinced that Lawrence is a coward, the men angrily but efficiently complete their task, although "Pappy" Creighton, whose brother is a U.S. Marine, sneaks onto the beach with Flannigan to leave a sign welcoming the Marines. Creighton is shot after the prank, but Flannigan tows him to the pickup boat. Back on the ship, Creighton is in traction because of the bullets in his spine, and Flannigan confesses to Lawrence that the prank caused Creighton's injuries. Lawrence furiously upbraids Flannigan and all of the men request transfers.

While Lawrence is discussing the transfer requests with Vincent, a torpedo hits the ship but does not detonate. Lawrence volunteers to disarm the torpedo, which has lodged in the sick bay next to Creighton's bed, and, with Flannigan's help, succeeds. Lawrence receives orders to destroy a Japanese submarine pen and tells the men that although it will be their last mission together, he is proud to have served with them. Although Flannigan voices disdain that Lawrence will again dodge dangerous duty, Lawrence leads the mission, which is discovered when one of the men accidentally trips a signal wire. Japanese sentries shoot at the men as they plant the charges, and Lawrence is stabbed in hand-to-hand combat with a Japanese diver. He orders Flannigan to leave him behind, but Flannigan tows him to safety. The mission is a success, and Lawrence recuperates beside Creighton. Swayed by Lawrence's bravery, the men now accept him by asking him to sign the portrait they have drawn of Cassidy to present to his widow.

== Cast ==
- Richard Widmark as Lt. Cmdr. John Lawrence
- Dana Andrews as Chief Jake Flannigan
- Gary Merrill as Lt. Cmdr. Pete Vincent
- Jeffrey Hunter as "Pappy" Creighton
- Warren Stevens as Ralph Hodges
- Robert Wagner as Lt. (jg) Franklin
- Harvey Lembeck as Marvin W. "Canarsie" Mikowsky
- Robert Rockwell as Lt. Bill Doyle
- Henry Slate as "Sleepy"

== Production ==
The Underwater Demolition Team has been deployed since World War II for reconnaissance duties, clearing underwater obstacles planted by the enemy, executing advance landings on beaches and launching underwater attacks on enemy ships. The team was the forerunner of the Navy SEALs. Many Navy SEALs have cited this film as their inspiration for joining the SEAL teams, including Richard Marcinko (the first commanding officer of SEAL Team Six and Red Cell), the Medal of Honor recipient Michael E. Thornton and Dennis Chalker.

Producer Paul Short of Allied Artists protested the use of the title The Frogmen by Twentieth Century-Fox, asserting that he had established prior claim to it. Eventually, Short dropped his claim and Twentieth Century-Fox was allowed to use the title. Several major studios were interested in producing films about the Underwater Demolition Team, but only Twentieth Century-Fox obtained an exclusive guarantee of cooperation from the U.S. Navy.

Henry Hathaway was originally set to direct the film, which was to feature Millard Mitchell in a starring role. Richard Conte was also originally set to play Pete Vincent, while Jack Elam was first cast as Sleepy and Craig Hill was set to play Lt. J. G. Franklin. Assistant director Dick Mayberry briefly substituted for director Lloyd Bacon when Bacon fell ill with influenza. Because of the production's working conditions, all female roles were removed from the screenplay and none appears in the completed film.

The filming of the submarine sequence took place on the deck of USS Kleinsmith while the ship was near Key West, Florida on January 11, 1951. Much of the boat and high-speed transport scenes were shot between January 15 and February 6 from the deck of Kleinsmith while the ship was near Saint Thomas, U.S. Virgin Islands. USS Taconic (AGC-17) appears as the command ship. The script mentions the USS Jack, but the ship was not used in the film, as it was commissioned at the time.

Producer Samuel Engel wrote an original story titled "Frogmen in Korea" as a sequel to The Frogmen, but the project soon dissolved. A one-hour television remake of The Frogmen titled Deep Water was broadcast in May 1957 on The 20th Century Fox Hour. The program was directed by Roy Del Ruth and starred Ralph Meeker (Lawrence), James Whitmore (Flannigan) and Richard Arlen (Vincent).

== Reception ==
In a contemporary review for The New York Times, critic Thomas M. Pryor called The Frogmen "an expert blending of fact and fiction that adds up to a fast-paced action drama" and wrote: "It the Navy and the script writers won't object too strenuously, a landlubber might dare to mention that some of the things the boys do are obviously a bit far-fetched, But this is not a serious consideration because the director, Lloyd Bacon, has carried off even the implausible with a surprising degree of authority. There is indeed a documentary quality about 'The Frogmen' that overshadows the routine hero-worshipping pattern of the script. ... With topnotch performances by all hands and action that is unusual, 'The Frogmen' rates a position close to the top of superior movies inspired by the innovations and heroics of World War II."

Critic Philip K. Scheuer of the Los Angeles Times wrote: "Watching 'The Frogmen' is like having your head shoved under water—and held there. You are apt to come up feeling even groggier than Lt. Comdr. Richard Widmark and the boys in his underwater demolition team ... [T]hough it is authenticated by the Navy and the Department of Defense the picture has the look of a science-fiction fantasy and its 'frogmen' that of things from another world."

== Awards ==
At the 24th Academy Awards, the film was nominated for Best Cinematography (Black-and-White) for Norbert Brodine and Best Screenplay (Motion Picture Story) for Oscar Millard. However, the award for cinematography was won by A Place in the Sun (William C. Mellor) while the story award was won by Seven Days to Noon (Paul Dehn and James Bernard).

== See also ==
- List of films featuring the United States Navy SEALs

== Sources ==
- Farber, Manny. 2009. Farber on Film: The Complete Film Writings of Manny Farber. Edited by Robert Polito. Library of America. ISBN 978-1-59853-050-6
