= Uncensored (film) =

- Theatrical release poster
- Directed by: Anthony Asquith
- Written by: Rodney Ackland; Terence Rattigan; Wolfgang Wilhelm
- Based on: Uncensored by Oscar Millard
- Produced by: Edward Black; Maurice Ostrer
- Starring: Eric Portman; Phyllis Calvert; Griffith Jones
- Cinematography: Arthur Crabtree
- Edited by: R. E. Dearing
- Music by: Louis Levy; Hans May
- Production company: Gainsborough Pictures
- Distributed by: General Film Distributors
- Release date: 24 August 1942
- Running time: 108 minutes
- Country: United Kingdom
- Language: English

Uncensored (also known as We Shall Rise Again) is a 1942 British war drama film directed by Anthony Asquith starring Eric Portman, Phyllis Calvert and Griffith Jones. It was written by Rodney Ackland, Wolfgang Wilhelm and Terence Rattigan based on the 1937 novel of the same title by Oscar Millard.

Uncensored is set in occupied Belgium and shares the propagandistic tone of many British films of its era. While its reception was mainly positive, it was criticised in some quarters for its unrealistic portrayal of the occupying German forces as bungling, incompetent and easily outwitted buffoons.

== Plot ==
Before the Nazi occupation of Belgium, Brussels nightclub owner André Delange used to publish an anti-Nazi newspaper called La Libre Belgique (Free Belgium) which was distributed secretly. In the aftermath of the German occupation, his underground colleagues in the Belgian resistance suggest reviving the newspaper, to which Delange agrees. With the help of his chief assistant Julie Lanvin and a small band of helpers, La Libre Belgique once more begins to circulate. When the Germans find out of its existence, they offer a reward to anyone who is prepared to identify those responsible for its publication.

Delange's business partner Charles Neels, disgruntled with their business relationship and jealous of Delange's relationship with the attractive Julie, betrays the whereabouts of the newspaper's makeshift office. The premises are raided and those present in the building arrested, but Delange and Julie manage to avoid capture. The Germans announce to the populace that La Libre Belgique is no more and its perpetrators are in custody; however Delange and Julie succeed in printing and distributing another edition, making the Germans look foolish and leading them to assume that the information given to them by their informant was false. They release those arrested, who they now believe not to be the people they were looking for, and vow to continue searching for the real culprits. Meanwhile the group led by Delange comes together again, and their work continues.

== Cast ==
- Eric Portman as André Delange
- Phyllis Calvert as Julie Lanvin
- Griffith Jones as Father de Gruyte
- Raymond Lovell as von Koerner
- Peter Glenville as Charles Neels
- Irene Handl as Frau von Koerner
- Felix Aylmer as Col. von Hohenstein
- Eliot Makeham as Abbé de Moor
- John Slater as Théophile
- Aubrey Mallalieu as Louis Backer
- Frederick Culley as Victor Lanvin
- Carl Jaffe as Kohlmeier
- Walter Hudd as van Heemskirk
- J.H. Roberts as Father Corot
- Peter Godfrey as Lou
- Ben Williams as Arthur Backer

== Production ==
The film was produced at Gainsborough Pictures by Edward Black, with cinematography from Arthur Crabtree. The film was shot at the company's Lime Grove Studios in Shepherd's Bush, with sets designed by the art director Alex Vetchinsky.

== Release ==
On its original UK release Uncensored ran for 108 minutes; for overseas distribution, however, it was trimmed to 83 minutes and the cut version subsequently became more widely circulated.

== Reception ==
The Monthly Film Bulletin wrote: "This story is dramatic enough and in essence is true and should have made a magnificent film. The direction, however, lacks the touch necessary and the production is dim. Even the very excellent cast seem lethargic with the exception of Peter Glenville, whose remarkable performance as the blindly, hysterically jealous Charles seems by comparison to be overdone. ... If only for its theme, this film should be seen."

Kine Weekly wrote: "The staging is technically effective, and both the acting and direction are tremendously sincere, but the play as a whole fails to escape from an atmosphere of theatrical artificiality. The patriots are a little too gentlemanly and the Nazis a little too ingenuous. Nevertheless, its heart is in the right place, even if sustained punch is lacking."

Variety wrote: "Efforts of the Belgian underground to thwart the Nazi grip form the basis for this thrilling melodrama, which often reaches the melodramatic heights of 39 Steps. ... Portman, slightly reminiscent of Cary Grant, contributes a standout performance."
