= Opinion polling for the 2029 Belgian elections =

Various organisations continually conduct opinion polls to gauge voter intention in anticipation of the next Belgian federal and regional elections. The elections are expected to take place on the same day in 2029. The results of nationwide polls are usually numerically split into the three Belgian regions: Flanders, Brussels and Wallonia. Federal seat projections for the Chamber of Representatives are presented together under these regional polls

== Federal election ==
This section includes opinion polls that do not explicitly concern the federal election, since the federal election are expected to take place on the same day as the regional elections.

=== Flanders ===
The table below shows the results for the opinion polls conducted in the Flemish Region, as well as for polls conducted nationwide the part of the results related to the Flemish Region.

Date(s) conducted	Pollster	Client	Sample size	N-VA	VB	Vooruit	CD&V	Anders	PVDA	Groen	Others	Lead
8–15 Sep 2026	Ipsos	Le Soir, RTL TVI, Het Laatste Nieuws, VTM	1,000	23.0%	27.8%	12.9%	13.3%	6.1%	10.0%	6.2%	0.7%	4.8
1–9 Jun 2026	Ipsos	Le Soir, RTL TVI, Het Laatste Nieuws, VTM	1,001	22.3%	26.6%	12.9%	12.6%	6.9%	10.1%	7.0%	1.6%	4.3
9 Mar – 5 Apr 2026	ULB, UAntwerp	RTBF, VRT, de Standaard	2,145	27.7%	20.8%	12.9%	12.2%	6.9%	10.6%	7.3%	1.5%	6.9
2–9 Mar 2026	Ipsos	Le Soir, RTL TVI, Het Laatste Nieuws, VTM	1,001	25.5%	25.4%	12.8%	12.6%	5.6%	9.8%	7.7%	0.6%	0.1
19 Jan 2026	Open VLD changes its name to Anders											
1–9 Dec 2025	Ipsos	Le Soir, RTL TVI, Het Laatste Nieuws, VTM	1,000	25.6%	23.9%	11.4%	13.9%	7.1%	10.2%	7.0%	0.9%	1.7
16–23 Sep 2025	Ipsos	Le Soir, RTL TVI, Het Laatste Nieuws, VTM	1,000	23.4%	26.7%	13.6%	13.4%	5.7%	9.1%	7.3%	0.8%	3.3
27 May – 3 Jun 2025	Ipsos	Le Soir, RTL TVI, Het Laatste Nieuws, VTM	1,000	26.3%	22.8%	13.4%	14.5%	6.1%	8.9%	7.4%	0.6%	3.5
23 May 2025	ULB, UAntwerp	VRT, de Standaard, RTBF	2,278	26.6%	20.6%	14.8%	13.7%	5.7%	8.9%	7.3%	2.1%	6.0
4–11 Mar 2025	Ipsos	Le Soir, RTL TVI, Het Laatste Nieuws, VTM	1,000	25.5%	25.7%	14.3%	11.7%	6.0%	10.0%	6.6%	0.2%	0.2
18–21 Nov 2024	Ipsos	Le Soir, RTL TVI, Het Laatste Nieuws, VTM	1,000	24.6%	23.5%	15.5%	13.3%	7.2%	7.9%	6.9%	1.1%	1.1
11–17 Sep 2024	Ipsos	Le Soir, RTL TVI, Het Laatste Nieuws, VTM	1,000	26.7%	23.2%	14.8%	11.3%	6.8%	8.9%	6.5%	1.8%	3.5
2024 federal election				25.56%	21.81%	13.02%	12.81%	8.75%	8.16%	7.46%	2.43%	3.75
2024 Flemish regional election				23.88%	22.66%	13.85%	13.04%	8.33%	8.31%	7.29%	2.64%	1.22

=== Wallonia ===
The table below shows the results for the opinion polls conducted in the Walloon Region, as well as for polls conducted nationwide the part of the results related to the Walloon Region.

Date(s) conducted	Pollster	Client	Sample size	MR	PS	LE	PTB	Eco	DéFI	Others	Lead
8–15 Sep 2026	Ipsos	Le Soir, RTL TVI, Het Laatste Nieuws, VTM	1,000	20.3%	29.0%	17.6%	18.9%	8.9%	–	5.3%	8.7
1–9 Jun 2026	Ipsos	Le Soir, RTL TVI, Het Laatste Nieuws, VTM	1,002	20.1%	29.0%	20.2%	16.8%	8.1%	–	5.8%	8.8
9 Mar – 5 Apr 2026	ULB, UAntwerp	RTBF, VRT, de Standaard	2,126	20.0%	24.9%	19.3%	18.6%	6.8%	–	10.4%	4.9
2–9 Mar 2026	Ipsos	Le Soir, RTL TVI, Het Laatste Nieuws, VTM	1,001	21.0%	27.9%	19.4%	17.0%	7.9%	–	6.8%	6.9
1–9 Dec 2025	Ipsos	Le Soir, RTL TVI, Het Laatste Nieuws, VTM	1,002	21.4%	29.0%	17.3%	19.6%	7.4%	–	5.3%	7.6
16–23 Sep 2025	Ipsos	Le Soir, RTL TVI, Het Laatste Nieuws, VTM	1,000	23.9%	26.2%	18.2%	18.4%	7.7%	–	5.6%	2.3
27 May – 3 Jun 2025	Ipsos	Le Soir, RTL TVI, Het Laatste Nieuws, VTM	1,000	24.0%	25.5%	19.2%	16.8%	8.6%	3.2%	2.7%	1.5
23 May 2025	ULB, UAntwerp	VRT, de Standaard, RTBF	2,064	22.8%	24.0%	20.3%	17.1%	7.1%	–	8.7%	1.2
24 Apr 2025	lib.res is founded										
4–11 Mar 2025	Ipsos	Le Soir, RTL TVI, Het Laatste Nieuws, VTM	1,000	24.8%	25.8%	18.5%	17.4%	7.8%	–	5.7%	1.0
18–21 Nov 2024	Ipsos	Le Soir, RTL TVI, Het Laatste Nieuws, VTM	1,000	27.4%	24.6%	20.6%	12.9%	8.1%	–	6.4%	2.8
11–17 Sep 2024	Ipsos	Le Soir, RTL TVI, Het Laatste Nieuws, VTM	1,000	26.6%	21.7%	22.6%	13.1%	8.1%	–	7.9%	4.0
2024 federal election				28.21%	21.98%	20.01%	11.64%	6.89%	2.36%	8.91%	6.23
2024 Walloon regional election				29.58%	23.20%	20.65%	12.09%	6.97%	2.69%	4.82%	6.38

=== Brussels ===
The table below shows polling results in the Brussels Region.

Date(s) conducted	Pollster	Client	Sample size	MR	PS	PTB	Eco	LE	DéFI	Grn	TFA	N-VA	And	VB	Vrt	PVDA	CD&V	Others	Lead
8–15 Sep 2026	Ipsos	Le Soir, RTL TVI, Het Laatste Nieuws, VTM	600	15.5%	20.3%	21.4%	9.9%	9.5%	5.2%	3.4%	1.3%	4.8%	0.2%	3.4%	1.9%	1.8%	0.0%	1.4%	1.1
1–9 Jun 2026	Ipsos	Le Soir, RTL TVI, Het Laatste Nieuws, VTM	602	13.9%	18.3%	24.8%	8.9%	9.4%	6.0%	2.8%	1.9%	5.1%	1.2%	3.0%	1.1%	1.5%	0.4%	1.7%	6.5
9 Mar – 5 Apr 2026	ULB, UAntwerp	RTBF, VRT, de Standaard	1,083	14.2%	15.9%	24.4%	6.5%	11.4%	7.3%	4.2%	–	4.6%	1.1%	1.6%	3.0%	–	1.5%	4.1%	8.5
2–9 Mar 2026	Ipsos	Le Soir, RTL TVI, Het Laatste Nieuws, VTM	600	16.4%	18.4%	25.5%	7.1%	11.7%	4.5%	2.0%	0.9%	3.7%	0.9%	2.9%	1.4%	1.0%	1.5%	2.1%	7.1
19 Jan 2026	Open VLD changes its name to Anders																		
1–9 Dec 2025	Ipsos	Le Soir, RTL TVI, Het Laatste Nieuws, VTM	600	17.2%	19.8%	22.3%	7.4%	9.0%	5.6%	2.8%	2.3%	3.2%	1.0%	5.1%	1.1%	0.6%	1.3%	1.3%	2.5
16–23 Sep 2025	Ipsos	Le Soir, RTL TVI, Het Laatste Nieuws, VTM	600	16.9%	20.3%	20.6%	9.5%	9.7%	3.8%	2.9%	0.6%	3.2%	1.1%	4.3%	2.8%	1.0%	0.8%	2.5%	0.3
27 May – 3 Jun 2025	Ipsos	Le Soir, RTL TVI, Het Laatste Nieuws, VTM	600	21.4%	21.7%	17.4%	7.4%	9.2%	3.2%	2.4%	2.5%	3.2%	1.7%	3.8%	2.1%	1.3%	0.5%	2.2%	0.3
23 May 2025	ULB, UAntwerp	VRT, de Standaard, RTBF	1,542	21.4%	17.8%	19.0%	8.3%	9.1%	4.3%	3.7%	–	4.4%	1.5%	2.6%	1.9%	–	2.1%	4.0%	2.4
24 Apr 2025	lib.res is founded																		
4–11 Mar 2025	Ipsos	Le Soir, RTL TVI, Het Laatste Nieuws, VTM	600	21.8%	20.1%	17.1%	9.0%	9.7%	6.9%	1.6%	1.3%	–	1.3%	–	1.4%	1.1%	0.5%	8.2%	1.7
18–21 Nov 2024	Ipsos	Le Soir, RTL TVI, Het Laatste Nieuws, VTM	591	20.0%	20.2%	19.7%	11.2%	6.5%	5.7%	2.3%	2.5%	3.2%	0.7%	1.6%	2.9%	1.2%	0.8%	1.5%	0.2
11–17 Sep 2024	Ipsos	Le Soir, RTL TVI, Het Laatste Nieuws, VTM	600	22.6%	20.4%	15.4%	9.8%	8.4%	6.2%	2.0%	2.0%	2.0%	1.5%	2.7%	1.4%	1.8%	1.5%	2.3%	2.2
2024 federal election				23.15%	18.60%	16.75%	11.30%	9.52%	6.58%	–	4.78%	2.79%	–	2.46%	–	–	–	4.07%	4.55
2024 Brussels regional election				25.95%	22.05%	20.92%	9.85%	10.68%	5.70%	–	–	–	–	–	–	–	–	4.85%	3.90

=== Seat projections ===
The table below shows seat projections for the Chamber of Representatives according to a reporting newspaper or polling firm.

76 seats needed for a majority
Date(s) conducted	Pollster	Client	N-VA	VB	MR	PS	PVDA/ PTB	LE	Vrt	CD&V	And	Grn	Eco	DéFI	Others	Lead	Maj.	Opp.	Lead
8–15 Sep 2026	Ipsos	Le Soir, RTL TVI, Het Laatste Nieuws, VTM	22	26	13	19	23	11	12	12	3	4	4	1	0	3	70	80	10
1–9 Jun 2026	Ipsos	Le Soir, RTL TVI, Het Laatste Nieuws, VTM	22	26	12	19	20	14	12	10	4	6	4	1	0	4	70	80	10
9 Mar – 5 Apr 2026	ULB, UAntwerp	RTBF, VRT, de Standaard	27	20	14	18	23	12	12	10	4	6	3	1	0	4	75	75	0
2–9 Mar 2026	Ipsos	Le Soir, RTL TVI, Het Laatste Nieuws, VTM	25	24	13	20	23	11	12	10	2	6	4	0	0	1	71	79	8
19 Jan 2026	Open VLD changes its name to Anders																		
1–9 Dec 2025	Ipsos	Le Soir, RTL TVI, Het Laatste Nieuws, VTM	26	24	13	19	22	11	9	12	4	5	4	1	0	2	71	79	8
16–23 Sep 2025	Ipsos	Le Soir, RTL TVI, Het Laatste Nieuws, VTM	22	25	16	19	20	11	13	12	2	6	4	0	0	3	74	76	2
27 May – 3 Jun 2025	Ipsos	Le Soir, RTL TVI, Het Laatste Nieuws, VTM	25	21	16	19	19	10	13	13	4	5	5	0	0	4	77	73	4
23 May 2025	ULB, UAntwerp	VRT, de Standaard, RTBF	26	18	18	16	17	13	14	12	4	6	5	1	0	8	83	67	16
24 Apr 2025	lib.res is founded																		
4–11 Mar 2025	Ipsos	Le Soir, RTL TVI, Het Laatste Nieuws, VTM	25	–	16	–	–	11	13	10	4	–	–	–	–	–	75	75	0
18–21 Nov 2024	Ipsos	Le Soir, RTL TVI, Het Laatste Nieuws, VTM	24	23	16	17	16	14	14	11	5	5	4	1	0	1	79	71	8
11–17 Sep 2024	Ipsos	Le Soir, RTL TVI, Het Laatste Nieuws, VTM	26	23	17	15	17	15	13	10	5	4	4	1	0	3	81	69	12
2024 federal election			24	20	19	16	15	14	13	11	8	7	2	1	0	4	81	69	12

== See also ==
- Opinion polling for the 2024 Belgian elections
