= Death on the Board =

1937 novel

- First edition (UK)
- Author: John Rhode
- Language: English
- Series: Lancelot Priestley
- Genre: Detective
- Publisher: Collins (UK); Dodd Mead (US)
- Publication date: 1937
- Publication place: United Kingdom
- Media type: Print
- Preceded by: Death in the Hopfields
- Followed by: Proceed with Caution

Death on the Board is a 1937 detective novel by John Rhode, the pen name of the British writer Cecil Street. It is the twenty sixth in his long-running series of novels featuring Lancelot Priestley, a Golden Age armchair detective. It was published in the United States by Dodd Mead under the slightly altered title Death Sits on the Board.

Isaac Anderson in The New York Times considered "The reader may not have much difficulty in spotting the murderer, but he will not find it so easy to figure out the hows and whys of the case. The murders are most ingeniously planned and executed, and even Dr. Priestley is put to a severe test before the story is ended. This is easily the best of the recent Dr. Priestley mysteries."

== Synopsis ==
At his residence in Beckenham in Kent on the outskirts of London, Sir Andrew Wiggenhall the chairman of the board of directors of a large firm of ironmongers is killed by an explosion that largely wrecks the house. Investigating officer Superintendent Hanslet is not convinced his death was an accident, particularly when another member of the firm's board is found dead. With the help of Priestley he sets out to solve the mysterious incidents that have left the remaining members of the board.

== Bibliography ==
- Evans, Curtis. Masters of the "Humdrum" Mystery: Cecil John Charles Street, Freeman Wills Crofts, Alfred Walter Stewart and the British Detective Novel, 1920-1961. McFarland, 2014.
- Herbert, Rosemary. Whodunit?: A Who's Who in Crime & Mystery Writing. Oxford University Press, 2003.
- Reilly, John M. Twentieth Century Crime & Mystery Writers. Springer, 2015.
