= Murder in Crown Passage =

1937 novel

- First edition (UK)
- Author: Cecil Street
- Language: English
- Series: Desmond Merrion
- Genre: Detective
- Publisher: Collins (UK); Doubleday (US)
- Publication date: 1937
- Publication place: United Kingdom
- Media type: Print
- Preceded by: Death at the Club
- Followed by: Death at Low Tide

Murder in Crown Passage is a 1937 detective novel by the British writer Cecil Street, writing under the pen name of Miles Burton. It is the sixteenth in a series of books featuring the amateur detective Desmond Merrion and Inspector Arnold of Scotland Yard. Street was one of the most prolific authors of the Golden Age of Detective Fiction. It was published in the United States by Doubleday the same year under the alternative title The Man with the Tattooed Face. As often in the series, the setting is in rural England.

== Synopsis ==
The small country town of Faston Bishop is rocked when a body is discovered in Crown Passage just off the High Street. The man is a casual labourer recently arrived in the area, but nobody has any idea why anyone should want to murder him. Arnold is called in to investigate and soon seeks the assistance of his fried Merrion. Arnold's attempts to pin the crime on a local couple of shopkeepers, is challenged by Merrion who believes it has its roots miles away in London's Docklands.

== Bibliography ==
- Evans, Curtis. Masters of the "Humdrum" Mystery: Cecil John Charles Street, Freeman Wills Crofts, Alfred Walter Stewart and the British Detective Novel, 1920-1961. McFarland, 2014.
- Magill, Frank Northen . Critical Survey of Mystery and Detective Fiction: Authors, Volume 3. Salem Press, 1988.
- Reilly, John M. Twentieth Century Crime & Mystery Writers. Springer, 2015.
