= Death in the Hopfields =

1937 novel

- First edition
- Author: John Rhode
- Language: English
- Series: Lancelot Priestley
- Genre: Detective
- Publisher: Collins (UK); Dodd Mead (US)
- Publication date: 1937
- Publication place: United Kingdom
- Media type: Print
- Preceded by: In Face of the Verdict
- Followed by: Death on the Board

Death in the Hopfields is a 1937 detective novel by John Rhode, the pen name of the British writer Cecil Street. It is the 25th in his long-running series of novels featuring Lancelot Priestley, a Golden Age armchair detective. It was published in America by Dodd Mead under the alternative title The Harvest Murder.

Caldwell Harpur gave the novel a broadly positive review in the Times Literary Supplement but felt that the murder mystery was so simple that there had really been no need for the local police to need assistance to crack the case.

== Synopsis ==
The novel takes place in rural Kent during the hop-picking season. A burglary takes place and the complex circumstances surrounding it led to Sergeant Wragge of the local force calling in Scotland Yard. It is only through the deductions of Priestley, however, that it is realised that his is a case of murder.

== Bibliography ==
- Evans, Curtis. Masters of the "Humdrum" Mystery: Cecil John Charles Street, Freeman Wills Crofts, Alfred Walter Stewart and the British Detective Novel, 1920–1961. McFarland, 2014.
- Herbert, Rosemary. Whodunit?: A Who's Who in Crime & Mystery Writing. Oxford University Press, 2003.
- Reilly, John M. Twentieth Century Crime & Mystery Writers. Springer, 2015.
