= To Quito and Back =

To Quito and Back is a 1937 American play by Ben Hecht. It was neither a commercial nor a critical success. Mounted by the Theatre Guild, it premiered at the Colonial Theatre in Boston on September 20, 1937. It transferred to Broadway's Guild Theatre where it opened on October 6, 1937. The cast was led by Leslie Banks as Alexander Sterns, Francis Compton as Howard Evans, and Sylvia Sidney as Lola Hobbs.

== Premise ==
An American writer from New York finds himself in Ecuador in the company of a young woman, and unexpectedly befriended by Zamiano, the leader of the revolt.
