= Opinion polling for the 2019 Belgian federal election =

In the run up to the 2019 Belgian federal election, various organisations carry out opinion polling to gauge voting intention in Belgium. Results of such polls are displayed in this article.

The date range for these opinion polls are from the previous federal election, held on 25 May 2014, to the present day. The results of the opinion polls conducted on a nationwide basis are usually split into separate numbers for the three Belgian regions. They are therefore split across the tables in the sections below, but seat projections for the Belgian Chamber are presented together.

== Flanders ==
The graph and the table below show the results for the opinion polls conducted in the Flemish Region, and for polls conducted nationwide the part of the results related to the Flemish Region.

Summary of poll results given below from the election result 25 May 2014. Lines give the mean estimated by a LOESS smoother (smoothing set to span = 0.5).

Date(s) conducted	Polling firm	Newspaper	Sample size	N-VA	Vlaams Belang	CD&V	Open Vld	sp.a	Groen	PVDA	Others	Lead	Gov.	Opp.	Lead
26 May 2019	2019 federal election			24.8%	18.5%	15.4%	13.1%	10.4%	10.1%	5.3%	2.4%	6.3%	28.5%	69.1%	40.6%
6–14 May 2019	Ipsos	RTL TVi / Le Soir / VTM / Het Laatste Nieuws	1,003	28.1%	14.8%	17.1%	11.2%	11%	12.1%	4.7%	1%	11.0%	28.3%	71.7%	43.4%
25 Mar–14 Apr 2019	Kantar	VRT / De Standaard / RTBF / La Libre	1,006	27.9%	9.3%	14.7%	14.2%	12.7%	14.6%	5.9%	0.8%	13.2%	28.9%	71.1%	42.2%
5–11 Feb 2019	Ipsos	RTL TVi / Le Soir / VTM / Het Laatste Nieuws	996	27.4%	11.1%	15%	12.7%	11%	15.6%	4.9%	2.3%	11.8%	27.7%	72.3%	44.6%
13–17 Dec 2018	Ipsos	Het Nieuwsblad	1,000	30.2%	12%	15.7%	11.6%	9.7%	13.8%	5.5%	1.5%	14.5%	27.3%	72.7%	45.4%
9 Dec 2018	N-VA quit the government; the other three parties continue as a minority government. The crisis is due to divergent positions on the Global Compact for Migration.														
19 Nov–8 Dec 2018	TNS	La Libre / RTBF / VRT / De Standaard	1,038	28.3%	7.6%	18.7%	17.5%	9.2%	16%	2.5%	0.1%	9.6%	64.5%	35.5%	29%
27 Nov–3 Dec 2018	Ipsos	RTL TVi / Le Soir / VTM / Het Laatste Nieuws	998	28.0%	11.7%	14.6%	13.4%	12.3%	12.2%	6.2%	1.6%	13.4%	56.0%	42.4%	13.6%
14 Oct 2018	Provincial elections			24.8%	13.0%	19.7%	13.7%	10.4%	13.2%	3.2%	2.1%	5.1%	58.2%	41.9%	16.3%
20–27 Sep 2018	Ipsos	RTL TVi / Le Soir / VTM / Het Laatste Nieuws	1,000	25.0%	11.3%	17.2%	12.8%	12.1%	14.1%	4.4%	3.1%	7.8%	55%	41.9%	13.1%
29 May–6 June 2018	Ipsos	RTL TVi / Le Soir / VTM / Het Laatste Nieuws	1,000	26.5%	9.7%	15.3%	13.9%	11.7%	12.4%	6.2%	4.3%	11.2%	55.7%	40%	15.7%
26 Feb–17 Mar 2018	TNS Kantar	RTBF / VRT / De Standaard / La Libre	1,003	32.4%	7.5%	16.4%	14.7%	9.5%	13.8%	4.9%	1.0%	16.0%	63.5%	35.5%	28.0%
27 Feb–6 Mar 2018	Ipsos	RTL TVi / Le Soir / VTM / Het Laatste Nieuws	965	31.5%	9.0%	15.1%	12.7%	13.0%	10.4%	6.0%	2.5%	16.4%	59.1%	38.4%	20.7%
27 Nov–4 Dec 2017	Ipsos	RTL TVi / Le Soir / VTM / Het Laatste Nieuws	995	29.5%	10.4%	14.1%	12.2%	10.9%	13.2%	5.5%	4.2%	15.4%	55.8%	40.0%	15.8%
11 Sep–8 Oct 2017	TNS Kantar	La Libre / RTBF / VRT / De Standaard	1,045	28.0%	6.5%	19.4%	15.5%	11.0%	13.9%	5.1%	0.6%	8.6%	62.9%	36.5%	26.4%
25 August–3 Sep 2017	Ipsos	RTL TVi / Le Soir / VTM / Het Laatste Nieuws	959	30.2%	7.9%	16.1%	12.1%	12.2%	13.4%	5.0%	—	14.1%	58.4%	38.5%	19.9%
23–27 June 2017	Dedicated	L'Echo	—	27.1%	11.7%	16.9%	12.7%	9.5%	12.5%	7.3%	0.7%	10.2%	56.7%	33.7%	23.0%
27 Mar–11 Apr 2017	TNS Media	VRT / De Standaard	1,030	26.3%	7.8%	18.6%	14.4%	13.2%	14.7%	4.2%	0.7%	7.7%	59.3%	39.9%	19.4%
16–20 Mar 2017	Dedicated	RTBf / La Libre Belgique	1,038	28.3%	11.9%	14.1%	13.6%	12.9%	11.5%	5.5%	2.2%	14.2%	56.0%	41.8%	14.2%
10–17 Jan 2017	Ipsos	RTL TVi / Le Soir / VTM / Het Laatste Nieuws	964	27.4%	10.3%	14.9%	12.9%	13.2%	12.2%	5.4%	—	12.5%	55.2%	41.1%	14.1%
24–28 Nov 2016	Dedicated	RTBf / La Libre Belgique	1,007	26.3%	12.3%	16.3%	12.4%	13.2%	12.7%	4.2%	—	10.0%	55.0%	42.4%	12.6%
14 Sep–3 Oct 2016	TNS Media	VRT / De Standaard	1,013	27.8%	8.1%	16.8%	13.6%	15.8%	13.3%	3.4%	1.2%	11%	58.2%	40.6%	17.6%
19–25 Sep 2016	Ipsos	RTL TVi / Le Soir / VTM / Het Laatste Nieuws	983	25.9%	12.0%	17.6%	12.5%	13.7%	10.7%	3.9%	—	8.3%	56.0%	40.3%	15.7%
2–6 Sep 2016	Dedicated	RTBf / La Libre Belgique	1,002	25.2%	13.1%	15.6%	14.0%	14.9%	10.0%	5.1%	2.1%	9.6%	54.8%	43.1%	11.7%
6–12 May 2016	Ipsos	RTL TVi / Le Soir / VTM / Het Laatste Nieuws	1,045	24.2%	13.9%	13.8%	13.2%	15.6%	11.1%	4.8%	—	8.6%	51.2%	45.4%	5.8%
31 Mar–4 Apr 2016	Dedicated	RTBf / La Libre Belgique	975	25.6%	12.4%	18.3%	13.3%	14.4%	10.2%	—	—	7.3%	57.2%	37.0%	20.2%
22 Feb–9 Mar 2016	TNS Media	VRT / De Standaard	1,005	27.3%	8.1%	19.1%	14.1%	14.7%	11.6%	4.0%	—	8.2%	60.5%	38.4%	22.1%
15–20 Jan 2016	Ipsos	RTL TVi / Le Soir / VTM / Het Laatste Nieuws	1,043	28.5%	11.6%	16.0%	12.5%	15.2%	10.3%	3.7%	—	12.5%	57.0%	40.8%	16.2%
3–7 Dec 2015	Dedicated	RTBf / La Libre Belgique	990	29.2%	11.9%	15.0%	12.6%	14.1%	11.6%	—	—	14.2%	56.8%	37.6%	19.2%
28 Sep–4 Oct 2015	Ipsos	RTL TVi / Le Soir / VTM / Het Laatste Nieuws	1,030	28.8%	10.5%	17.8%	12.5%	14.5%	9.0%	4.1%	—	11.0%	59.1%	38.1%	21%
22 Sep–2 Oct 2015	TNS Media	VRT / De Standaard	1,019	31.1%	7.0%	18.4%	14.9%	13.8%	9.9%	3.8%	—	12.7%	64.4%	34.5%	29.9%
9–14 Sep 2015	Dedicated	RTBf / La Libre Belgique	745	27.5%	9.7%	16.0%	14.4%	16.2%	10.1%	3.8%	—	11.3%	57.9%	39.8%	18.1%
12–18 May 2015	Dedicated	RTBf / La Libre Belgique	761	28.1%	7.9%	17.2%	15.4%	15.6%	10.0%	3.3%	—	10.9%	60.7%	36.8%	23.9%
20 Apr–3 May 2015	TNS Media	VRT / De Standaard	1,032	28.5%	5.8%	21.2%	16.1%	14.3%	11.6%	1.4%	—	7.3%	65.8%	33.1%	32.7%
20–24 Apr 2015	Ipsos	RTL TVi / Le Soir / VTM / Het Laatste Nieuws	963	28.3%	8.0%	15.8%	14.0%	15.6%	10.7%	3.2%	—	12.5%	58.1%	37.5%	20.6%
5–9 Mar 2015	Dedicated	RTBF / La Libre Belgique	691	28.8%	7.4%	16.7%	15.4%	16.4%	9.6%	3.4%	2.3%	12.1%	60.9%	36.8%	24.1%
23–28 Jan 2015	Ipsos	RTL TVi / Le Soir / VTM / Het Laatste Nieuws	1,035	30.2%	7.6%	17.1%	14.9%	14.7%	10.2%	3.6%	—	13.1%	62.2%	36.1%	26.1%
5–11 Jan 2015	Ipsos	RTL TVi / Le Soir / VTM / Het Laatste Nieuws	1,043	27.8%	6.8%	18.3%	14.3%	15.7%	10.4%	3.8%	—	9.5%	60.4%	36.7%	23.7%
4–5 Dec 2014	AQ Rate	Het Laatste Nieuws	794	28%	6%	17%	12%	16%	14%	2%	—	11%	57%	38%	19%
27 Nov–1 Dec 2014	Dedicated	RTBF / La Libre Belgique	773	30.9%	5.7%	18.2%	13.3%	15.2%	10.2%	4.0%	2.5%	12.7%	62.4%	35.1%	27.3%
9–10 Oct 2014	AQ Rate	Het Laatste Nieuws	801	30%	8%	14%	16%	18%	9%	3%	—	12%	60%	38%	22%
22 Sep–3 Oct 2014	TNS Media	De Standaard / VRT	1,023	29.9%	6.5%	20.0%	14.4%	15.7%	9.8%	3.2%	—	9.9%	64.3%	35.2%	29.1%
5–9 Sep 2014	Dedicated	RTBF / La Libre Belgique	792	31.9%	5.5%	17.7%	15.4%	15.0%	9.6%	3.1%	1.8%	14.2%	65.0%	33.2%	31.8%
July 2014	AQ Rate	Het Laatste Nieuws	880	32.9%	5.8%	17.7%	15.4%	14.6%	9.0%	3.1%	—	15.2%	66.0%	32.5%	33.5%
June 2014	AQ Rate	Het Laatste Nieuws	Unknown	38.4%	5.2%	15.5%	13.8%	13.1%	7.8%	3.3%	—	22.9%	67.7%	29.4%	38.3%
25 May 2014	Federal election			32.4%	5.8%	18.6%	15.5%	14.0%	8.6%	2.8%	2.2%	13.9%	66.5%	31.2%	35.3%

== Wallonia ==
The graph and the table below show the results for the opinion polls conducted in the Walloon Region, and for polls conducted nationwide the part of the results related to the Walloon Region.

Summary of poll results given below from the election result 25 May 2014. Lines give the mean estimated by a LOESS smoother (smoothing set to span = 0.5).

Date(s) conducted	Polling firm	Newspaper	Sample size	PS	MR	Ecolo	PTB	cdH	DéFI	PP	DC	Others	Lead	Gov.	Opp.	Lead
26 May 2019	2019 federal election			26.2%	21.4%	14.5%	13.7%	11.0%	4.1%	3.7%	?	5.1%	4.8%	21.4%	73.5%	52.1%
6–14 May 2019	Ipsos	RTL TVi / Le Soir / VTM / Het Laatste Nieuws	1,000	28.5%	22.7%	19.1%	9.2%	9.7%	3.9%	3.5%	?	4.4%	5.8%	22.7%	77.3%	54.6%
26 Apr - 30 Apr 2019	Dedicated	Le Soir	1,611	26.9%	20.7%	16.3%	13.9%	8.6%	4.3%	4.9%	?	4.4% (Note: Including 2.1% for Alain Destexhe's list.)	6.2%	20.7%	79.3%	58.6%
25 Mar - 14 Apr 2019	TNS Kantar	RTBF / VRT / De Standaard / La Libre	1,004	24.7%	18.3%	22.0%	14.8%	9.3%	3.9%	3.5%	?	3.5% (Note: Including 1.1% for Alain Destexhe's list.)	2.7%	18.3%	81.7%	63.4%
5 February-11 Feb 2019	Ipsos	RTL TVi / Le Soir / VTM / Het Laatste Nieuws	995	24.3%	19.4%	16.8%	10.7%	10.8%	4.3%	5.4%	1.6%	6.7%	4.9%	19.4%	80.6%	61.2%
9 Dec 2018	N-VA quit the government; the other three parties continue as a minority government. The crisis is due to divergent positions on the Global Compact for Migration.															
19 November–8 Dec 2018	TNS	La Libre / RTBF / VRT / De Standaard	1,016	25.4%	19.9%	19.7%	14.0%	10.4%	3.3%	5.1%	?	2.2%	5.5%	19.9%	77.9%	58.0%
27 November-3 Dec 2018	Ipsos	RTL TVi / Le Soir / VTM / Het Laatste Nieuws	1,003	24.9%	20.7%	13.5%	13.1%	11.3%	4.2%	6.2%	2.3%	3.8%	4.2%	20.7%	75.5%	54.8%
14 Oct 2018	Provincial elections			25.4%	23.7%	16.2%	10.0%	12.8%	4.6%	3.1%	?	4.2%	1.7%	23.7%	72.1%	48.4%
20–27 Sep 2018	Ipsos	RTL TVi / Le Soir / VTM / Het Laatste Nieuws	1,000	23.6%	20.6%	10.9%	13.1%	10.1%	6.9%	6.7%	2.1%	6.0%	3%	20.6%	73.4%	52.8%
29 May–6 June 2018	Ipsos	RTL TVi / Le Soir / VTM / Het Laatste Nieuws	1,000	23.4%	20%	13.2%	12.8%	9%	5.9%	7.3%	2.1%	6.3%	3.4%	20%	71.6%	51.6%
26 February–17 Mar 2018	TNS Kantar	RTBF / VRT / De Standaard / La Libre	1,003	23.2%	24.1%	17.5%	10.6%	11.1%	5.6%	3.4%	1.0%	3.5%	0.9%	23.2%	71.4%	48.2%
27 February–6 March	Ipsos	RTL TVi / Le Soir / VTM / Het Laatste Nieuws	983	23.9%	21.2%	13.5%	17.3%	7.2%	6.5%	4.3%	1.1%	5.2%	2.7%	21.2%	73.6%	52.4%
27 November–3 Dec 2017	Ipsos	RTL TVi / Le Soir / VTM / Het Laatste Nieuws	999	19.5%	22.1%	11.0%	18.9%	8.3%	6.3%	3.9%	2.2%	7.2%	2.6%	22.1%	68.5%	46.4%
11 September–8 Oct 2017	TNS Kantar	La Libre / RTBF / VRT / De Standaard	1,076	21.5%	21.4%	18.5%	14.8%	8.7%	5.8%	0.7%	—	8.6%	0.1%	21.4%	70.0%	48.6%
25 August–3 Sep 2017	Ipsos	RTL TVi / Le Soir / VTM / Het Laatste Nieuws	960	20.7%	21.4%	12.7%	17.5%	8.7%	6.2%	4.5%	—		0.7%	21.4%	70.3%	48.9%
23–27 June 2017	Dedicated	L'Echo	625	16.0%	23.2%	11.4%	24.9%	9.8%	3.9%	2.6%	—	8.2%	1.7%	23.2%	66.0%	42.8%
16–20 Mar 2017	Dedicated	RTBf / La Libre Belgique	946	20.3%	22.7%	11.2%	20.5%	9.9%	3.0%	2.2%	—	10.2%	2.2%	22.7%	67.1%	44.4%
16–17 Feb 2017	iVox	Sudpresse	1,000	21.3%	20.7%	13.7%	17.4%	10.1%	4.5%	6.9%	—	5.5%	0.6%	20.7%	73.9%	53.2%
10–17 Jan 2017	Ipsos	RTL TVi / Le Soir / VTM / Het Laatste Nieuws	961	23.6%	19.4%	11.2%	16.3%	11.2%	2.8%	5.0%	—	3.6%	4.2%	19.4%	70.1%	50.7%
24–28 Nov 2016	Dedicated	RTBf / La Libre Belgique	892	25.4%	23.1%	9.2%	18.2%	9.4%	2.2%	4.0%	—		2.3%	23.1%	68.6%	45.5%
19–25 Sep 2016	Ipsos	RTL TVi / Le Soir / VTM / Het Laatste Nieuws	983	24.7%	22.3%	7.5%	16.3%	9.8%	2.4%	6.0%	—		2.4%	22.3%	66.7%	44.4%
2–6 Sep 2016	Dedicated	RTBf / La Libre Belgique	962	25.6%	23.5%	9.2%	14.6%	10.5%	3.9%	5.3%	—	7.4%	2.1%	23.5%	69.1%	45.6%
6–12 May 2016	Ipsos	RTL TVi / Le Soir / VTM / Het Laatste Nieuws	1,003	25.8%	20.1%	10.1%	13.5%	12.0%	3.3%	5.5%	—		5.7%	20.1%	70.2%	50.1%
31 March–4 Apr 2016	Dedicated	RTBF / La Libre Belgique	967	26.4%	23.9%	11.1%	10.4%	12.8%	2.4%	5.5%	—		2.5%	23.9%	68.6%	44.7%
15–20 Jan 2016	Ipsos	RTL TVi / Le Soir / VTM / Het Laatste Nieuws	1,034	26.7%	23.1%	9.2%	8.8%	11.1%	3.4%	5.2%	—		3.6%	23.1%	64.4%	41.3%
3–7 Dec 2015	Dedicated	RTBF / La Libre Belgique	910	27.2%	24.7%	9.5%	10.3%	13.5%	3.2%	5.4%	—		2.5%	24.7%	69.1%	44.4%
28 September–4 Oct 2015	Ipsos	RTL TVi / Le Soir / VTM / Het Laatste Nieuws	1,017	26.0%	23.3%	9.0%	8.5%	13.3%	1.7%	4.6%	—		2.7%	23.3%	63.1%	39.8%
9–14 Sep 2015	Dedicated	RTBf / La Libre Belgique	643	29.7%	24.2%	9.2%	9.7%	13.5%	2.6%	4.1%	—		3.5%	24.2%	68.8%	44.6%
12–18 May 2015	Dedicated	RTBf / La Libre Belgique	680	29.7%	25.5%	8.9%	9.0%	12.8%	2.9%	4.6%	—		4.2%	25.5%	67.9%	42.4%
20–24 Apr 2015	Ipsos	RTL TVi / Le Soir / VTM / Het Laatste Nieuws	952	25.8%	26.1%	9.1%	8.5%	13.1%	2.2%	5.0%	—		0.3%	26.1%	63.7%	37.6%
5–9 Mar 2015	Dedicated	RTBF / La Libre Belgique	678	28.7%	25.2%	8.3%	8.3%	14.3%	2.9%	3.5%	—	8.8%	3.5%	25.2%	66.0%	40.8%
23–28 Jan 2015	Ipsos	RTL TVi / Le Soir / VTM / Het Laatste Nieuws	1,042	27.4%	26.0%	8.4%	7.3%	13.9%	2.2%	4.7%	—		1.4%	26.0%	63.9%	37.9%
5–11 Jan 2015 ]	Ipsos	RTL TVi / Le Soir / VTM / Het Laatste Nieuws	1,053	30.1%	25.3%	7.8%	7.7%	12.6%	2.1%	3.5%	—		4.8%	25.3%	63.8%	38.5%
27 November–1 Dec 2014	Dedicated	RTBF / La Libre Belgique	655	30.1%	23.9%	8.1%	7.6%	13.4%	2.7%	4.9%	—		6.2%	23.9%	67.7%	43.8%
5–9 Sep 2014	Dedicated	RTBF / La Libre Belgique	676	31.0%	26.6%	8.5%	8.1%	12.7%	1.8%	5.0%	—	6.3%	4.4%	26.6%	67.1%	40.5%
25 May 2014	Federal election			32.0%	25.8%	8.2%	5.5%	14.0%	2.4%	4.5%	1.2%	6.4%	6.2%	25.8%	66.6%	40.8%

== Brussels ==
The table below shows the results for the opinion polls conducted in the Brussels Region, and for polls conducted nationwide the part of the results related to the Brussels Region.

Summary of poll results given below from the election result 25 May 2014. Lines give the mean estimated by a LOESS smoother (smoothing set to span = 0.5).

Date(s) conducted	Polling firm	Publisher	Sample size	Ecolo	PS	MR	PTB- PVDA	DéFI	cdH	N-VA	Open Vld	sp.a	PP	VB	CD&V	Groen	Others	Lead	Gov.	Opp.
26 May 2019	2019 federal election			21.6%	20.0%	17.5%	12.3%	10.3%	5.8%	3.2%	2.3%	—	1.7%	1.6%	1.3%	—	—	1.6%		
6–14 May 2019	Ipsos	RTL TVi / Le Soir / VTM / Het Laatste Nieuws	519	22.9%	17.3%	15.5%	7.9%	13.7%	6.5%	5.7%	0.7%	—	2.0%	2.7%	0.8%	—	4.3%	5.6%	17.0%	83.0%
25 Mar-15 Apr 2019	TNS Kantar	RTBF / VRT / De Standaard / La Libre	759	21.5%	19.0%	15.5%	11.9%	8.5%	6.9%	4.2%	1.8%	1.1%	0.3%	1.3%	2.0%	3.0%	3.0% (Note: Including 1.0% for Alain Destexhe's list)	2.5%	19.3%	80.7%
5-11 Feb 2019	Ipsos	RTL TVi / Le Soir / VTM / Het Laatste Nieuws	559	19.9%	15.9%	15.3%	7.5%	12.5%	4.3%	6.4%	1.7%	2.1%	2.2%	1.9%	0.9%	2.7%	—	4.0%	17.9%	82.1%
9 Dec 2018	N-VA quit the government; the other three parties continue as a minority government. The crisis is due to divergent positions on the Global Compact for Migration.																			
19 Nov–8 Dec 2018	TNS	La Libre / RTBF / VRT / De Standaard	743	19.1%	15.8%	17.4%	11.5%	10.3%	5.6%	6.0%	1.1%	2.7%	1.7%	0.3%	3.1%	3.9%	—	1.7%	27.6%	70.9%
27 Nov-3 Dec 2018	Ipsos	RTL TVi / Le Soir / VTM / Het Laatste Nieuws	531	18.3%	15.4%	18.2%	5.8%	14.4%	4.5%	5.3%	1.1%	0.9%	3.7%	1.3%	1.2%	2.4%	—	0.1%	25.8%	66.7%
20–27 Sep 2018	Ipsos	RTL TVi / Le Soir / VTM / Het Laatste Nieuws	1000	13.1%	14.9%	19.5%	9.0%	15.8%	6.3%	6.5%	1.6%	0.7%	2.0%	2.0%	1.2%	2.2%	2.8%	3.7%	28.8%	62%
29 May–6 June 2018	Ipsos	RTL TVi / Le Soir / VTM / Het Laatste Nieuws	532	11.9%	14.2%	17%	9.5%	15.4%	7.4%	6.7%	2.3%	0.8%	2.4%	2.3%	0.9%	1.5%	7.7%	2.8%	26.9%	60.1%
26 Feb–17 Mar 2018	TNS Kantar	RTBF / VRT / De Standaard / La Libre	548	15.7%	21.8%	20.2%	5.8%	12.9%	9.0%	4.1%	2.6%	0.6%	1.7%	0.2%	1.9%	2.4%	4.5%	1.6%	28.8%	66.7%
27 Feb–6 Mar 2018	Ipsos	RTL TVi / Le Soir / VTM / Het Laatste Nieuws	548	13.5%	16.6%	17.8%	7.4%	14.3%	6.0%	6.0%	2.7%	0.4%	3.2%	1.0%	1.1%	3.6%	9.6%	1.2%	27.8%	62.6%
27 Nov–4 Dec 2017	Ipsos	RTL TVi / Le Soir / VTM / Het Laatste Nieuws	552	12.8%	17.6%	16.5%	7.9%	15.8%	5.0%	6.1%	1.4%	1.2%	2.5%	1.2%	1.3%	2.0%	8.7%	1.1%	25.3%	66.0%
11 Sep-8 Oct 2017	TNS Kantar	La Libre / RTBF / VRT / De Standaard	753	16.7%	15.1%	20.7%	9.7%	14.3%	7.6%	3.9%	1.7%	1.0%	0.8%	0.5%	2.2%	3.4%	2.4%	4.0%	28.5%	69.1%
25 Aug–3 Sep 2017	Ipsos	RTL TVi/Le Soir/VTM/ Het Laatste Nieuws	469	12.3%	12.1%	19.8%	9.0%	18.4%	5.8%	3.4%	2.0%	1.5%	2.5%	1.5%	1.8%	3.0%	—	1.4%	27.0%	66.1%
23–27 June 2017	Dedicated	L'Echo	679	12.5%	10.9%	20.7%	14.1%	15.7%	7.9%	4.1%	2.0%	1.0%	1.7%	1.9%	1.8%	2.3%	3.4%	5.0%	28.6%	61.1%
16–20 Mar 2017	Dedicated	RTBf / La Libre Belgique	914	13.1%	20.1%	18.7%	14.1%	10.4%	6.0%	3.7%	2.3%	0.7%	3.3%	2.6%	1.5%	1.1%	2.4%	1.4%	26.2%	71.4%
10–17 Jan 2017	Ipsos	RTL TVi/Le Soir/VTM/ Het Laatste Nieuws	510	10.8%	18.1%	18.4%	12.1%	9.3%	7.9%	5.1%	2.6%	1.9%	2.2%	1.7%	1.5%	2.5%	—	0.3%	27.6%	64.3%
24–28 Nov 2016	Dedicated	RTBf / La Libre Belgique	892	11.3%	20.4%	19%	9.6%	10.5%	7%	3.9%	2.8%	0.2%	3.7%	1.7%	2.5%	2.5%	5%	1.4%	28.2%	66.9%
19–25 Sep 2016	Ipsos	RTL TVi/Le Soir/VTM/ Het Laatste Nieuws	983	9.8%	15.5%	20.3%	11.2%	10.9%	7.8%	—	—	—	0.9%	—	—	—	—	4.8%	20.3%*	56.1%*
2–6 Sep 2016	Dedicated	RTBf / La Libre Belgique	917	12.9%	19.8%	20.1%	7.5%	11.3%	6.5%	4.2%	2.6%	1.5%	3.0%	2.4%	1.9%	1.8%	4.5%	0.3%	28.8%	66.7%
6–12 May 2016	Ipsos	RTL TVi/Le Soir/VTM/ Het Laatste Nieuws	505	8.9%	17.7%	19.7%	7.8%	10.7%	7.7%	—	—	—	2.0%	—	—	—	—	2.0%	19.7%*	54.8%*
31 March–4 Apr 2016	Dedicated	RTBF / La Libre Belgique	918	10.2%	21.1%	20.2%	6.1%	11.1%	8.8%	4.0%	2.6%	—	2.8%	2.3%	1.9%	1.2%	—	0.9%	28.7%	63.6%
15–20 Jan 2016	Ipsos	RTL TVi/Le Soir/VTM/ Het Laatste Nieuws	537	8.3%	18.2%	20.7%	7.0%	9.8%	6.8%	—	—	—	2.1%	—	—	—	2.7%	2.5%	20.7%*	52.2%*
Oct 2015	Ipsos	RTL TVi/Le Soir/VTM/ Het Laatste Nieuws	?	9.2%	26%	23.1%	8.8%	3.4%	11.1%	—	—	—	5.2%	—	—	—	—	2.9%	23.1%*	63.7*
5–9 Mar 2015	Dedicated	RTBF / La Libre Belgique	907	9.4%	19.7%	22.6%	5.6%	12.3%	9.9%	3.5%	2.6%	3.1%	2.2%	0.8%	1.3%	1.8%	3.6%	2.9%	30.0%	65.9%
Nov 2014	Dedicated	RTBF / La Libre Belgique	?	11.8%	26.2%	21.7%	6.0%	9.2%	8.1%	3.2%	2.1%	2.2%	1.4%	2.3%	1.9%	1.2%	1.7%	4.5%	28.9%	68.4%
Sep 2014	Dedicated	RTBF / La Libre Belgique	?	11.5%	23.9%	23.7%	3.7%	11.9%	10.4%	2.9%	3.3%	1.4%	1.4%	1.2%	2.2%	0.9%	2.0%	0.2%	32.1%	66.3%
25 May 2014	Federal election			10.5%	25.6%	21.9%	4.0%	10.8%	9.4%	2.6%	2.6%	2.0%	1.8%	1.1%	1.7%	*	5.9%	3.7%	28.8%	65.2%

== Seat projections ==
The table below shows seat projections for the Belgian Chamber of Representatives when given by the reporting newspaper or polling firm.

=== By party ===
Summary of seats projections given below from the election result 25 May 2014. Lines give the mean estimated by a LOESS smoother (smoothing set to span = 0.75).

76 seats needed for majority
Date(s) conducted	Polling firm	Publishers	N-VA	PS	VB	MR	Ecolo	CD&V	Open Vld	PVDA- PTB	sp.a	Groen	cdH	DéFI	PP	Others	Lead	Gov.	Opp.	Lead
26 May 2019	Federal election		25	20	18	14	13	12	12	12	9	8	5	2	0	0	5			
6 - 14 May 2019	Ipsos	RTL TVi / Le Soir / VTM / Het Laatste Nieuws	27	20	13	16	15	16	10	7	9	11	4	2	0	0	7	42	108	66
25 Mar - 15 Apr 2019	Kantar	VRT / De Standaard / RTBF / La Libre	27	20	8	13	16	14	12	12	11	12	4	1	0	0	7	39	111	72
5 Feb - 11 Feb 2019	Ipsos	RTL TVi / Le Soir / VTM / Het Laatste Nieuws	28	18	8	14	14	14	12	8	9	15	5	3	2	0	10	40	110	70
**9 Dec 2018**	**N-VA quit the government; the other three parties continue as a minority government. The crisis is due to divergent positions on the Global Compact for Migration.**																			
27 Nov - 3 Dec 2018	Ipsos	RTL TVi / Le Soir / VTM / Het Laatste Nieuws	29	17	9	16	10	13	12	10	11	11	7	3	2	0	12	70	80	10
**14 Oct 2018**	**KU Leuven (Note: Extrapolation from provincial elections)**	**Samenleving & Politiek**	24	**19**	**10**	**17**	**11**	**19**	**13**	**5**	**9**	**12**	**7**	**4**	**0**	**0**	5	**73**	77	4
20–27 Sep 2018	Ipsos	RTL TVi / Le Soir / VTM / Het Laatste Nieuws	26	17	9	16	7	17	12	9	11	12	6	6	2	0	9	71	79	8
29 May – 6 June 2018	Ipsos	RTL TVi / Le Soir / VTM / Het Laatste Nieuws	29	17	8	15	9	14	12	12	11	11	5	5	2	0	12	70	80	10
26 Feb – 17 Mar 2018	TNS Kantar	RTBF / VRT / De Standaard / La Libre	32	18	6	17	12	14	12	10	7	12	5	5	0	0	14	**75**	75	0
27 Feb – 6 Mar 2018	Ipsos	RTL TVi / Le Soir / VTM / Het Laatste Nieuws	32	18	7	15	10	14	11	12	11	10	4	6	0	0	14	72	78	6
27 Nov – 4 Dec 2017	Ipsos	RTL TVi / Le Soir / VTM / Het Laatste Nieuws	30	16	8	15	9	14	12	14	10	11	5	6	0	0	14	71	79	8
25 Aug – 3 Sep 2017	Ipsos	RTL TVi / Le Soir / VTM / Het Laatste Nieuws	30	15	7	17	9	14	11	13	11	12	5	6	0	0	13	72	78	6
23–27 June 2017	Dedicated	L'Echo	26	11	10	18	7	16	12	**26**	7	10	4	3	0	0	Tie	72	78	6
16–20 Mar 2017	Dedicated	RTBf / La Libre Belgique	28	16	10	18	8	13	12	16	11	10	6	2	0	0	10	71	79	8
10–17 Jan 2017	Ipsos	RTL TVi / Le Soir / VTM / Het Laatste Nieuws	29	17	8	17	8	14	12	13	11	11	7	2	1	0	12	72	78	6
19–25 Sep 2016	Ipsos	RTL TVi / Le Soir / VTM / Het Laatste Nieuws	24	19	10	19	5	18	11	11	13	10	6	2	2	0	5	72	78	6
6–12 May 2016	Ipsos	RTL TVi / Le Soir / VTM / Het Laatste Nieuws	24	20	12	15	7	13	12	10	14	11	8	2	2	0	4	64	86	22
15–20 Jan 2016	Ipsos	RTL TVi / Le Soir / VTM / Het Laatste Nieuws	28	21	9	19	7	14	12	6	14	9	8	2	1	0	7	73	77	4
**25 May 2014**	**Federal election**		33	**23**	**3**	**20**	**6**	**18**	**14**	**2**	**13**	**6**	**9**	**2**	**1**	**0**	10	**85**	65	20

=== By political family ===
Tallies for each ideology and probable coalitions. In bold on dark grey, if the coalition commands an absolute majority, in italic on light grey, if the coalition needs DéFI's support (which implies it does not include the N-VA).

Note that "asymmetrical" coalitions are now frequent: between 2007 and 2011, PS was part of each cabinet but not sp.a; and between 2014 and 2018, the Michel Government included CD&V but not cdH, as well as the N-VA, of which there is no equivalent in Wallonia.

Date(s) conducted	Polling firm	Ideologies								Coalitions							
Date(s) conducted	Polling firm	Far- left	Ecologists	Socialists	Social- liberals	Christian- democrats	Liberals	National- conserv.	Far- right	Left- wing	Olive Tree	Purple-green	Rainbow (Vivaldi + cdH)	Jamaica	Tripartite	Burgundy	Swedish + cdH
26 May 2019	Federal Elections	12	21	**29**	2	17	26	25	18	62	67	76	93	64	72	80	68
6 - 14 May 2019	Ipsos	7	26	**29**	2	20	26	27	13	62	75	**83**	103	72	75	**82**	73
25 Mar–15 Apr 2019	Kantar	12	28	**31**	1	18	25	27	8	71	**77**	**84**	102	71	74	**83**	70
5–11 Feb 2019	Ipsos	8	**29**	27	3	19	26	28	10	64	75	**82**	101	74	72	**81**	73
**9 Dec 2018**	**N-VA quits government over migration pact**																
27 Nov–3 Dec 2018	Ipsos	10	21	28	3	20	28	**29**	11	59	69	**77**	97	69	**76**	**85**	**77**
**14 Oct 2018**	**Provincial elections**	5	23	28	4	26	**30**	24	10	56	**77**	**81**	**107**	**79**	**84**	**82**	**80**
20–27 Sep 2018	Ipsos	9	19	**28**	6	23	**28**	26	11	56	70	75	98	70	**79**	**82**	**77**
29 May–6 June 2018	Ipsos	12	20	28	5	19	27	**29**	10	60	67	75	94	66	74	**84**	75
26 Feb–17 Mar 2018	TNS Kantar	10	24	25	5	19	29	**32**	6	59	68	**78**	97	72	73	**86**	**80**
27 Feb–6 Mar 2018	Ipsos	12	20	29	6	18	26	**32**	7	61	67	75	93	64	73	**87**	**76**
27 Nov–4 Dec 2017	Ipsos	14	20	26	6	19	27	**30**	8	60	65	73	92	66	72	**76**	**76**
25 Aug–3 Sep 2017	Ipsos	13	21	26	6	19	28	**30**	7	60	66	75	94	68	73	**77**	**77**
23–27 June 2017	Dedicated	26	17	18	3	20	**30**	26	10	61	55	65	85	67	68	74	**76**
16–20 Mar 2017	Dedicated	16	18	27	2	19	**30**	28	10	61	64	75	94	67	**76**	**85**	**77**
10–17 Jan 2017	Ipsos	13	19	28	2	21	**29**	**29**	9	60	68	**76**	97	69	**78**	**86**	**79**
19–25 Sep 2016	Ipsos	11	15	**32**	2	24	30	24	12	58	71	**77**	101	69	**86**	**86**	**78**
6–12 May 2016	Ipsos	10	18	**34**	2	21	27	24	14	62	73	**79**	100	66	**82**	**85**	72
15–20 Jan 2016	Ipsos	6	16	**35**	2	22	31	28	10	57	73	**82**	104	69	**88**	**94**	**81**
**25 May 2014**	**Federal elections**	**2**	**12**	**36**	**2**	**27**	**34**	**33**	**4**	**50**	**75**	**82**	**109**	**73**	**97**	**103**	**94**
