= Death at the Club =

1937 novel

- First edition (UK)
- Author: Cecil Street
- Language: English
- Series: Desmond Merrion
- Genre: Detective
- Publisher: Collins (UK); Doubleday (US)
- Publication date: 1937
- Publication place: United Kingdom
- Media type: Print
- Preceded by: Murder of a Chemist
- Followed by: Murder in Crown Passage

Death at the Club is a 1937 detective novel by the British writer Cecil Street, writing under the pen name of Miles Burton. It is the fifteenth in a series of books featuring the amateur detective Desmond Merrion and Inspector Arnold of Scotland Yard. It was published in the United States by Doubleday the same year under the alternative title The Clue of the Fourteen Keys. It takes the form of both a locked room mystery and a closed circle of suspects, both popular branches of the genre during the decade.

In the Times Literary Supplement Elizabeth L. Sturch noted "Mr. Miles Burton can always be relied on for a good, serious, straightforward detective story with no shilly-shallying and no side-issues to divert the reader’s attention from the all-important task of discovering the murderer". Isaac Anderson in the New York Times felt "the author has contrived a pleasing combination of routine police procedure with clever deduction".

== Synopsis ==
The Assistant Commissioner of the Metropolitan Police is a member of London's exclusive Witchcraft Club and while there he encounters the corpse of the club secretary. He and the other twelve remaining members of the club are all suspects, to the embarrassment of the investigating Inspector Arnold. Only the intervention of his friend Merrion leads to the solving of the case.

== Bibliography ==
- Evans, Curtis. Masters of the "Humdrum" Mystery: Cecil John Charles Street, Freeman Wills Crofts, Alfred Walter Stewart and the British Detective Novel, 1920-1961. McFarland, 2014.
- Herbert, Rosemary. Whodunit?: A Who's Who in Crime & Mystery Writing. Oxford University Press, 2003.
- Reilly, John M. Twentieth Century Crime & Mystery Writers. Springer, 2015.
