= Leon Forrest =

American novelist

Leon Forrest

Leon Richard Forrest (January 8, 1937 – November 6, 1997) was an African-American novelist who taught at Northwestern University from 1973 until his death. His four major novels used mythology, history, and humor to explore "Forest County," a fictional world that resembled the south side of Chicago where Forrest grew up. After his death, the Washington Post called Forrest "one of the best-kept secrets of contemporary African-American fiction -- and an acquired taste."

== Biography ==
Forrest was born into a middle-class family in Chicago. His mother was Catholic and from New Orleans, while his father's family was Baptist. Forrest attended Catholic school as a child, which later influenced his writing. His paternal great-grandmother had a role in his early upbringing. Forrest later attended a racially integrated high school after winning an award, but he was a generally mediocre student except for writing. His parents divorced in 1956; his mother remarried, and the couple opened a liquor store.

Forrest attended Wendell Phillips grade school and Hyde Park High School. He then attended Wilson Junior College for a year, and then took classes at Roosevelt University and the University of Chicago before dropping out, leaving to serve as a Public Information Officer in the military. After leaving the service, he returned to the University of Chicago and worked for the Catholic Interracial Council's Speakers Bureau. In 1969, he began working for Muhammad Speaks, a Nation of Islam newspaper. Forrest would become the last non-Muslim editor of the paper.

His first novel, There is a Tree More Ancient than Eden, was published in 1973 and included an introduction from Ralph Ellison. Nobel Prize Laureate Toni Morrison served as Forrest's editor for There is a Tree More Ancient than Eden, and his next two novels, The Bloodworth Orphans and Two Wings to Veil My Face. These three novels were known as the Forest County Trilogy. He cited Charlie Parker, Dylan Thomas, William Faulkner, Eugene O'Neill, Ralph Ellison, and his parents' religions as inspirations.

Forrest joined the creative writing and literature staff of Northwestern University in 1973, and from 1985 to 1994 he headed their African-American Studies department. His last novel, Divine Days, was modeled on Ulysses by James Joyce. A novel over 1,100 pages long, Divine Days was called "the War and Peace of African-American literature" by noted scholar and Harvard professor Henry Louis Gates.

Forrest died of cancer in Evanston, Illinois at age 60. Meteor in the Madhouse, a series of connected novellas, was published posthumously in 2001, with his widow Marianne Forrest serving as literary executor. The Washington Post review said Meteor in the Madhouse will be "regarded as a major event" and a "significant landmark."

In 2013, Forrest was inducted into the Chicago Literary Hall of Fame.

== References and further reading ==
- Eig, Jonathan (15 April 2011), "Bound for Glory", Chicago Magazine
- Williams, Dana A., ed. (2007). Conversations with Leon Forrest. Jackson: University Press of Mississippi. ISBN 9781578069897. Interviews with Forrest on his work.
- Williams, Dana A. (2005). "In the Light of Likeness--Transformed": The Literary Art of Leon Forrest. Columbus: Ohio State University Press. ISBN 0814209947.

== Major fiction ==
- There Is a Tree More Ancient than Eden (Random House, 1973; expanded edition, 1988))
- The Bloodworth Orphans (Random House, 1977)
- Two Wings to Veil My Face (Asphodel, 1984)
- Divine Days (Another Chicago Press, 1992)
- Relocations of the Spirit: Collected Essays (Asphodel, 1994)
- Meteor in the Madhouse (Northwestern University, 2001)
