= La Libre Belgique =

French-language Belgian daily newspaper

- Type: Daily newspaper (six times per week)
- Format: Compact
- Owner: La Libre Belgique S.A.
- Publisher: IPM Advertising
- Editor: Dorian de Meeûs
- Founded: Le Patriote: 1884; La Libre Belgique: 1915
- Political alignment: Centrist to Centre-right
- Language: French
- Headquarters: Rue des Francs / Frankenstraat 47, 1040 Etterbeek, Brussels-Capital Region, Belgium
- Circulation: 23,198 (2022)
- ISSN: 1379-6992
- Website: www.lalibre.be

La Libre Belgique (French pronunciation: [la libʁ bɛlʒik]; lit. 'The Free Belgium'), currently sold under the name La Libre, is a French-language Belgian daily newspaper. Together with Le Soir, it is one of the most popular Francophone newspapers in both Brussels and Wallonia. La Libre was founded in 1884 and historically had a centre-right Christian Democratic political stance. The papers is particularly celebrated for its role as an underground newspaper during World War I and World War II when Belgium was occupied. Since 1999, the newspaper has become increasingly liberal but is still considered to the right of Le Soir.

== History ==
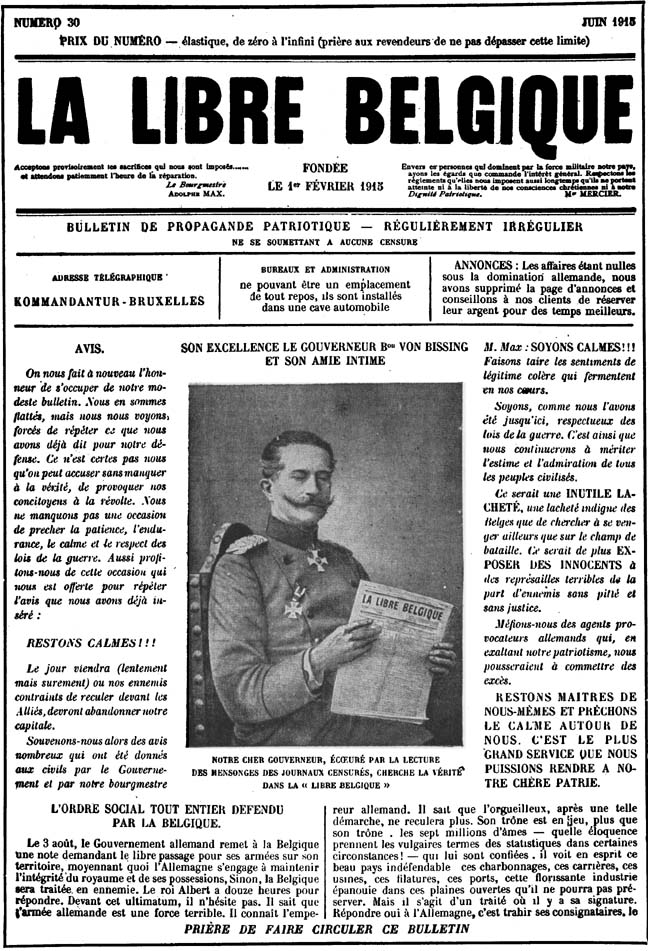
A clandestinely produced issue of La Libre Belgique from during World War I (1915)

The modern La Libre traces its origins to the Le Patriote newspaper, founded by Victor and Louis Jourdain in 1884. Politically, the newspaper supported the dominant centre-right Catholic Party.

After the German invasion of Belgium in World War I, Le Patriote was banned by the German occupation authorities. In February 1915, however, it was re-founded in secret by the Jourdain brothers as an underground newspaper called La Libre Belgique ("Free Belgium"). The new title was an allusion to a collaborationist paper called La Belgique ("Belgium"). A total of 171 issues of La Libre Belgique appeared during the occupation. It soon became famous as an example of Belgian resistance. Several weeks before the end of the hostilities, both of the Jourdain brothers died of natural causes. Their work was continued by Victor's two sons Joseph and Paul Jourdain.

The newspaper was also published secretly in German-occupied Belgium during World War II in a number of unofficial editions. The largest, known as the La Libre Belgique of Peter Pan (after the fictional editor's name given on the masthead) achieved a circulation of 10,000 to 30,000 copies. 85 bi-monthly issues were published.

After the war, La Libre Belgique supported the mainstream Christian Social Party and, until 1999, the paper had a strong Christian Democratic stance. Currently the newspaper has a centrist editorial policy.

== La Libre today ==
La Libre is published six times per week (from Monday to Saturday) by the IPM publishing group and has its headquarters in Brussels. The current editor in chief is Dorian de Meeûs. An online edition of the paper was started in 2001. The paper has been published in a compact format since 2002.

La Libre was noted widely as one of the papers involved in a feud with Google relating to which content that could be linked and cached by Google. In July 2011, the paper was totally removed from Google News and Google's normal web search.

== Circulation ==
La Libre Belgique reached a record circulation of 190,000 copies in 1959. In 1990 the paper sold 170,000 copies. However, by 1999 it had dropped to 68,212 copies. The 2002 circulation of the paper was 61,463 copies with a market share of 9.6 percent. The circulation of the paper was 42,000 in copies in 2010. In 2016, the paper had a circulation of 35,500 with an online traffic of 1-5 million. In 2022, the paper had a circulation of 23,198 copies according to official IPM documents.

== Films ==
Aspects of the newspaper's history reflecting the Belgian Resistance appeared in the 1942 feature film Uncensored and the 1941 documentary short Out of Darkness, part of The Passing Parade series.

== See also ==
- Gabrielle Petit
- Charlotte Ruegger
