= 1940 in literature =

This article contains information about the literary events and publications of 1940.

== Events ==
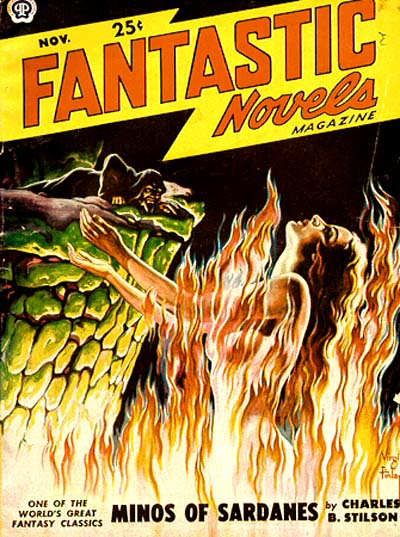
The cover of the November 1949 issue of Fantastic Novels, illustrated by Virgil Finlay

- January – The English literary magazine Horizon first appears in London, with Cyril Connolly, Peter Watson and Stephen Spender contributing.
- February – The Canadian writer Robertson Davies leaves the Old Vic repertory company in the United Kingdom.
- March 11 – Ed Ricketts, John Steinbeck and six others leave Monterey for the Gulf of California on a marine invertebrate collecting expedition.
- April – Máirtín Ó Cadhain is interned by the Irish government at Curragh Camp, as a member of the Irish Republican Army.
- May 14 – The Battle of the Netherlands ends with the surrender of the main Dutch forces to Nazi German invaders. This evening, the gay Dutch Jewish writer Jacob Hiegentlich takes poison, dying four days later aged 33.
- June 5 – The English novelist J. B. Priestley broadcasts his first Sunday evening radio Postscript, "An excursion to hell", on the BBC Home Service in the United Kingdom, marking the role of pleasure steamers in the Dunkirk evacuation, which ended the day before.
- July
  - Jean-Paul Sartre is taken prisoner by the Germans. Léopold Sédar Senghor also becomes a prisoner of war this year. P. G. Wodehouse is interned by the Germans as an enemy alien.
  - American science fiction and fantasy pulp magazine Fantastic Novels begins its first run.
- July 26 – A movie adaptation of Jane Austen's Pride and Prejudice is released, with Aldous Huxley as a screenwriter.
- September – In Uriage-les-Bains, Vichy France, Emmanuel Mounier and the Esprit circle establish a school of government and philosophy attuned to Catholic social teaching. Initially endorsing the Révolution nationale, Uriage is put off by Vichy's collaboration with Germany, and blends into the Christian left.
- September 10 – Virginia Woolf's London house at 37 Mecklenburgh Square is destroyed by bombing. On October 18 she sees the ruins of her previous home, 52 Tavistock Square, Bloomsbury, similarly destroyed.
- October
  - Graham Greene's London house on Clapham Common Northside is destroyed by bombing, an event reflected in his novels The Ministry of Fear (1943) and The End of the Affair (1951).
  - Philip Larkin enters St John's College, Oxford.
- October 4 – Brian O'Nolan's first "Cruiskeen Lawn" humorous column is published in The Irish Times (Dublin). In the second column he assumes the pseudonym Myles na gCopaleen. The original columns are composed in Irish. He continues the column until the year of his death in 1966.
- December – Penguin Books launches its Puffin Books children's imprint in the United Kingdom with War on Land by James Holland.
- December 21 – F. Scott Fitzgerald dies of a heart attack aged 44 in the apartment of Hollywood gossip columnist Sheilah Graham, leaving his novel The Last Tycoon unfinished. The following day, his friend and fellow novelist and screenwriter, Nathanael West, is killed aged 37 in an automobile accident in California.
- December 29 – Heavy bombing causes a Second Great Fire of London, destroying the premises of Simpkin, Marshall, the U.K.'s largest book wholesaler, and of many publishers also in the Paternoster Row area, including Longman, together with some 25,000 volumes in the Guildhall Library's stores and a copy of the Rubaiyat of Omar Khayyam in a jewelled binding by Sangorski & Sutcliffe (1939). On dawn patrol as a fighter pilot, Douglas Blackwood sees his family's publishing business, William Blackwood, burning.
- December 31 – Echternacher Anzeiger, a Luxembourg newspaper, ends publication.
- unknown dates
  - The Russian poet Anna Akhmatova's collection From Six Books appears in the Soviet Union, but distribution is soon suspended, copies pulped and remaining issues prohibited.
  - Wills & Hepworth of Loughborough begins publishing Ladybird Books in the United Kingdom in a new format, with Bunnykin's Picnic Party: a story in verse for children with illustrations in colour.

== New books ==
=== Fiction ===
- Eric Ambler – Journey into Fear
- Thomas Armstrong – The Crowthers of Bankdam
- Frank Baker – Miss Hargreaves
- Pridi Banomyong – The King of the White Elephant
- Giorgio Bassani – Una città di pianura
- Henry Bellamann – Kings Row
- Pierre Benoit – The Environs of Aden
- Phyllis Bottome – Heart of a Child
- Marjorie Bowen – The Crime of Laura Sarelle
- Karin Boye – Kallocain
- Lynn Brock – The Stoat
- John Brophy – Green Ladies
- Douglas Brown and Christopher Serpell – Loss of Eden: a cautionary tale
- Heðin Brú – Feðgar á ferð (The Old Man and His Sons)
- Edgar Rice Burroughs – Synthetic Men of Mars
- Gerald Butler – Kiss the Blood Off My Hands
- Dino Buzzati – The Tartar Steppe (Il deserto dei Tartari)
- Arthur Calder-Marshall – The Way to Santiago
- Erskine Caldwell – Trouble in July
- Taylor Caldwell – The Earth is the Lord's
- Victor Canning – Mr. Finchley Takes the Road
- Joyce Carey – Charley is My Darling
- John Dickson Carr
  - The Department of Queer Complaints
  - The Man Who Could Not Shudder
  - And So To Murder (as Carter Dickson)
  - Murder in the Submarine Zone (as Carter Dickson)
- Adolfo Bioy Casares – The Invention of Morel (La invención de Morel)
- Willa Cather – Sapphira and the Slave Girl
- Raymond Chandler – Farewell, My Lovely
- Peter Cheyney
  - You Can't Keep the Change
  - You'd Be Surprised
- Agatha Christie
  - Sad Cypress
  - One, Two, Buckle My Shoe
- Walter Clark – The Ox-bow Incident
- G. D. H. Cole and Margaret Cole – Murder at the Munition Works
- J. J. Connington – The Four Defences
- Freeman Wills Crofts – Golden Ashes
- James Daugherty – Daniel Boone
- Cecil Day-Lewis – Malice in Wonderland
- Georges Duhamel – Les Maîtres
- Mircea Eliade – The Secret of Dr. Honigberger (Secretul doctorului Honigberger; published with Nights at Serampore)
- Margita Figuli – Three Chestnut Horses
- Anthony Gilbert – Dear Dead Woman
- Graham Greene – The Power and the Glory
- Ernest Hemingway – For Whom the Bell Tolls
- Georgette Heyer – The Corinthian
- Anne Hocking – The Wicked Flee
- Dorothy B. Hughes – The So Blue Marble
- Hammond Innes
  - The Trojan Horse
  - Wreckers Must Breathe
- Michael Innes
  - The Secret Vanguard
  - There Came Both Mist and Snow
- Anna Kavan – Asylum Piece (short stories)
- Arthur Koestler – Darkness at Noon
- E. C. R. Lorac – Death at Dyke's Corner
- Marie Belloc Lowndes – The Christine Diamond
- Carson McCullers – The Heart Is a Lonely Hunter
- Ngaio Marsh – Death at the Bar
- W. Somerset Maugham – The Mixture as Before (short stories)
- Gladys Mitchell – Brazen Tongue
- Nancy Mitford – Pigeon Pie
- John O'Hara – Pal Joey
- E. Phillips Oppenheim – Last Train Out
- Raymond Postgate – Verdict of Twelve
- John Cowper Powys – Owen Glendower
- Clayton Rawson -- The Headless Lady
- Michael Sadleir – Fanny by Gaslight
- Mikhail Sholokov – The Don Flows Home to the Sea (English translation of part 2 of Тихий Дон – Tikhii Don, The Quiet Don)
- C. P. Snow – George Passant (first in the Strangers and Brothers series)
- Christina Stead – The Man Who Loved Children
- Rex Stout
  - Over My Dead Body
  - Where There's a Will
- Cecil Street
  - Death on the Boat Train
  - Death Takes a Flat
  - Mr. Westerby Missing
  - Murder at Lilac Cottage
- Phoebe Atwood Taylor
  - The Criminal C. O. D.
  - The Deadly Sunshade
  - The Left Leg (as Alice Tilton)
- Dylan Thomas – Portrait of the Artist as a Young Dog (short stories)
- Luis Trenker – Captain Ladurner
- Sachchidananda Vatsyayan – Shekhar: Ek Jivani
- Henry Wade – Lonely Magdalen
- Ethel Lina White – While She Sleeps
- Richard Wright – Native Son
- Francis Brett Young – Mr. Lucton's Freedom
- Xiao Hong (蕭紅) – Ma Bole (马伯乐)

=== Children and young people ===
- Enid Blyton – The Naughtiest Girl in the School
- Godfried Bomans – Eric in the Land of the Insects (Erik of het klein insectenboek)
- Ingri and Edgar Parin d'Aulaire – Abraham Lincoln
- Doris Gates – Blue Willow
- Dorothy Kunhardt – Pat the Bunny
- Phyllis Matthewman – Chloe Takes Control (first in the Danewood series of seven books)
- Arthur Ransome – The Big Six
- Marjorie Kinnan Rawlings – When the Whippoorwill
- Dr. Seuss – Horton Hatches the Egg
- Armstrong Sperry – Call It Courage
- Jakob Streit – Beatuslegenden
- Geoffrey Trease – Cue for Treason
- John R. Tunis – The Kid from Tomkinsville
- Laura Ingalls Wilder – The Long Winter

=== Drama ===
- Jean Anouilh – Léocadia
- Ugo Betti – Il cacciatore di anitre (The Duck Hunter)
- Peter Blackmore – The Blue Goose
- Bertolt Brecht – Mr Puntila and his Man Matti (Herr Puntila und sein Knecht Matti, written)
- Agatha Christie – Peril at End House
- Jean Cocteau – Le Bel indifférent
- Hermann Heuvers – Hosokawa Gracia Fujin
- Artturi Järviluoma – Pohjalaisia
- Terence Rattigan and Anthony Goldsmith – Follow My Leader (first performed)
- Lawrence Riley – Return Engagement
- George Shiels – The Rugged Path
- Vernon Sylvaine – Nap Hand
- John Van Druten
  - Leave Her to Heaven
  - Old Acquaintance
- Emlyn Williams
  - The Corn Is Green
  - The Light of Heart

=== Non-fiction ===
- Mortimer J. Adler – How to Read a Book
- "Cato" (Michael Foot, Frank Owen, and Peter Howard) – Guilty Men
- George Gamow – The Birth and Death of the Sun
- G. H. Hardy – A Mathematician's Apology
- Bernard Leach – A Potter's Book
- C. S. Lewis – The Problem of Pain
- Karl Mannheim – Man and Society in the Age of Reconstruction
- Arthur Marder – The Anatomy of British Sea Power: a history of British naval policy in the pre-Dreadnought era, 1880–1905
- A. A. Milne – War with Honour
- Malcolm Muggeridge – The Thirties
- Hugh Trevor-Roper – Archbishop Laud, 1573–1645
- Edmund Wilson – To the Finland Station

== Births ==
- January 4 – Gao Xingjian (高行健), Chinese novelist
- January 6 – Narendra Kohli, Indian author (died 2021)
- January 13 – Edmund White, American writer (died 2025)
- January 15 – Ted Lewis, English novelist (died 1982)
- January 22 – Peter Jaroš, Slovak novelist (died 2026)
- January 23 – Mario Levrero, Uruguayan novelist (died 2004)
- February 6 – Tom Brokaw, American television journalist and author
- February 8 – Ted Koppel, American journalist
- February 9
  - J. M. Coetzee, South African novelist
  - Seamus Deane, Irish poet and novelist (died 2021)
- March 16 – Bernardo Bertolucci, Italian writer and film director (died 2018
- March 23 – Ama Ata Aidoo, Ghanaian playwright (died 2023)
- March 28 – Russell Banks, American novelist and poet (died 2023)
- April 6 - Homero Aridjis, Mexican poet, novelist and environmentalist
- April 13 – J. M. G. Le Clézio, French novelist
- April 15 – Jeffrey Archer, English novelist, politician and perjurer (died 2026)
- April 21 – Peter Schneider, German writer (died 2026)
- April 24 – Sue Grafton, American detective novelist (died 2017)
- April 30 – Jeroen Brouwers, Dutch writer (died 2022)
- May 1 – Bobbie Ann Mason, American novelist, short story writer, essayist and literary critic
- May 7 – Angela Carter, English novelist (died 1992)
- May 8 – Peter Benchley, American novelist (died 2006)
- May 13 – Bruce Chatwin, English novelist and travel writer (died 1989)
- May 24 – Joseph Brodsky, Russian-born American poet and essayist (died 1996)
- May 28 – Maeve Binchy, Irish novelist (died 2012)
- July 17 – Tim Brooke-Taylor, English comedy writer and performer (died 2020)
- July 31 – Fleur Jaeggy, Swiss-Italian fiction writer
- September 1 – Annie Ernaux, French author and Nobel laureate
- September 3 – Eduardo Galeano, Uruguayan journalist, writer and novelist (died 2015)
- September 14 – Ventseslav Konstantinov, Bulgarian writer and translator (died 2019)
- September 22 – Thomas Harris, American writer
- October 11 – David McFadden, Canadian poet, fiction and travel writer (died 2018)
- October 15 – Fanny Howe, American poet, novelist and short story writer (died 2025)
- October 20 – Robert Pinsky, American poet
- November 15 – René Avilés Fabila, Mexican writer (died 2016)
- November 20 – Wendy Doniger O'Flaherty, American Indologist and translator
- December 5 – Peter Pohl, Swedish novelist
- December 29 – Brigitte Kronauer, German novelist (died 2019)
- Stan Grant, Wiradjuri Australian writer

== Deaths ==
- January 1 – Panuganti Lakshminarasimha Rao, Indian writer (born 1865)
- January 5 – Humbert Wolfe, British poet and epigrammist (born 1885)
- January 27 – Isaak Babel, Russian journalist and dramatist (executed, born 1894)
- February 11 – John Buchan, Scottish novelist (born 1875)
- February 29
  - E. F. Benson, English novelist, biographer, memoirist and short-story writer (born 1867)
  - Emma Shaw Colcleugh, American author (born 1846)
- March 7 – Edwin Markham, American poet (born 1852)
- March 10 – Mikhail Bulgakov, Russian novelist and playwright (born 1891)
- March 11 – John Monk Saunders, American writer (suicide, born 1897)
- March 12 – Florence White, English food writer (born 1863)
- March 16
  - Sir Thomas Little Heath, English classicist and translator (born 1861)
  - Selma Lagerlöf, Swedish children's writer and Nobel laureate (born 1858)
- April 13 – Mary Bathurst Deane, English novelist (born 1843)
- June 1 – Jan F. E. Celliers, South African Afrikaans-language poet, essayist, dramatist and critic (born 1865)
- June 10 – Marcus Garvey, Jamaican journalist and publisher (born 1887)
- June 20 – Charley Chase, American screenwriter (born 1893)
- June 21 – Hendrik Marsman, Dutch poet (born 1899)
- August 4 – Ze'ev Jabotinsky, Russian-born Zionist leader, novelist and poet (heart attack, born 1880)
- August 7 – T. O'Conor Sloane, American editor (born 1851)
- September 8 – Constantin Banu, Romanian politician, journalist, cultural promoter and aphorist (born 1873)
- September 26 – W. H. Davies, Welsh poet (born 1871)
- November 27 – Nicolae Iorga, Romanian historian, politician, culture critic, poet and playwright (assassinated, born 1871)
- December 21 – F. Scott Fitzgerald, American novelist (born 1896)
- December 22 – Nathanael West, American screenwriter and satirist (automobile accident, born 1903)

== Awards ==
- Carnegie Medal for children's literature: Kitty Barne, Visitors from London
- James Tait Black Memorial Prize for fiction: Charles Morgan, The Voyage
- James Tait Black Memorial Prize for biography: Hilda F. M. Prescott, Spanish Tudor: Mary I of England
- Newbery Medal for children's literature: James Daugherty, Daniel Boone
- Nobel Prize in Literature: not awarded
- Prix Goncourt: Francis Ambrière, Les grandes vacances (awarded in retrospect)
- Pulitzer Prize for Drama: William Saroyan, The Time of Your Life
- Pulitzer Prize for Poetry: Mark Van Doren, Collected Poems
- Pulitzer Prize for the Novel: John Steinbeck, The Grapes of Wrath
- King's Gold Medal for Poetry: Michael Thwaites
