= Political and Literary Annals =

French literary magazine

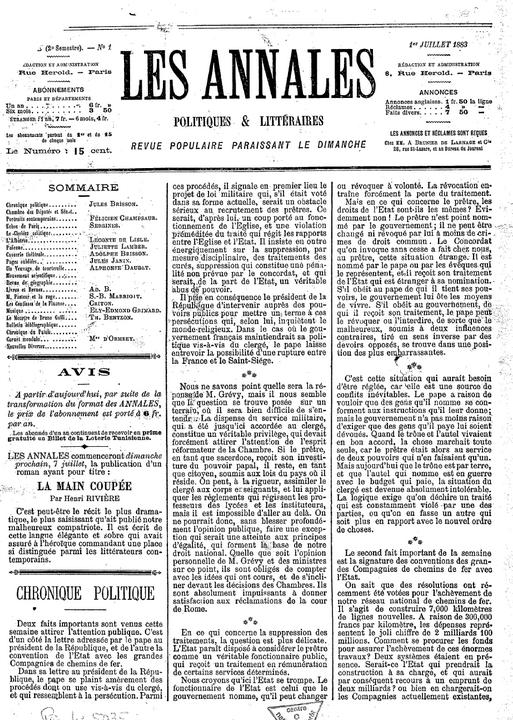
- Les Annales politiques et littéraires
- Categories: Literary magazine
- First issue: June 22, 1883; 142 years ago
- Country: France
- Language: French

Political and Literary Annals or Les Annales politiques et littéraires was a French literature magazine that was established in 1883 by Jules Brisson and it ceased to operate in 1971.

== History and description ==
Political and Literary Annals was established on June 22, 1883, by Jules Brisson and his son, Adolphe. Its first issue was named as “popular review appearing on Sundays”. The first issue having 6 pages had come out on 1 July 1883 and is had been priced at 15 cents. Apart from Brissons' the editorial staff of the Annals also included Yvonne Sarcey, the daughter of Francisque Sarcey and wife of Adolphe. In 1907, she started the University of the Annals (fr:université des Annales) which was an organized version of conferences.

The literary reviews in Political and Literary Annals were written by prominent contemporary figures including Félicien Champsaur, Jules Janin, Alphonse Daudet etc.. Les Annales politique et littéraires quickly enjoyed great success, particularly among the provincial bourgeoisie.

In 1919, Pierre Brisson, son of Yvonne and Adolphe, started to operate the magazine, which he completely took over in 1925 before joining that of Le Figaro in 1934. From 1927, the magazine started to get published bimonthly. During 1934 to 1940, Gérard Bauër served as the editor of the magazine. The magazine temporarily stopped operating in the year 1940. Madeleine Brisson relaunched it in 1945. From the year 1950, the magazine started to publish monthly and was co-published with Conférencia, the journal of the University of Annales. During this time it was being edited by Francis Ambrière. The two titles then simultaneously appeared until 1953. Eventually the magazine stopped its operation in 1971. The last issue was published as a reprint version in 1972 in the columns of Le Figaro, under the title of "Les Conferences du Figaro".
