= Les Grandes Vacances =

Les Grandes Vacances may refer to:

- The Long Holiday (Les Grandes Vacances), 1946 novel by Francis Ambrière
- Les Grandes Vacances (film), 1967 film by Jean Girault
