= Calder-Marshall =

Calder-Marshall is a surname. Notable people with the surname include:

- Anna Calder-Marshall (born 1947), English stage, film and television actress
- Arthur Calder-Marshall (1908–1992), English novelist, essayist, critic, memoirist, and biographer
