= Spiez Castle =

- Schloss Spiez (German)
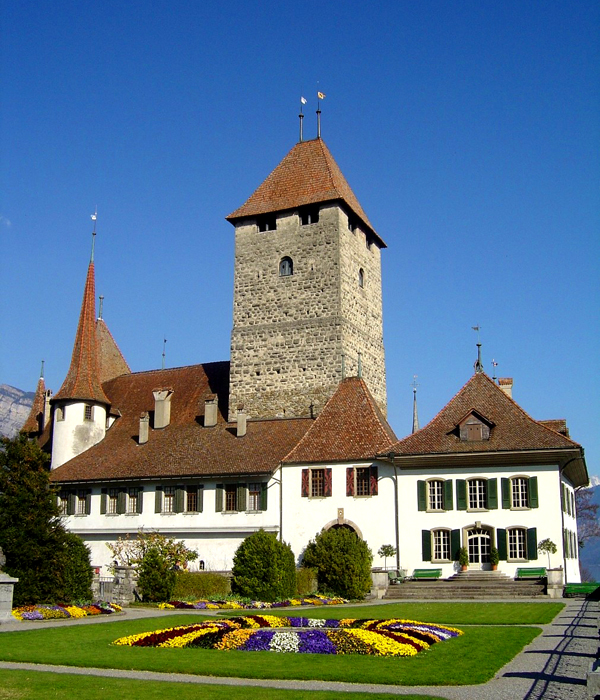

- Location within Switzerland
- 46°41′20.95″N 7°41′14.56″E
- Location: Spiez

History
- Built: 933
- Rebuilt: 15th to 18th centuries

Site notes
- Height: 39 m (128 ft)

Swiss Cultural Property of National Significance

Spiez Castle (German: Schloss Spiez) is a castle in the municipality of Spiez of the Swiss canton of Bern. It is a Swiss heritage site of national significance.

== History ==
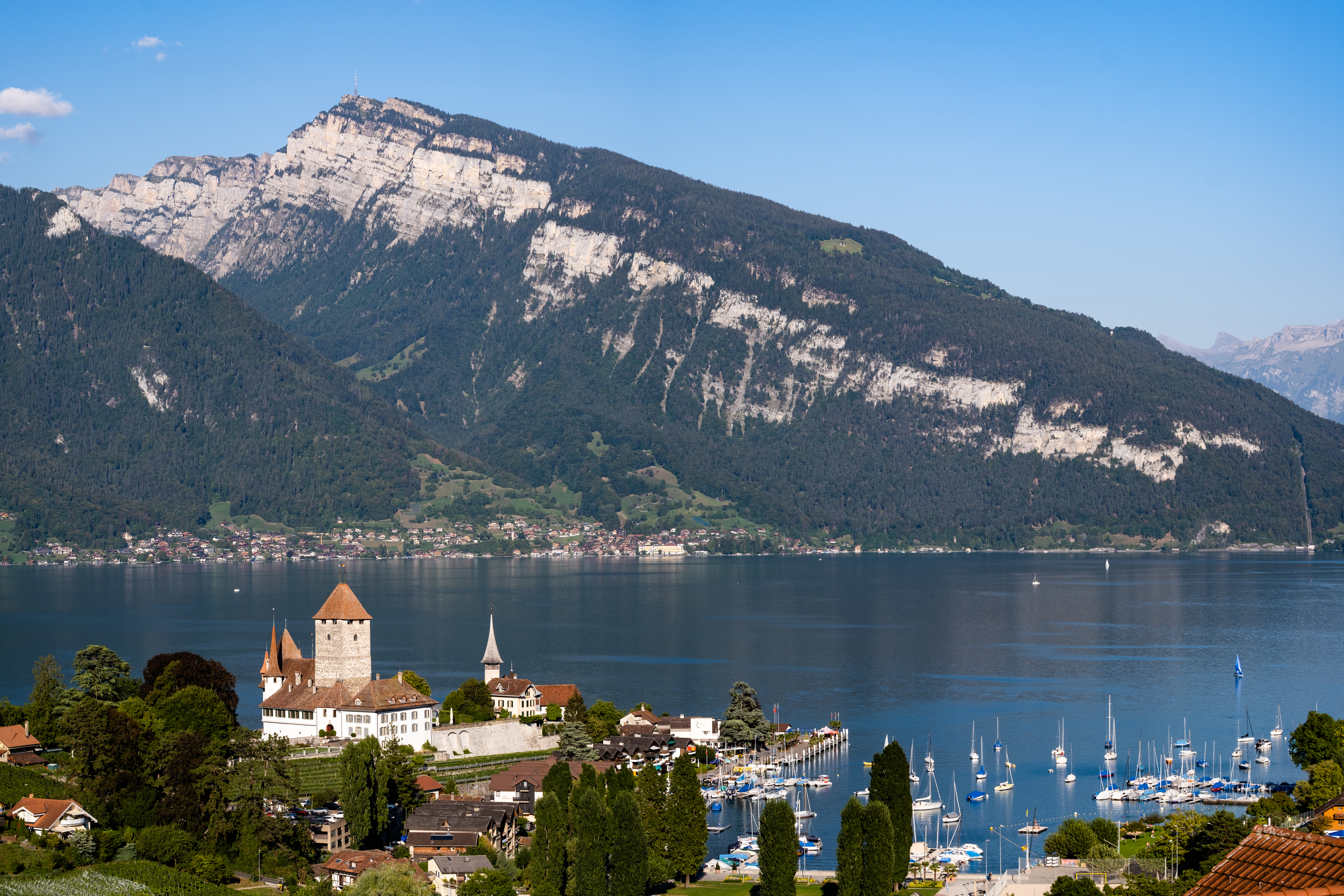
Spiez Castle and Lake Thun

According to Elogius Kiburger, the author of the Strättliger Chronicle, in 933 the King of Burgundy, Rudolph II, built the castle. Shortly thereafter, the Freiherr von Strättligen settled in the castle. Portions of the current castle curtain walls and main tower were built during the 12th century and by the 13th century, the town of Spiez existed outside the castle walls. By 1280 the castle was listed as an Imperial fief under Vogt Richard de Corbières. In 1289 the Freiherr von Strättligen was co-owner of the castle along with a succession of other noble families. In 1308 King Albert I of Habsburg was murdered at Windisch on the Reuss, by his nephew Duke John Parricida. As part of their retaliation for the murder, the Habsburgs withdrew half of the Spiez fief from Thüring von Brandis and granted the whole fief to Johannes von Strättligen. Thirty years later, in 1338, Johannes sold the castle, town, church, and surrounding villages to Johann II von Bubenberg who was the Schultheiss of Bern. By 1340, the Bubenberg-appointed vogt took orders from Bern but was obligated to raise troops for the Habsburgs. As Bern was de facto independent from their former overlords, the Habsburgs, this created an unstable situation that remained for over 40 years. After the Bernese and Swiss Confederation victory over the Habsburgs in the Battle of Sempach in 1386, the Habsburgs gave up their land claims west of the Aare, which included Spiez.

The castle and surrounding land remained with the Bubenberg family until their extinction in 1506 when it was acquired by Ludwig von Diesbach. Von Diesbach held it for ten years before Ludwig von Erlach acquired the castle and lands. The von Erlach family ruled the town and villages until the 1798 French invasion. After the invasion and the creation of the Helvetic Republic, the von Erlach family lost their land rights and jurisdiction over the village but retained ownership of the castle until 1875.

The old castle was expanded in several stages during the Late Middle Ages but little is known about the specific dates or what was changed. In 1600 the great hall and the northern buildings were expanded and renovated. During the 17th and 18th centuries the south "New Castle" was built and then expanded and redecorated in the late Baroque style. The castle was surrounded by gardens, vineyards, and forests. After 1875, the castle passed through several owners until a foundation bought the castle and associated church. The gardens are now open to the public and the castle rooms are used for conferences, concerts, exhibitions, and other events.

== Construction ==
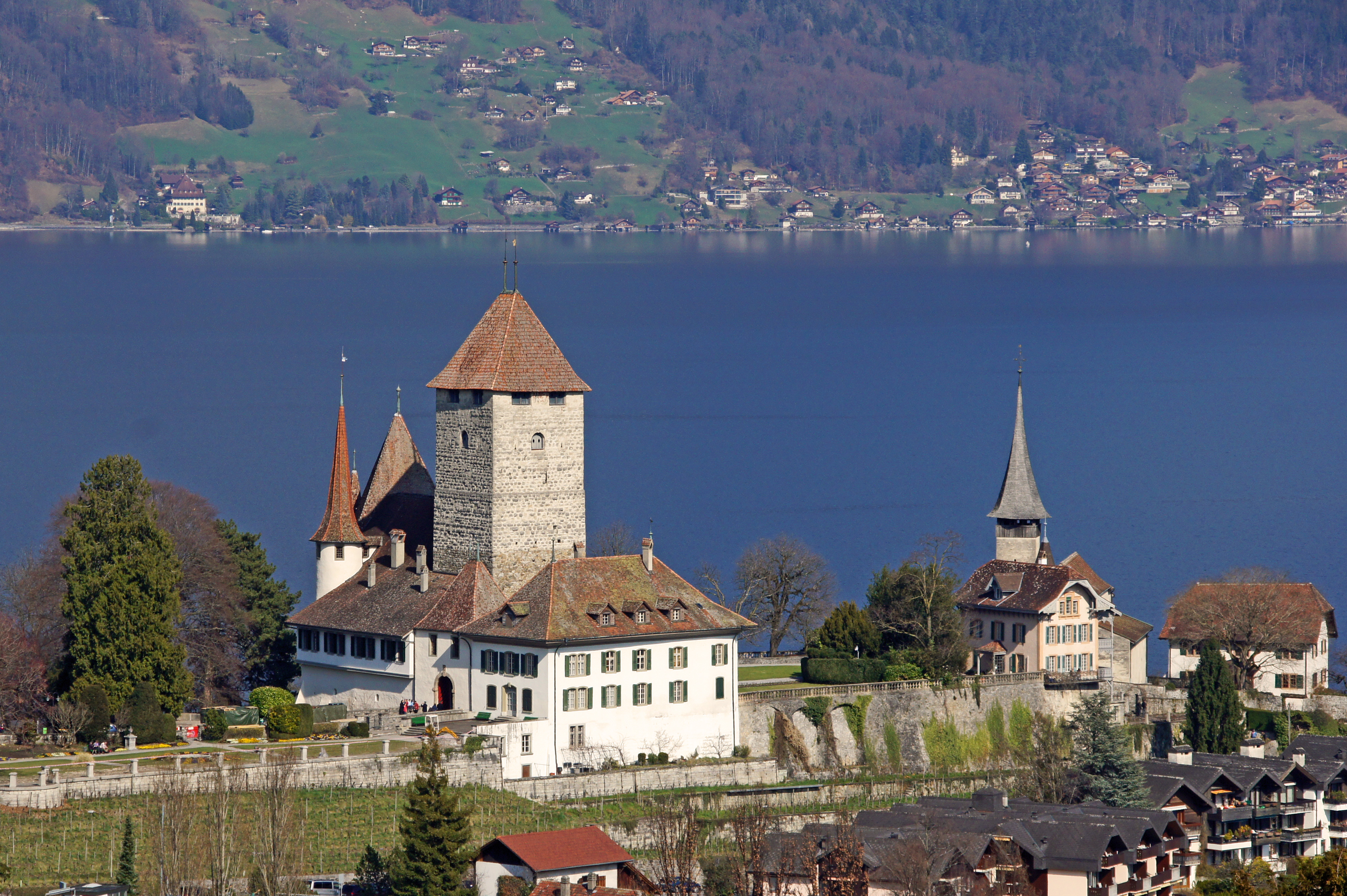
Spiez Castle and neighboring castle church

The massive square keep was built around 1200. The lower walls are about 3 m (9.8 ft) thick though they become thinner higher up. At the bottom it is 11.3 m × 11.2 m (37 ft × 37 ft). The tower increased in height several times over the following centuries before the final construction phase in 1600. In this final phase the tower was raised and crowned with hipped roof that brought its total height to 39 meters (128 ft).

The keep was originally surrounded by several free-standing wooden buildings. Over the following centuries, these buildings were replaced with a stone curtain wall and a ring of two concentric ditches. A gatehouse was built adjacent to the keep, which opened toward the west.

Around 1300 a residence wing was added north of the keep. It was probably lower at that time than it is today and was connected to the keep by a wooden gallery. During the second half of the 13th century, several tournaments must have been held around the castle because the visiting knights carved graffiti into the plaster of the main chimney. In the 14th century an additional north wing was added onto the residence wing.

From the 15th to the 18th century, the castle was gradually renovated to its present appearance. The gallery was expanded, and another story was added to the residence hall. The Trüel was added to the northwest side of the keep in the 16th century. Then, in the 17th and 18th centuries, the Baroque "New Castle" was built on the south side of the gatehouse.

== See also ==
- List of castles in Switzerland
