= Spiez =

- Municipality
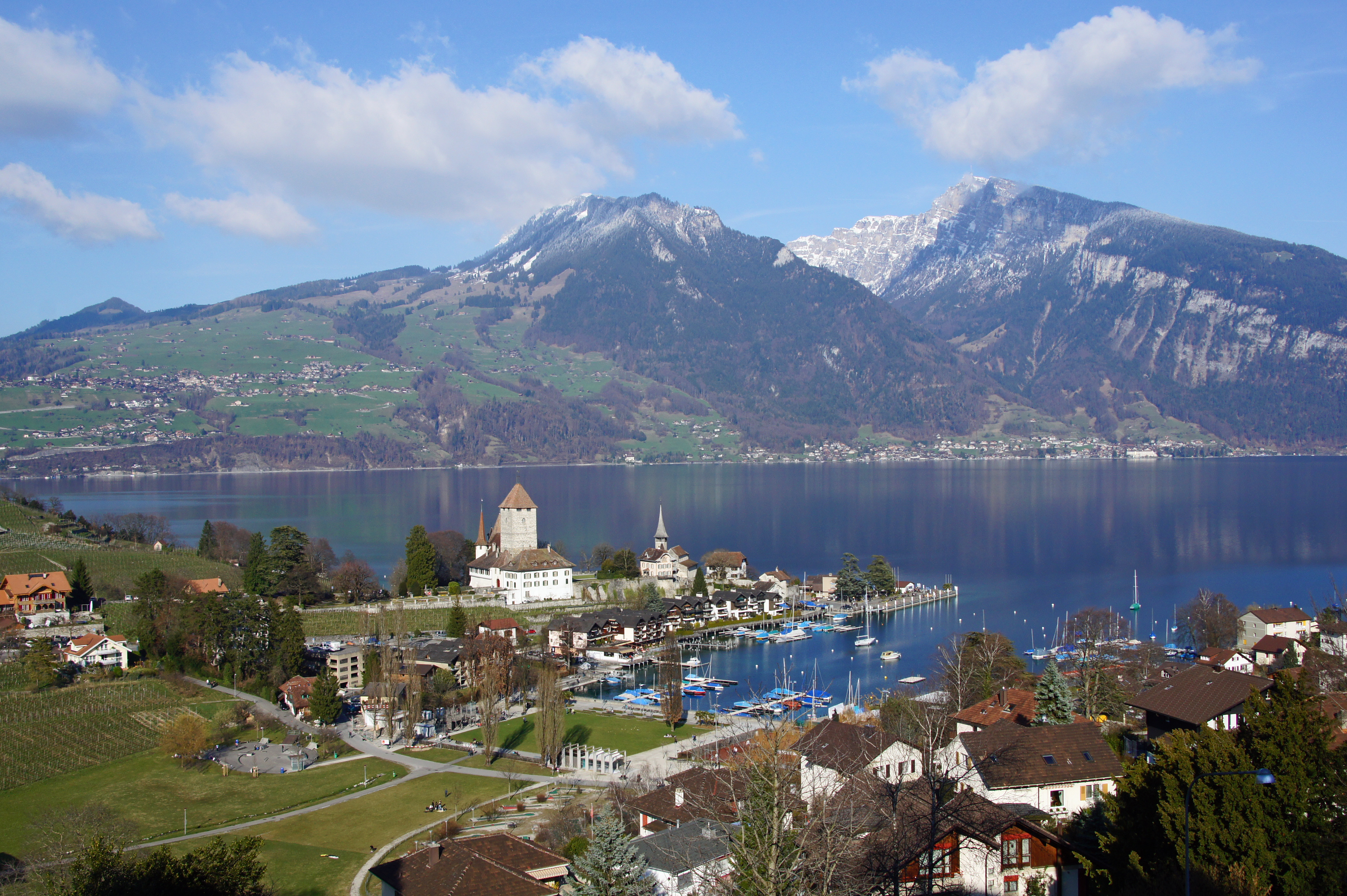

- Flag Coat of arms
- Location of Spiez
- Location within Switzerland Location within Canton of Bern
- Coordinates: 46°41′N 7°40′E
- Country: Switzerland
- Canton: Bern
- District: Frutigen-Niedersimmental

Government
  - Executive: Gemeinderat with 7 members
  - Mayor: Gemeindepräsident(in); Jolanda Brunner-Zwiebel SVP/UDC (as of 2026)
  - Parliament: Grosser Gemeinderat with 36 members

Area
  - Total: 16.78 km^{2} (6.48 sq mi)
- Elevation (Railway station): 628 m (2,060 ft)

Population (December 2020)
  - Total: 12,926
  - Density: 770.3/km^{2} (1,995/sq mi)
- Time zone: UTC+01:00 (CET)
  - Summer (DST): UTC+02:00 (CEST)
- Postal code: 3700
- SFOS number: 768
- ISO 3166 code: CH-BE
- Localities: Einigen, Hondrich, Faulensee, and Spiezwiler
- Surrounded by: Aeschi bei Spiez, Hilterfingen, Krattigen, Oberhofen am Thunersee, Reutigen, Sigriswil, Thun, Wimmis, Zwieselberg
- Website: https://www.spiez.ch/

Spiez (German pronunciation: ['ʃpiət͡s]) is a town and municipality on the shore of Lake Thun in the Bernese Oberland region of the Swiss canton of Bern. It is part of the Frutigen-Niedersimmental administrative district. Besides the town of Spiez, the municipality also includes the settlements of Einigen, Hondrich, Faulensee, and Spiezwiler.

== History ==
Spiez is first mentioned around 761–62 as Spiets.

The area between the Kander and Lake Thun in modern Spiez was home to several large Bronze and Iron Age settlements. Three separate Bronze Age cemeteries with numerous graves contained a wealth of bronze axes, knives and cloak pins from 1750 to 1500 BC. On a nearby hill, the Bürg site is slightly younger and contained knives, arrow and spear heads, a horse's bridle and a razor. The Eggli hill top was apparently a religious site during the Bronze and Iron Ages. The center of the religious site was a granite block surrounded by ash from fires and thousands of shattered ceramic fragments. The Eggli site was probably used from about 1500 until 500 BC. Celtic graves from the 4th to 2nd century BC contained gold, amber and glass ornaments which were imported from over the Alps. A rare funerary urn was buried at Faulensee during the 1st century BC.

During the Roman era there was no permanent settlement in the area, but some Roman coins and Roman graves have been discovered. After the fall of the Western Roman Empire and into the Early Middle Ages the Spiez area was home to several scattered settlements. According to Elogius Kiburger, the author of the Strättliger Chronicle, in 933 the King of Burgundy, Rudolph II, built Spiez Castle. Shortly thereafter, the Freiherr von Strättligen settled in the castle. Portions of the current castle shield walls and main tower were built during the 12th century and by the 13th century the town of Spiez existed outside the castle walls. By 1280 the castle was listed as an Imperial fief under Vogt Richard von Corbières. In 1289 the Freiherr von Strättligen was co-owner of the castle along with a succession of other noble families. In 1308 King Albert I of Habsburg was murdered at Windisch on the Reuss, by his nephew Duke John Parricida. As part of their retaliation for the murder, the Habsburgs withdrew half of the Spiez fief from Thüring von Brandis and granted the whole fief to Johannes von Strättligen. Thirty years later, in 1338, Johannes sold the castle, town, church and surrounding villages to Johann II von Bubenberg who was the Schultheiss of Bern. By 1340, the Bubenberg appointed vogt took orders from Bern, but was obligated to raise troops for the Habsburgs. As Bern was de facto independent from their former overlords, the Habsburgs, this created an unstable situation which remained for over 40 years. After the Bernese and Swiss Confederation victory over the Habsburgs in the Battle of Sempach in 1386, the Habsburgs gave up their land claims west of the Aare, which included Spiez.

The former Church of St. Laurentius, next to the castle, was first mentioned in 761–62, when the patronage rights over the church were given to Ettenheim Monastery in Breisgau. The church was one of the twelve Lake Thun churches in the Strättliger Chronicle. The current early Romanesque building was built during the 7th or 8th century, while the crypt dates from about 1000. Outside the church, a number of graves from the 7th and 8th centuries have also been discovered. It was the parish church for a parish that included Spiez, Spiezwiler, Einigen, Faulensee and Hondrich. When Bern adopted the new faith of the Protestant Reformation in 1528, the church became the center of the new Reformed parish.

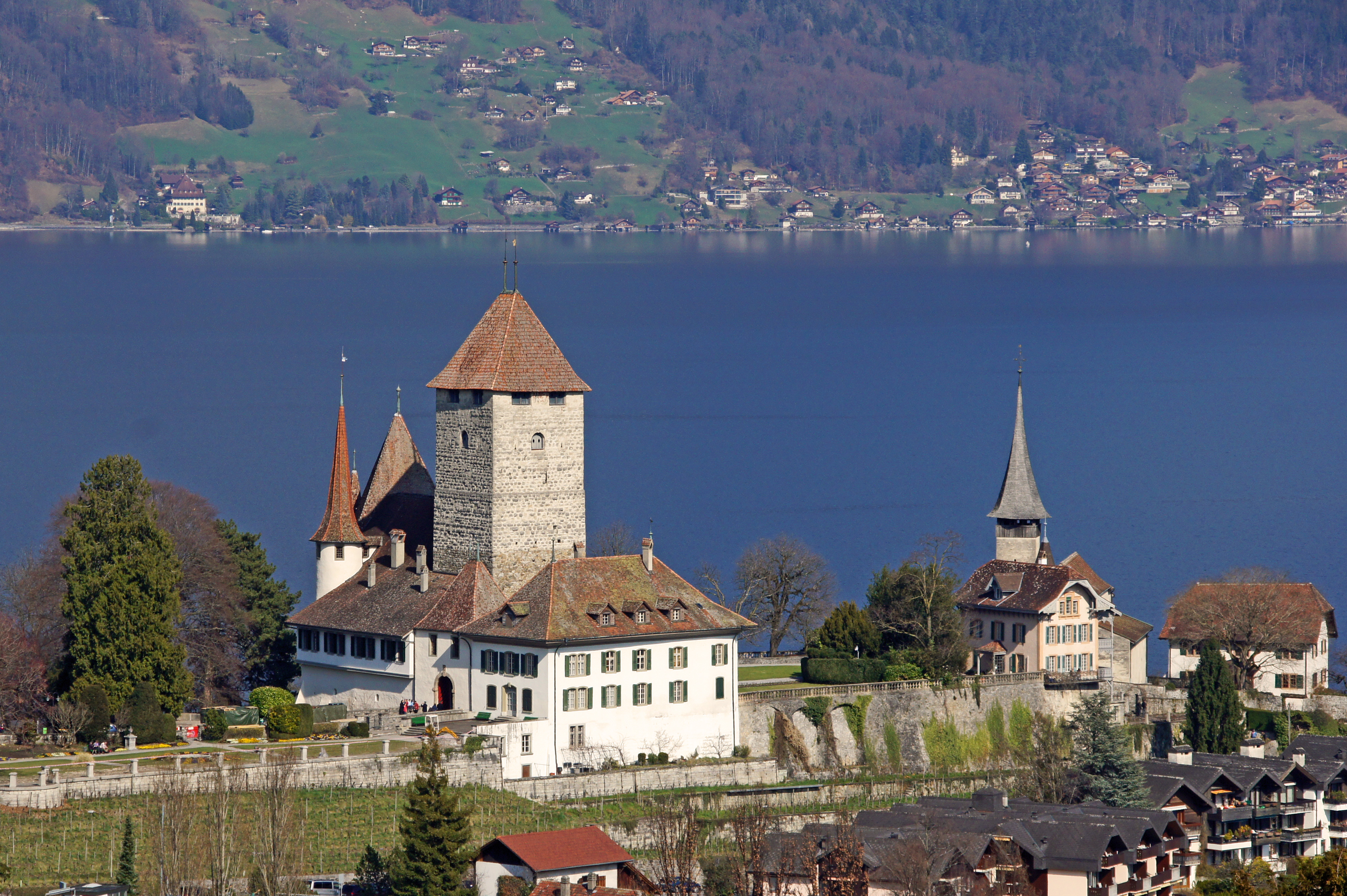
Spiez castle and church

The castle and surrounding land remained with the Bubenberg family until their extinction in 1506, when it was acquired by Ludwig von Diesbach. Von Diesbach held it for ten years before Ludwig von Erlach acquired the castle and lands. The von Erlach family ruled the town and villages until the 1798 French invasion.

The town charter was first documented in 1406, however there were citizens of Spiez with some codified rights as far back as 1312. A town wall was built early in Spiez's history. However, it fell into disrepair and was destroyed in a fire in 1600. Over time the surrounding villages came to be included in the town charter and their residents became citizens of Spiez. After the 1798 French invasion and the creation of the Helvetic Republic, the von Erlach family lost their land rights and jurisdiction over the village, but retained ownership of the castle until 1875.

Aerial view from 200 m by Walter Mittelholzer (1919)

Historically the residents of Spiez and the surrounding villages raised orchards and vineyards on along the lake, fished in the lake and shipped goods along the lake or raised crops in the valleys. The vineyards of Spiez were first mentioned in 1338 and remained in operation until an outbreak of disease destroyed the plants in 1900. An attempt in 1927 to restart the wine industry on Spiez mountain and at Faulensee was fairly successful. The villages along the Kander were often threatened by flooding, until the Kander was diverted into the lake in 1711–13. The construction of the Lake Thun road in 1844 and steam ship docks in 1835, 1876 and 1926 helped open the town to the rest of the country. Due to the mild climate and transportation links, Spiez became a popular health and spa town in the 19th century. Beginning in 1856 resorts and hotels, including the Schonegg, Spiezerhof and Faulensee-Bad, opened along the lake shore. The Thun-Spiez-Interlaken (1893), Spiez-Zweisimmen-Montreux (1897–1905) and Spiez-Frutigen-Lötschberg-Simplon (1901–13) railroads all helped the tourist industry and the rest of the town to grow. The growing population led to the construction of a secondary school and seven primary schools around the municipality. In the 1980s the A6 and A8 motorways further connected Spiez and the surrounding villages. In 1990 the Kander Tunnel opened, which helped reduce noise and pollution in the municipality.

== Geography ==
Aerial views of Spiez.

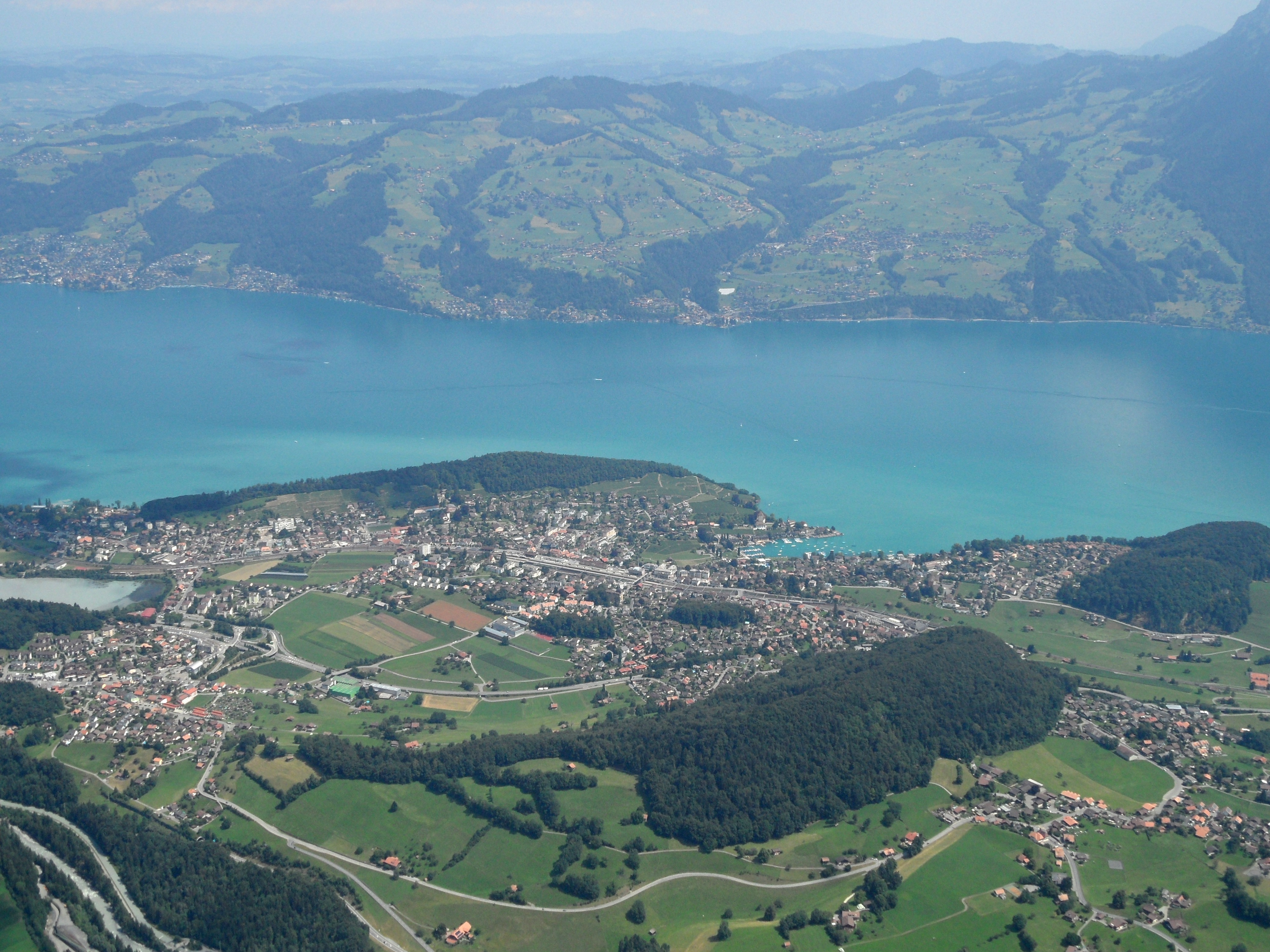
Spiez from the air, with the lake in the background and the Kander bottom left

Spiez is located on the south shore of Lake Thun, stretching along a ridge that separates the lake front from the Kander that runs parallel and to the south. From its lowest point on the lake, at 558 m (1,831 ft) above sea level, it reaches a height of 852 m (2,795 ft) on the ridge at Hondrichhügel.

The municipality comprises five villages (Bäuerte): Spiez, Einigen, Hondrich, Faulensee and Spiezwiler (formerly Wyler). It has an area of 16.69 km^{2} (6.44 sq mi). As of 2012, a total of 6.01 km^{2} (2.32 mi^{2}) or 36.0% is used for agricultural purposes, while 4.99 km^{2} (1.93 mi^{2}) or 29.9% is forested. The rest of the municipality is 5.27 km^{2} (2.03 mi^{2}) or 31.6% is settled (buildings or roads), 0.34 km^{2} (0.13 mi^{2}) or 2.0% is either rivers or lakes and 0.15 km^{2} (37 acres) or 0.9% is unproductive land.

During the same year, industrial buildings made up 2.6% of the total area while housing and buildings made up 17.3% and transportation infrastructure made up 9.5%. while parks, green belts and sports fields made up 1.4%. A total of 28.8% of the total land area is heavily forested and 1.1% is covered with orchards or small clusters of trees. Of the agricultural land, 5.5% is used for growing crops and 28.0% is pasturage, while 2.6% is used for orchards or vine crops. Of the water in the municipality, 1.0% is in lakes and 1.0% is in rivers and streams.

On 31 December 2009 Amtsbezirk Niedersimmental, the municipality's former district, was dissolved. On the following day, 1 January 2010, it joined the newly created Verwaltungskreis Frutigen-Niedersimmental.

== Coat of arms ==
The blazon of the municipal coat of arms is Argent three Piles Azure issuing from the base.

== Demographics ==
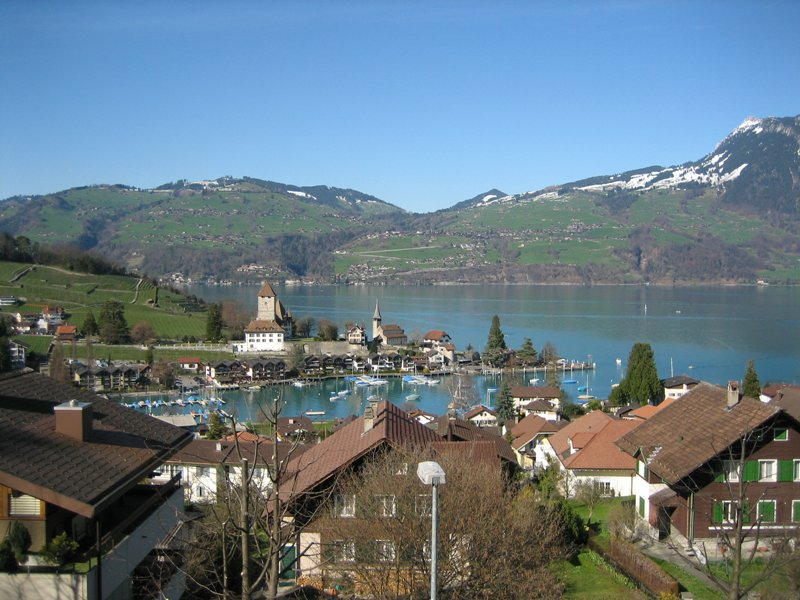
Spiez town in 2006

Spiez has a population (as of December 2020) of 12,926. As of 2010, 8.4% of the population are resident foreign nationals. Over the last 10 years (2001–2011) the population has changed at a rate of -0.5%. Migration accounted for -0.7%, while births and deaths accounted for 0%.

Most of the population (as of 2000) speaks German (11,302 or 94.0%) as their first language, Serbo-Croatian is the second most common (135 or 1.1%) and French is the third (101 or 0.8%). There are 100 people who speak Italian and 5 people who speak Romansh.

As of 2008, the population was 48.5% male and 51.5% female. The population was made up of 5,521 Swiss men (44.3% of the population) and 533 (4.3%) non-Swiss men. There were 5,905 Swiss women (47.3%) and 516 (4.1%) non-Swiss women. Of the population in the municipality, 3,135 or about 26.1% were born in Spiez and lived there in 2000. There were 5,220 or 43.4% who were born in the same canton, while 2,014 or 16.7% were born somewhere else in Switzerland, and 1,198 or 10.0% were born outside of Switzerland.

As of 2011, children and teenagers (0–19 years old) make up 18.8% of the population, while adults (20–64 years old) make up 59.2% and seniors (over 64 years old) make up 22%.

As of 2000, there were 4,678 people who were single and never married in the municipality. There were 5,862 married individuals, 840 widows or widowers and 647 individuals who are divorced.

As of 2010, there were 1,924 households that consist of only one person and 275 households with five or more people. In 2000, a total of 5,109 apartments (83.7% of the total) were permanently occupied, while 795 apartments (13.0%) were seasonally occupied and 200 apartments (3.3%) were empty. As of 2010, the construction rate of new housing units was 2 new units per 1000 residents. The vacancy rate for the municipality, in 2012, was 0.51%. In 2011, single family homes made up 52.3% of the total housing in the municipality.

The historical population is given in the following chart:

== Sights ==
The medieval castle in the town dates from the 15th and 16th Centuries. Visitors can visit the grand halls within the castle, including the Baroque banquet hall built in 1614.

The Hotel Belvédère in Spiez accommodated the Germany national football team during the 1954 FIFA World Cup held in Switzerland. "The Spirit of Spiez", developed there among the players, is regarded as important factor that helped the German team to win the world championship.

== Heritage sites of national significance ==
The Bürg archeological site with prehistoric and medieval settlement ruins, the Swiss Reformed castle church, Spiez Castle and the Weinbauernhof are listed as Swiss heritage site of national significance.

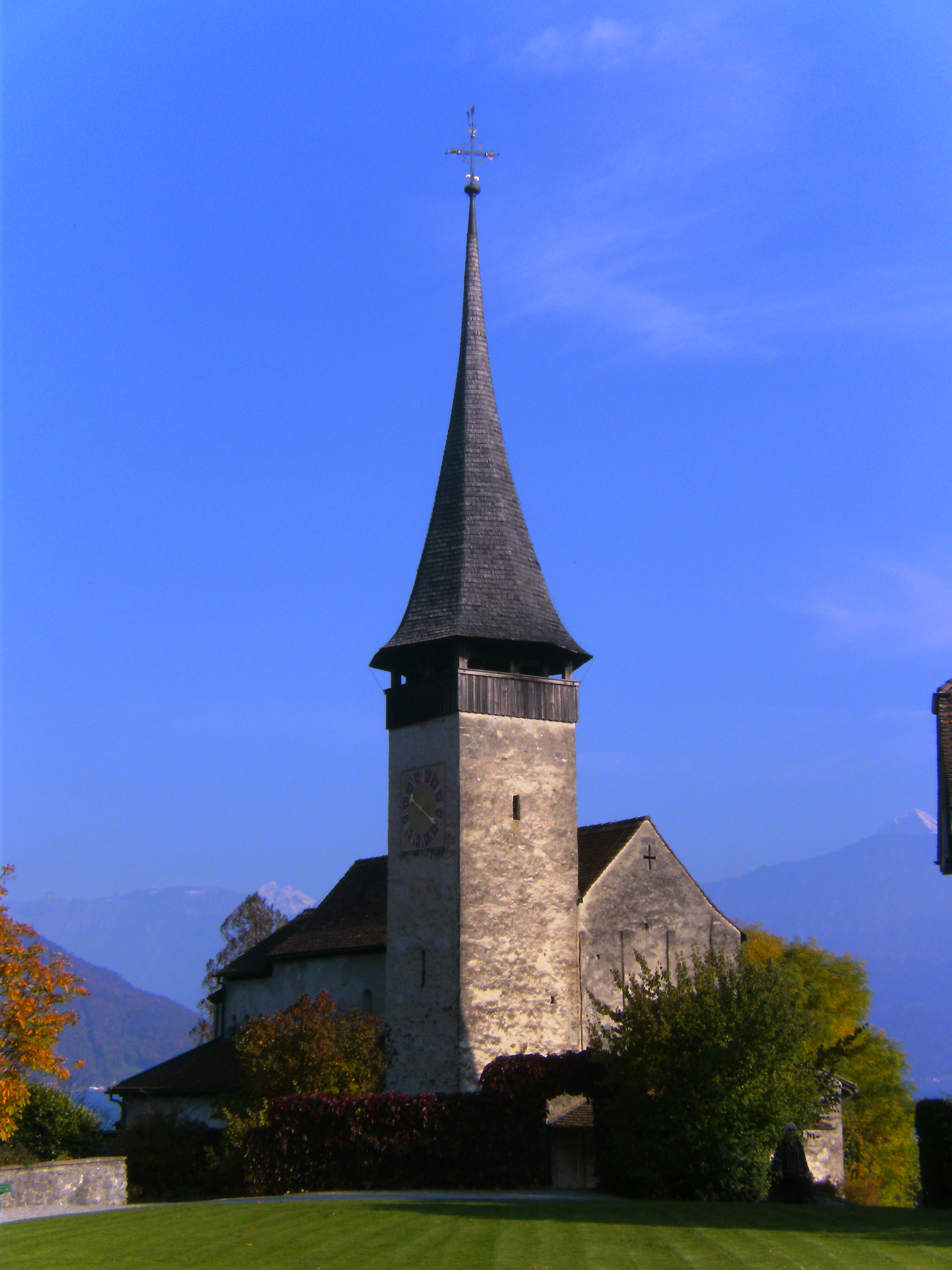
Swiss Reformed Castle Church

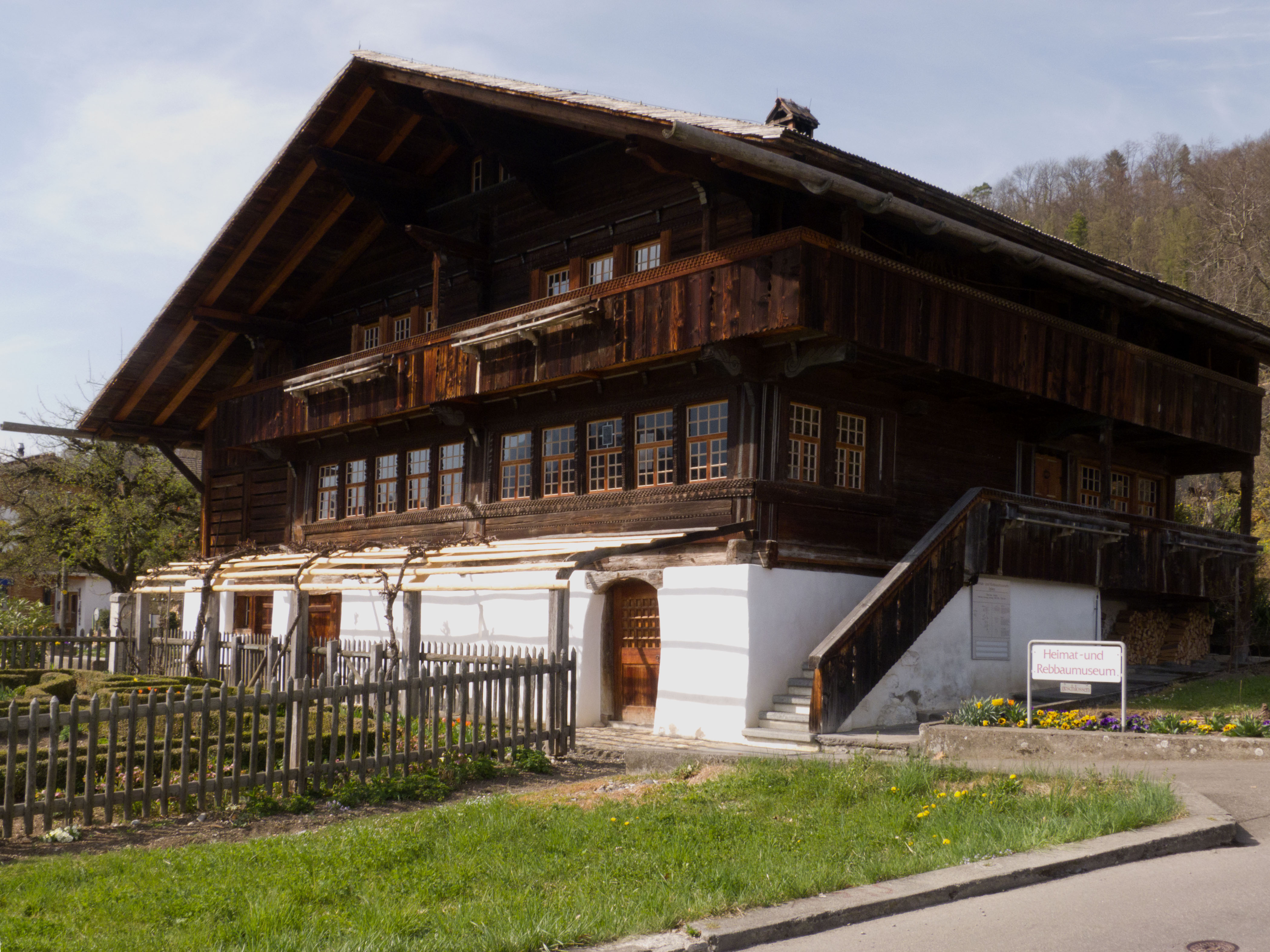
Weinbauernhof

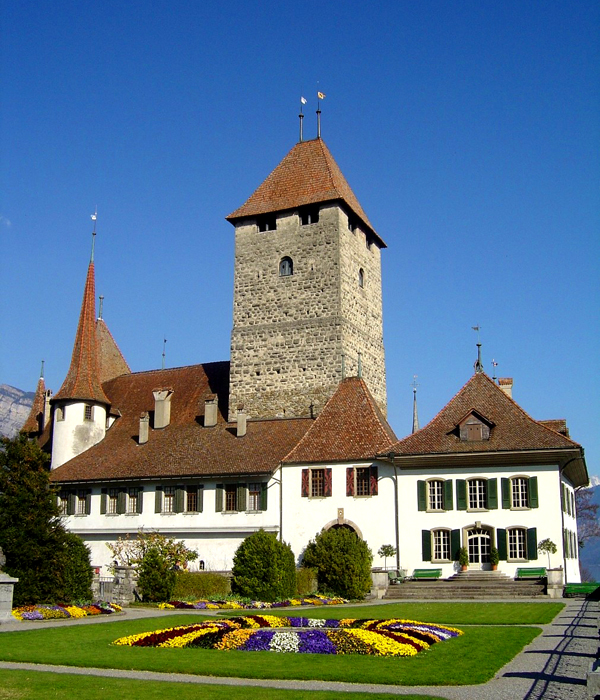
Spiez Castle. Parts of the central tower were built around 933

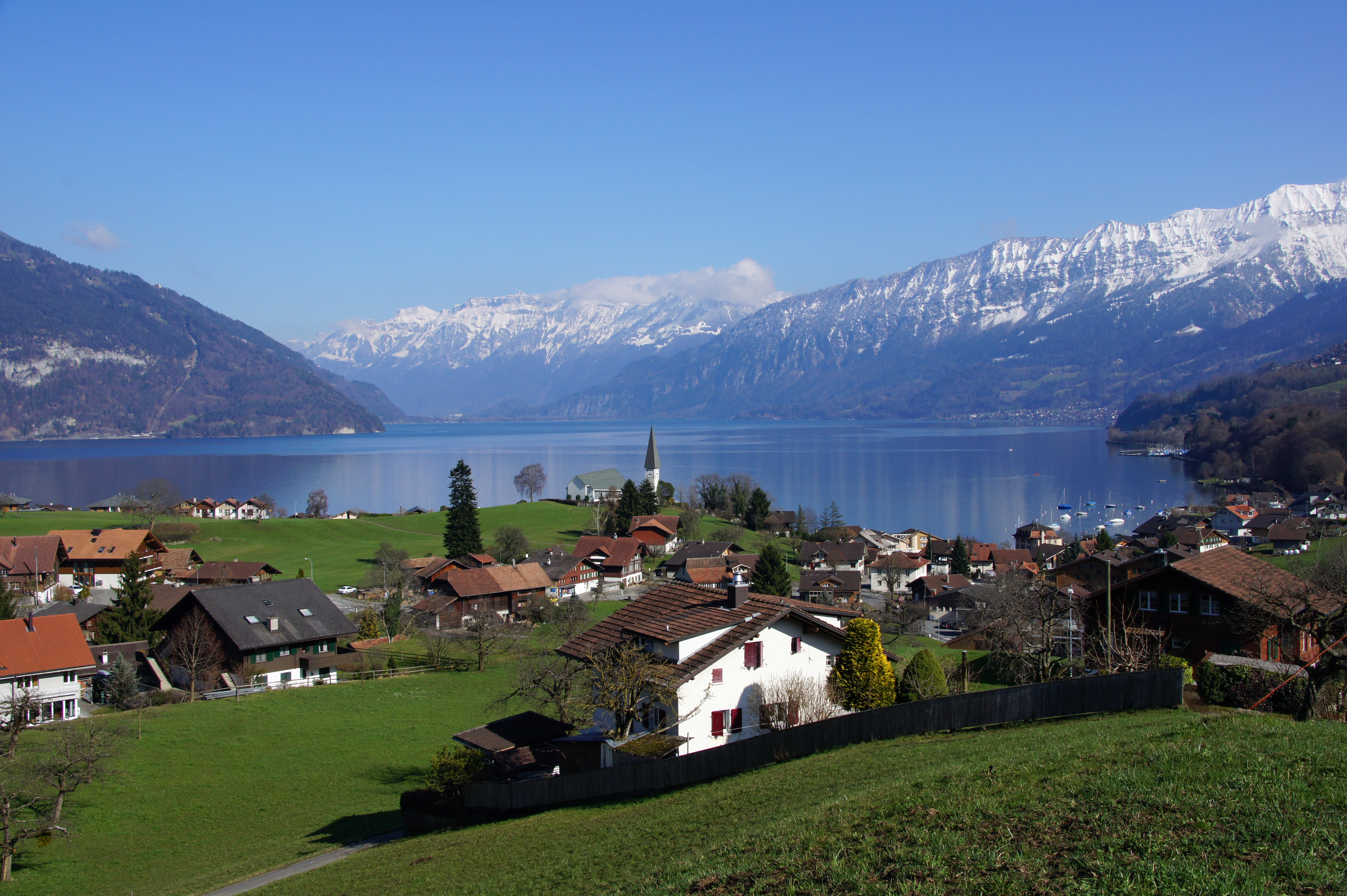
Faulensee village in Spiez municipality

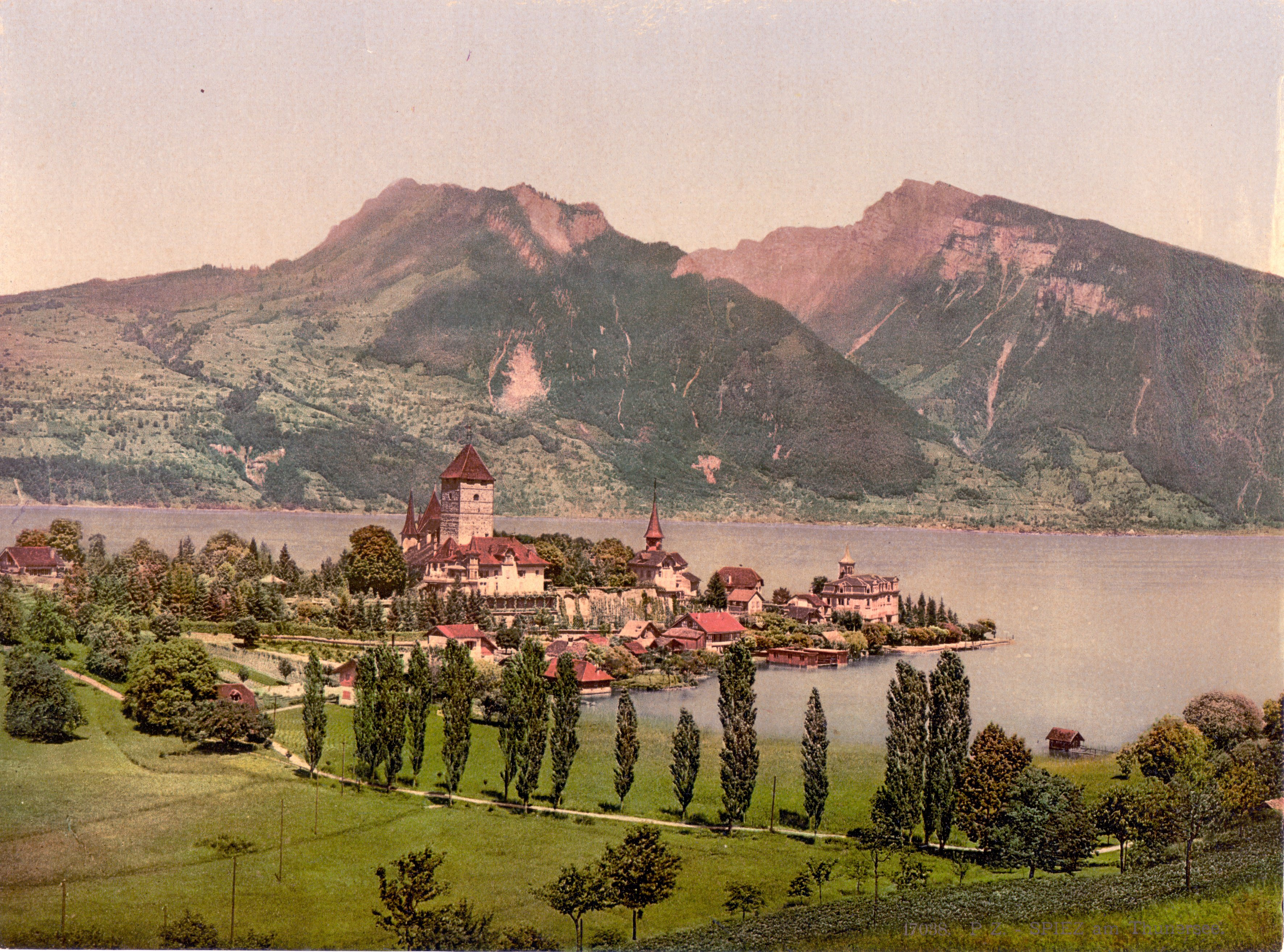
Spiez harbour and Lake Thun (ca. 1900)

== Politics ==
In the 2011 federal election the most popular party was the Swiss People's Party (SVP) which received 26% of the vote. The next three most popular parties were the Social Democratic Party (SP) (18.3%), the Conservative Democratic Party (BDP) (16.7%) and the FDP.The Liberals (8.1%). In the federal election, a total of 5,127 votes were cast, and the voter turnout was 53.3%.

== Economy ==
As of 2011, Spiez had an unemployment rate of 1.37%. As of 2008, there were a total of 4,649 people employed in the municipality. Of these, there were 155 people employed in the primary economic sector and about 48 businesses involved in this sector. 1,220 people were employed in the secondary sector and there were 95 businesses in this sector. 3,274 people were employed in the tertiary sector, with 399 businesses in this sector. There were 5,928 residents of the municipality who were employed in some capacity, of which females made up 43.3% of the workforce.

In 2008 there were a total of 3,768 full-time equivalent jobs. The number of jobs in the primary sector was 92, of which 87 were in agriculture, 3 were in forestry or lumber production and 2 were in fishing or fisheries. The number of jobs in the secondary sector was 1,148 of which 657 or (57.2%) were in manufacturing, 3 or (0.3%) were in mining and 357 (31.1%) were in construction. The number of jobs in the tertiary sector was 2,528. In the tertiary sector; 411 or 16.3% were in wholesale or retail sales or the repair of motor vehicles, 283 or 11.2% were in the movement and storage of goods, 376 or 14.9% were in a hotel or restaurant, 32 or 1.3% were in the information industry, 85 or 3.4% were the insurance or financial industry, 196 or 7.8% were technical professionals or scientists, 163 or 6.4% were in education and 487 or 19.3% were in health care.

In 2000, there were 2,387 workers who commuted into the municipality and 3,399 workers who commuted away. The municipality is a net exporter of workers, with about 1.4 workers leaving the municipality for every one entering. A total of 2,529 workers (51.4% of the 4,916 total workers in the municipality) both lived and worked in Spiez. Of the working population, 23% used public transportation to get to work, and 47.2% used a private car.

In 2011 the average local and cantonal tax rate on a married resident, with two children, of Spiez making 150,000 CHF was 12.4%, while an unmarried resident's rate was 18.3%. For comparison, the average rate for the entire canton in the same year, was 14.2% and 22.0%, while the nationwide average was 12.3% and 21.1% respectively. In 2009 there were a total of 5,701 tax payers in the municipality. Of that total, 1,986 made over 75,000 CHF per year. There were 39 people who made between 15,000 and 20,000 per year. The average income of the over 75,000 CHF group in Spiez was 114,437 CHF, while the average across all of Switzerland was 130,478 CHF.

In 2011 a total of 4.0% of the population received direct financial assistance from the government.

== Religion ==
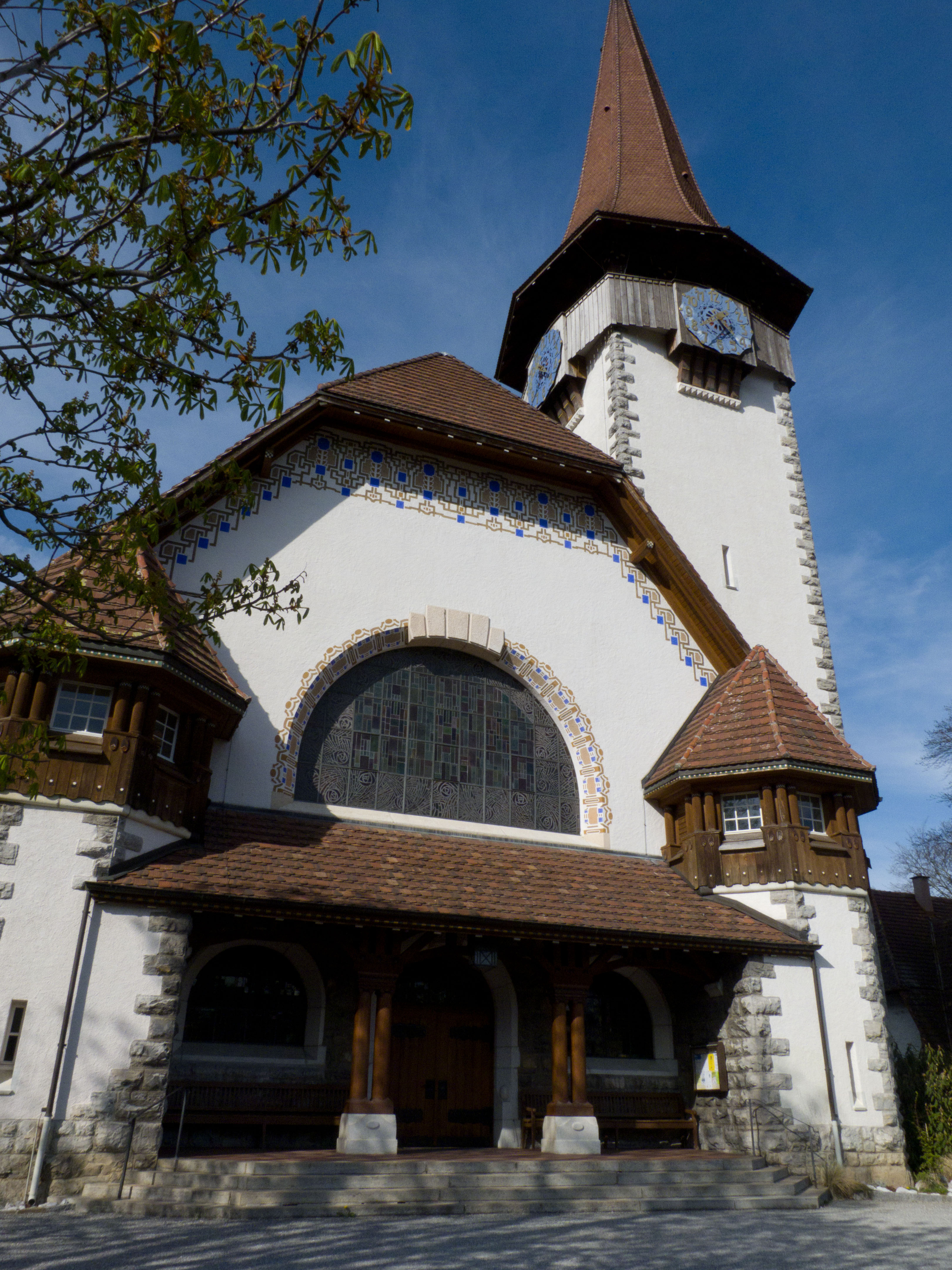
The new Reformed church in Spiez

From the 2000 census, 8,504 or 70.7% belonged to the Swiss Reformed Church, while 1,516 or 12.6% were Roman Catholic. Of the rest of the population, there were 150 members of an Orthodox church (or about 1.25% of the population), there were 14 individuals (or about 0.12% of the population) who belonged to the Christian Catholic Church, and there were 518 individuals (or about 4.31% of the population) who belonged to another Christian church. There were 3 individuals (or about 0.02% of the population) who were Jewish, and 203 (or about 1.69% of the population) who were Muslim. There were 14 individuals who were Buddhist, 63 individuals who were Hindu and 7 individuals who belonged to another church. 694 (or about 5.77% of the population) belonged to no church, are agnostic or atheist, and 341 individuals (or about 2.84% of the population) did not answer the question.

== Education ==
In Spiez about 58.7% of the population have completed non-mandatory upper secondary education, and 19.2% have completed additional higher education (either a university or a Fachhochschule). Of the 1,474 who had completed some form of tertiary schooling listed in the census, 70.9% were Swiss men, 21.3% were Swiss women, 5.4% were non-Swiss men, and 2.4% were non-Swiss women.

The canton of Bern school system provides one year of non-obligatory kindergarten, followed by six years of primary school. This is followed by three years of obligatory lower secondary school, where the students are separated according to ability and aptitude. Following the lower secondary, students may attend additional schooling, or they may enter an apprenticeship.

During the 2011–12 school year, there were a total of 1,286 students attending classes in Spiez. There were 9 kindergarten classes with a total of 182 students in the municipality. Of the kindergarten students, 8.2% were permanent or temporary residents of Switzerland (not citizens), and 12.6% have a different mother language than the classroom language. The municipality had 35 primary classes and 630 students. Of the primary students, 9.4% were permanent or temporary residents of Switzerland (not citizens), and 13.7% have a different mother language than the classroom language. During the same year, there were 22 lower secondary classes with a total of 444 students. There were 9.0% who were permanent or temporary residents of Switzerland (not citizens), and 13.3% have a different mother language than the classroom language. The remainder of the students attend a private or special school.

As of 2000, there were a total of 1,779 students attending any school in the municipality. Of those, 1,291 both lived and attended school in the municipality, while 488 students came from another municipality. During the same year, 229 residents attended schools outside the municipality.

Spiez is home to a regional library which has (as of 2008) 20,276 books or other media, and loaned out 135,277 items in the same year. It was open a total of 304 days, with an average of 30 hours per week during that year.

== Crime ==
In 2014 the crime rate, of the over 200 crimes listed in the Swiss Criminal Code (running from murder, robbery and assault to accepting bribes and election fraud), in Spiez was 47.1 per thousand residents. This rate is only 72.9% of the average rate in the entire country. During the same period, the rate of drug crimes was 8 per thousand residents. This rate is about one and half times greater than the rate in the district, but due to a low rate in the rest of the district it is only 59.3% of the cantonal rate. The rate of violations of immigration, visa and work permit laws was 3.3 per thousand residents. This rate is about two and one-third times greater than the rate in the district, but is only 67.3% of the rate for the entire country.

== Transport ==
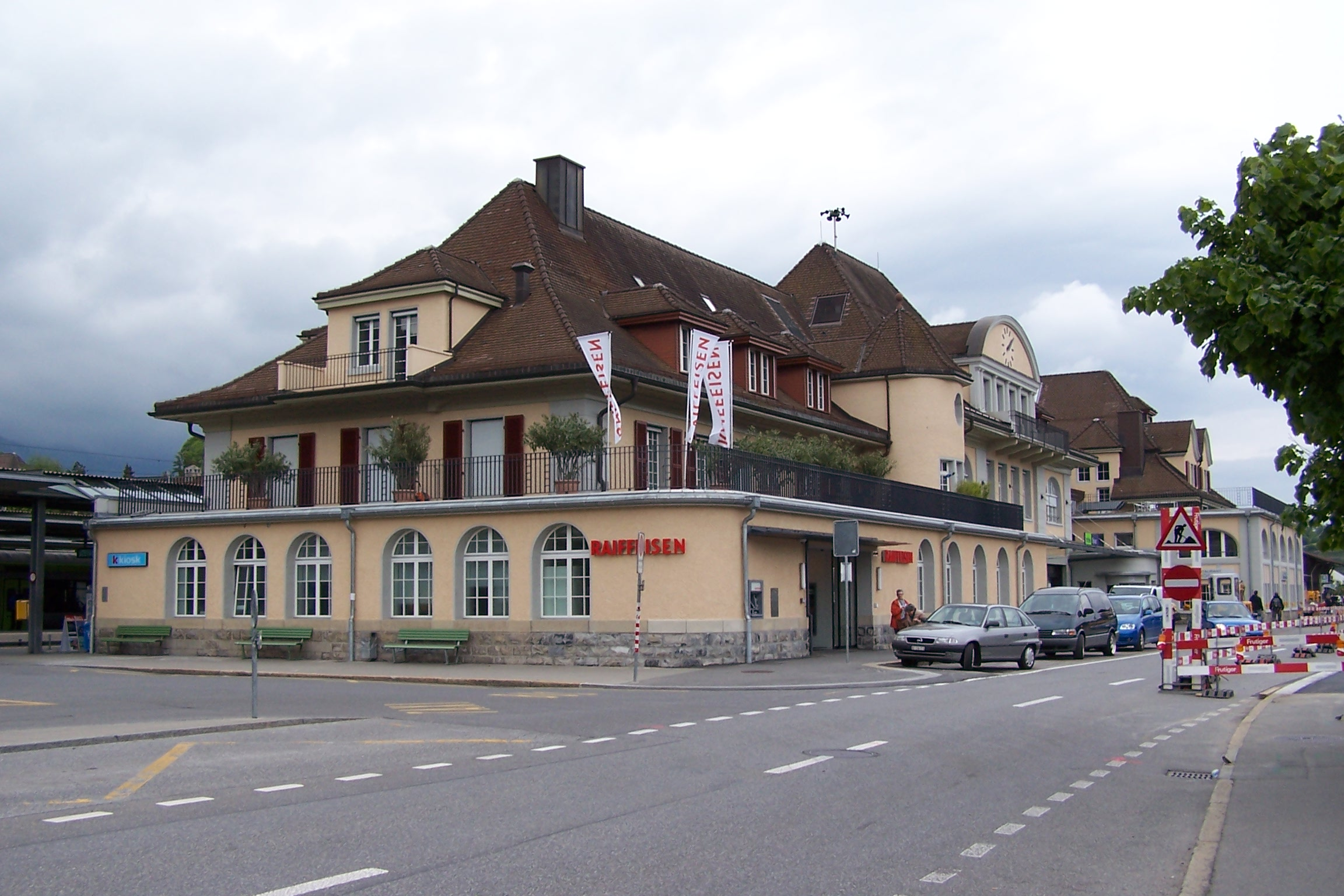
Spiez railway station

The municipality of Spiez is served by the Spiez railway station and the outlying station of Lattigen bei Spiez. Spiez is a major junction point of one of the two major north–south railway axis in Switzerland through the Alps: the Simplon line. Coming from Germany, Basel and Bern, the line further goes through two major Alps traversing tunnels, namely the Lötschberg Base Tunnel (35 km (22 mi), since 2007) to Brig in Valais with a totally distinct climate in just 35 minutes, and then further through the Simplon Tunnel (20 km (12 mi), 1906) to reach Italy, where it finally arrives at the major junction point of northern Italy: Milan. The old line through the since 1913 existing and 500 metres (1,600 ft) higher situated Lötschberg Tunnel (15 km (9.3 mi)) is still operating and a touristic highlight. The parts between Bern and Brig is operated by BLS AG (Lötschberg railway line), but also intensely served by SBB CFF FFS. The lines between Bern and Interlaken (Lake Thun railway line) is served by BLS, SBB, ICE, and TGV. BLS' Spiez–Erlenbach–Zweisimmen railway line is part of the Golden Pass Express between Lucerne and Montreux at Lake Geneva.

== Notable people ==
- Jakob Streit (1910–2009) a Swiss author, teacher and anthroposophist, born and died in Spiez.
- Maya Pedersen-Bieri (born 1972 in Spiez) a Swiss-Norwegian skeleton racer, won the gold medal in the women's skeleton event at the 2006 Winter Olympics
- Caroline Steffen (born 1978 in Spiez) a professional triathlete

== See also ==
- Spiez Laboratory
