= The Way to Santiago =

1940 novel

- First edition (US)
- Author: Arthur Calder-Marshall
- Language: English
- Genre: Thriller
- Publisher: Jonathan Cape (UK); Reynal & Hitchcock (US)
- Publication date: 1940
- Publication place: United Kingdom
- Media type: Print

The Way to Santiago is a 1940 thriller novel by the British writer Arthur Calder-Marshall. It revolves around the shooting of an American newspaperman in Mexico City, leading to the exposure of a Nazi-backed organisation to launch a coup against the Mexican government.

Orson Welles wrote a screenplay based on the novel, and planned to shoot it in Mexico with Dolores del Río in the female lead. However his studio RKO was unwilling to back the project.

== Bibliography ==
- Benamou, Catherine L. It’s All True: Orson Welles’s Pan-American Odyssey. University of California Press, 2007.
- McBride, Joseph. What Ever Happened to Orson Welles?: A Portrait of an Independent Career. University Press of Kentucky, 2014.
