= Echternacher Anzeiger =

- Language: German

Echternacher Anzeiger was a newspaper published in Luxembourg between 1863 and 1940.

The Echternacher Anzeiger started business on 10 May 1863. It was published twice a week in Echternach, first by Dominik Burg, later by his son Joseph Burg, then by the latter's son, also named Joseph Burg.

It had a small readership — in 1865 it sold about 160 copies — and mainly consisted of articles which had already been published elsewhere.

Over time, it developed the ambition to grow beyond its local basis, and even beyond the national borders, as evidenced by its byline: "a national newspaper. An organ for the Grand-Duchy of Luxembourg and the neighbouring areas".

Its publication ended on 31 December 1940.

== See also ==
- List of newspapers in Luxembourg
