= Mr. Westerby Missing =

1940 novel

- First edition (UK)
- Author: Cecil Street
- Language: English
- Series: Desmond Merrion
- Genre: Detective
- Publisher: Collins Crime Club (UK); Doubleday (US)
- Publication date: 1940
- Publication place: United Kingdom
- Media type: Print
- Preceded by: Murder in the Coalhole
- Followed by: Death Takes a Flat

Mr. Westerby Missing is a 1940 detective novel by the British writer Cecil Street, writing under the pen name of Miles Burton. It was the twenty-second in a series of books featuring the detective Desmond Merrion and Inspector Arnold of Scotland Yard. It was published in the United States by Doubleday the same year.

In The Observer Maurice Richardson considered it as "another of Mr. Burton’s sound patient investigations" while in his New York Times review Isaac Anderson noted "Miles Burton has written many good mystery stories, and this is one of his best".

== Synopsis ==
John Westerby, a keen ornithologist living in a peaceful village, goes missing one November evening with a large sum of money in his possession. The case perplexes Inspector Arnold who can't work out if Westerby has suffered an accident, committed suicide, has been murdered, or is still alive. As so often it takes the assistance of his friend Merrion to crack the case.

== Bibliography ==
- Evans, Curtis. Masters of the "Humdrum" Mystery: Cecil John Charles Street, Freeman Wills Crofts, Alfred Walter Stewart and the British Detective Novel, 1920-1961. McFarland, 2014.
- Herbert, Rosemary. Whodunit?: A Who's Who in Crime & Mystery Writing. Oxford University Press, 2003.
- Reilly, John M. Twentieth Century Crime & Mystery Writers. Springer, 2015.
