= Mario Levrero =

Uruguayan author (1940–2004)

- Born: Jorge Mario Varlotta Levrero; 23 January 1940; Montevideo, Uruguay
- Died: 30 August 2004 (aged 64)
- Occupation: Author

Jorge Mario Varlotta Levrero (23 January 1940 – 30 August 2004), better known as Mario Levrero, was a Uruguayan author. He authored nearly 20 novels as well as writing articles, columns, comic books and crosswords. His work is said to be influenced by Franz Kafka, Lewis Carroll and surrealism. Throughout his life he shunned publicity and was difficult with interviewers. Regardless, he became a cult figure in Uruguay and Argentina.

His writing was often branded as science fiction or genre fiction, a categorisation he strongly rejected. Critics have commented on the both sinister and humorous nature of his work.

== Biography ==
Levrero was born in Montevideo in 1940 to an Italian-Uruguayan family. He stopped attending school at age 14 due to a heart murmur and instead spent his time in bed, reading and listening to tango music.

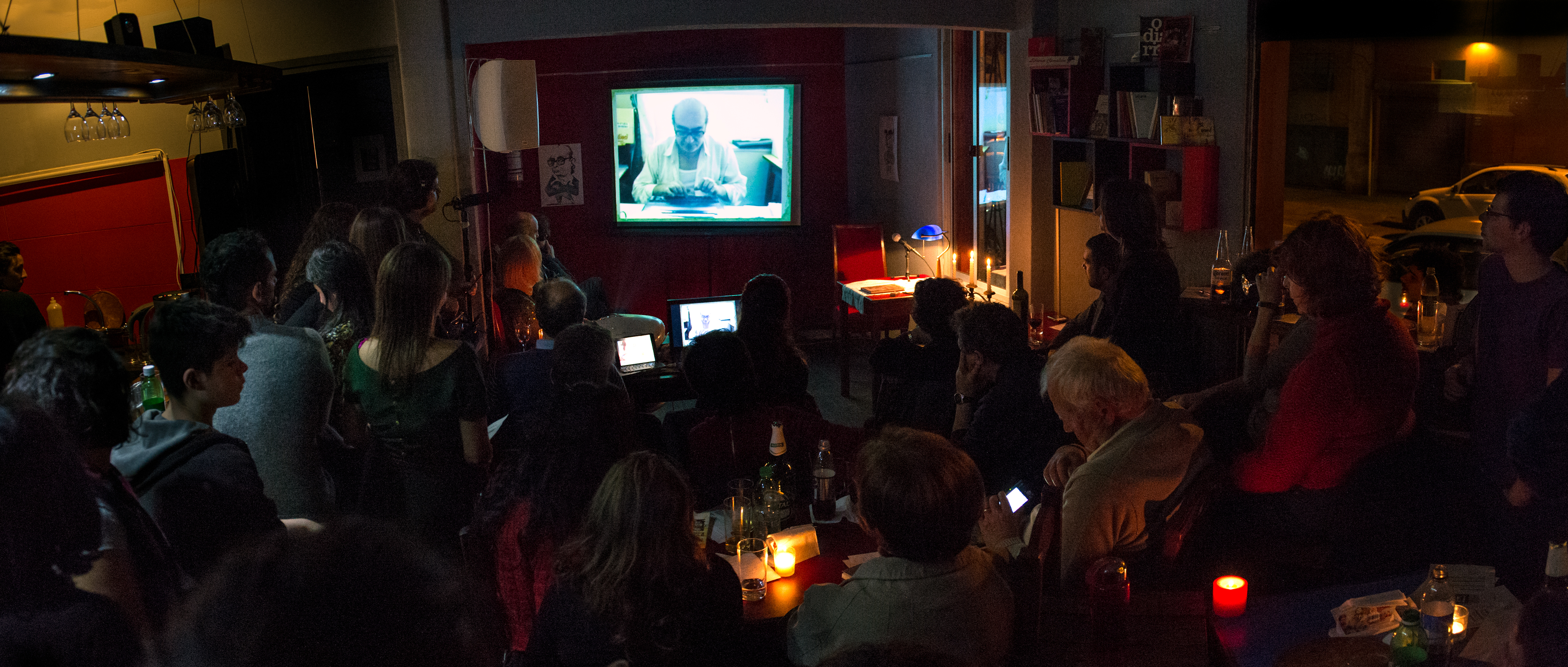
A memorial event for Mario Levrero in 2014

Having never finished school, he claimed that attending a tango club was his university. In his twenties, he ran a secondhand bookshop with a friend and was briefly a member of the Communist Party of Uruguay's youth wing. His first short stories were published in science fiction magazines in Buenos Aires.

In 1966, Levrero wrote his first novel La ciudad (The City). He claimed the book was his attempt to "translate Kafka into Uruguayan". Published in 1970, the novel became part of what he described as an "involuntary trilogy" along with París (Paris) (1980) and El lugar (The Place) (1982). By the 1980s, Levrero was gaining more mainstream recognition after receiving an award for his novella Desplazamientos (Displacements).

Levrero received a Guggenheim Grant in 2000 to finish work on a project he had begun in 1984 that he called La novela luminosa (The Luminous Novel). Intended to be an account of a transcendental experience, the posthumously published work ended up as a composite of a diary detailing failed attempts at writing the novel and unedited chapters of the incomplete novel. It is widely regarded as his masterpiece.

Levrero died in Montevideo in 2004.

Levrero's work has inspired Latin American writers such as Rodolfo Fogwill, César Aira and Alejandro Zambra.

== Work ==
=== Novels ===
- La ciudad, 1970
- Diario de un canalla/Burdeos, 1972
- París, 1980
- El lugar, 1982
- Fauna/Desplazamientos, 1987
- La Banda del Ciempiés, 1989
- El alma de Gardel, 1996
- El discurso vacío, 1996
- Dejen todo en mis manos, 1998
- La novela luminosa, 2005
- Trilogía involuntaria (includes La ciudad, París, and El lugar), 2008
- Nick Carter se divierte mientras el lector es asesinado y yo agonizo y otras novelas, 2012
- La Banda del Ciempiés, 2015

=== Short story collections ===
- La máquina de pensar en Gladys, 1970 (“The Thinking-About-Gladys Machine”. 2024)
- Todo el tiempo, 1982
- Aguas salobres, 1983
- Los muertos, 1986
- Espacios libres, 1987
- El portero y el otro, 1992
- Ya que estamos, 2001
- Los carros de fuego, 2003
- Cuentos completos, 2019

=== Comic books ===
- Santo Varón/I, with artwork by Lizán, 1986
- Los profesionales, with artwork by Lizán, 1988
- Historietas reunidas de Jorge Varlotta, 2016

=== Other writings ===
- Manual de parapsicología, 1978
- Caza de conejos, 1986 (reissued in 2012)
- Irrupciones I, 2001
- Irrupciones II, 2001
