= René Avilés Fabila =

Mexican author (1940–2016)

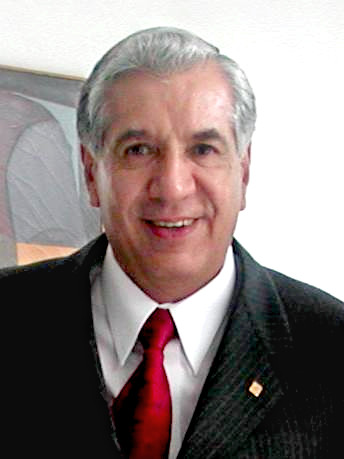
Portrait of René Avilés Fabila during his homenaje for 40 years as writer

René Avilés Fabila (November 15, 1940 – October 9, 2016) was a Mexican author whose work was recognized in Mexico and Iberoamerica.

== Biography ==
Fabila was born on November 15, 1940, in Mexico City and died on October 9, 2016.

He earned a BA in international relations and did postgraduate studies at the University of Paris. His bibliography is extensive and includes stories, novels, memoirs, essays, and articles. His most important novels are:

- The Games
- Tantadel
- Odette's Song
- The Great Solitaire of the Palace
- Requiem for a Suicide
- The Conquered Kingdom and
- Intangible Love

His other books include:

- Towards The End Of The World
- The Rain Does Not Kill the Flowers
- Fantasies on a Carousel
- All the Love
- Loving Fairy Tales
- The Gospel According to René Avilés Fabila
- The Forest of Wonders

and autobiographical books like:

- Remembrances
- New Remembrances
- Memoirs of a Communist

His work has been included in numerous anthologies and abroad is translated into several languages and are currently appearing in his Collected Works Editorial Nueva Imagen. Fifteen books to date.

In his more than forty years of literary work, teaching and journalism, he won numerous awards and recognitions. In 1991 the Mexican government awarded him the National Journalism Award for Dissemination of Culture. He also has national and international prizes awarded by various institutions. In 1972 the House of Americas, Havana, Cuba, gave one of its awards to the Fairy Tales and Hollywood's Disappearance. In 1997, the INBA and the state of Colima, gave him the award for best book of fiction. The book's title was called Prodigious Animals work prefaced by the poet Rubén Bonifaz Nuño and illustrated by Jose Luis Cuevas. It has also been repeatedly recognized by the Journalists Club of Mexico. In 1964 he was a Fellow of the Mexican Center of Writers, where under the direction of Juan Rulfo, Juan Jose Arreola and Francisco Monterde wrote his first book of short stories, Towards the End of the World published by the Fondo de Cultura Economica, and also by the Sistema Nacional de Creadores. He has been awarded many times by public and private institutions, universities and news organizations and cultural associations. It is worth noting that the tributes were held to celebrate his intense literary activity. They took the Fondo de Cultura Economica, UNAM, UAM, IPN, INBA, Casa Lamm, Alejo Peralta Foundation, the SOGEM and CONACULTA in various forums of Mexico City and spread to other cities like Tampico, Orizaba and Campeche. La Universidad Autónoma Metropolitana conducted a series of round tables on his first novel, The Games, 1967, there appeared a book published by the same institution called Eleven Points of View by René Avilés Fabila. In culture and art he had an extensive track record that goes from teaching at the university to public relations. He lectured at the Faculty of Political Sciences at UNAM starting in 1975 and was a full-time professor at La Universidad Autónoma Metropolitana at Xochimilco. He held various positions in the cultural area: director general of Cultural Diffusion of the UNAM (1984–1986), director of the Writing Center "Juan Jose Arreola" Lamm House of 1989–1993, and during the period 1998–2002, coordinator of University Extension of the UAM-Xochimilco. Starting in 1996 he was a member of the European Society of Culture (Venice), whose honorary chairman, until his death, was Norberto Bobbio. He lectured at various national and foreign universities at the UNAM, UAM, Universidad Iberoamericana, Yale, University of Kansas, University of Paris, University of Copenhagen, Helsinki University and UCLA, among others. In journalism, starting in 1962, he collaborated in several national newspapers: El Día, El Universal, El Nacional, Excélsior. He was one of the founders of the newspaper Unomásuno.

He founded and directed the cultural section of Excélsior (1984–1986), El Buho- (The Owl) (1985–1999). He led, from 2004 to 2006, Journal of Journals publication dean of Mexico, founded in 1910. They emphasize their articles for national magazines such as Siempre, La Crisis, Revista de Bellas Artes, Mexico en la Cultura, Revista de la UNAM, Mester and House of Time (UAM). And in international affairs he worked in the New World (Buenos Aires), Casa de las Americas (Havana), Cuadernos Semester Tale (Lima), Free Trade Zone (Caracas), Theorem (Bogota) and Hispamérica (Buenos Aires). For over ten years had their own programs in the Mexican Institute of Radio and the XEW, all cultural and special literature.

Starting in 1999 he was founder and editor of the monthly cultural magazine El Buho (The Owl), with a circulation of 5,000 copies distributed free to promote reading. He has his own foundation to promote culture.

Among his political activities, Fabila was part of the Organizing Committee of the Plebiscite Citizen, whose members developed the document entitled "20 Commitments for Democracy" of the Truth Commission 68, set up to investigate events during the student movement 1968, and San Angel Group. He wrote for Excelsior, The Chronicle and the magazine Siempre!. The UAM named him distinguished professor in 2009.

In 2010, UNAM in the Minería Book Fair highlighted that the writer turned 70 years old and made a tribute to that effect. He died on October 9, 2016, of a heart attack.
