= Death Takes a Flat =

1940 novel

- First edition (UK)
- Author: Cecil Street
- Language: English
- Series: Desmond Merrion
- Genre: Detective
- Publisher: Collins Crime Club (UK); Doubleday (US)
- Publication date: 1940
- Publication place: United Kingdom
- Media type: Print
- Preceded by: Mr. Westerby Missing
- Followed by: Up the Garden Path

Death Takes a Flat is a 1940 detective novel by the British writer Cecil Street, writing under the pen name of Miles Burton. It was the twenty-third in a series of books featuring the detective Desmond Merrion and Inspector Arnold of Scotland Yard. It was published in the United States by Doubleday under the alternative title Vacancy with Corpse.

Reviewing the novel for The Observer Maurice Richardson considered it was "Told with Mr. Burton's usual concentrated but infectious interest" while Maurice Willson Disher in the Times Literary Supplement noted "Mr. Burton follows the prevailing fashion of creating characters who obviously have a motive for murder and are obviously innocent, and of fastening the guilt upon an "unsuspect" whose motive is not worth the risk of hard labour, let alone the hangman's noose". In America, Isaac Anderson in the New York Times felt it "offers a good puzzle on which to test your wits"

== Synopsis ==
Major Pontefract, recently retired after a career in the British Indian Army, and his wife take a service flat in Kensington rather than following his instinct to buy a rural property. However, when the enter the apartment they find the body of Edgar Staplehurst, manager director of the company that owns the building, laying there. The police arrive and Arnold believes he has solved the murder, only for Merrion to disprove this theory.

== Bibliography ==
- Evans, Curtis. Masters of the "Humdrum" Mystery: Cecil John Charles Street, Freeman Wills Crofts, Alfred Walter Stewart and the British Detective Novel, 1920-1961. McFarland, 2014.
- Herbert, Rosemary. Whodunit?: A Who's Who in Crime & Mystery Writing. Oxford University Press, 2003.
- Reilly, John M. Twentieth Century Crime & Mystery Writers. Springer, 2015.
