= Jakob Streit =

Swiss writer, teacher and anthroposophist (1910–2009)

Jakob Streit (23 September 1910 in Spiez, Switzerland – 15 May 2009 in Spiez) was a Swiss writer, teacher and anthroposophist. Besides this, he worked as musician and choirmaster as well as conductor and dramaturg.

== Biography ==
Jakob Streit was born in the Berner Oberland in Switzerland, the son of a watchmaker, and lived there for most of his life. He had four brothers and sisters and everyone helped to tend the family beehives, their cow and calf and their sheep.

He studied education at the teacher-training college in Bern, where his skills in music, education and literature were honed. He completed his musical education with Hans Klee, the father of artist Paul Klee.

== Career ==
He began his career as a teacher of different age groups, in the course of which the many stories he told to the children were published as children's stories in over forty books. Many of these have been translated into English and other languages. His educational method, and particularly his music instruction drew heavily on the indications of Rudolf Steiner on Waldorf education.

When one has told stories to different age groups of children for 45 years on a daily basis, one learns a great deal from them, one is carried on the wings of Poetry, of the imagination. In later years, this interest grows into everything that is truly human. For example, this is how I came to write my first book about gnomes: A girl in the third grade brought a beautiful Edelweiss to my desk one morning, saying: 'My father gave it to me and told me that, if you can tell us how the Edelweiss came about, you can keep it.' Quickly the children all sat down at their desks, for in their eyes the teacher of the third grade is capable of anything at all. Forty pairs of eyes are looking expectantly at you. (...) I began thoughtfully; soon there were gnomes and elves in the picture, finding magic ways to transform the stars of the night into the Edelweiss. Carried by the astonished eyes of the children, my story must have gone on for about 20 minutes. When the Edelweiss had finally been created, a little boy stood up and proclaimed: 'Tomorrow you must deal with the Gentian.' In this manner, from day to day, we found our way through the different flowers of the mountains. I was not able to prepare at all. I needed the children to be there. Afterwards I wrote down the stories that had come about. They have been published as Bergblumen Märchen today with the publisher Oratio Verlag in Schaffhausen.

After producing plays with children, he broadened his interest to amateur-theatre direction, in the course of which he inaugurated the William Tell festival plays in Interlaken and the Spiez Castle Plays. Having studied piano and organ, his work as a choir conductor led him to produce a succession of operas, including The Magic Flute and Orpheus and Euridice.

Questions of art, art history and culture occupied him all his life. After his retirement, he began to lecture in most of Europe, besides increasing the scope of his literary work. For many years, he was editor of the AVS-Mitteilungen, the newssheet of the Anthroposophische Vereinigung in der Schweiz, continuing with this until his death at 99 years of age.

== Literary work ==
=== Books for children and young people ===
- And There Was Light – From the Creation of the World to Noah's Ark Jakob Streit; Translated by Ekkehard Piening AWSNA (Association of Waldorf Schools of North America) 2006 ISBN 9781888365740
- Brother Francis – The Life of Francis of Assisi Jakob Streit, AWSNA (Association of Waldorf Schools of North America) 2013 ISBN 9781936367405
- Geron and Virtus – A Fateful Encounter of Two Youths: A German and a Roman, Jakob Streit; Translated by Nina Kuettel AWSNA (Association of Waldorf Schools of North America) 2006 ISBN 9781888365702
- Invisible Guardians – True Stories of Fateful Encounters Jakob Streit; Translated by Nina Kuettel AWSNA (Association of Waldorf Schools of North America) 2011 ISBN 9781936367177
- Journey to the Promised Land – The Path of the People of Israel from Abraham's Calling to David's Dream Jakob Streit; Translated by Donald Samson AWSNA (Association of Waldorf Schools of North America) 1999 ISBN 9781888365238
- Liputto – Stories of Gnomes and Trolls Jakob Streit; Translated by Nina J. Kuettel AWSNA (Association of Waldorf Schools of North America) 1999 ISBN 9781888365269
- Little Bee Sunbeam Jakob Streit; Translated by Nina Kuettel AWSNA (Association of Waldorf Schools of North America) 2010 ISBN 9781888365986
- Milon and the Lion Jakob Streit; Translated by Wolfgang Forsthofer and Auriol de Smidt. Floris Books 2011 ISBN 978-0-86315-841-4
- Puck the Gnome Jakob Streit; Translated by Nina Kuettel AWSNA (Association of Waldorf Schools of North America) 2004 ISBN 9781888365542
- The Star Rider and Anna McLoon – Two Tales from Ireland Jakob Streit; Translated by Nina Kuettel AWSNA (Association of Waldorf Schools of North America) 2010 ISBN 9781888365955
- We Will Build a Temple – The Path of Israel from King Solomon to John the Baptist Jakob Streit; Translated by Donald Samson AWSNA (Association of Waldorf Schools of North America) 2004 ISBN 9781888365559
- What Animals Say to Each Other – 30 Nature Fables in Rhyme Jakob Streit; Kilian Beck AWSNA (Association of Waldorf Schools of North America) 2013 SBN 9781936367238
- The Bee Book Jakob Streit AWSNA (Association of Waldorf Schools of North America) 2010 ISBN 9781936367009
- Three Knight Tales Jakob Streit; Translated by Nina Kuettel AWSNA (Association of Waldorf Schools of North America) 2012 ISBN 9781936367245
- Little Gnome Tenderroot by Jakob Streit, illustrated by Georges Feldmann and translated by Nina Keuttel. Waldorf Publications; 27 January 2014. ISBN 978-1936367061
- Beatuslegenden. Troxler, Bern 1940
- Kindheitslegenden. Troxler, Bern 1941
- Tiergeschichten. Atlantis, Zürich 1941
- Dreikönigsbuch. Troxler, Bern 1951
- Bergblumenmärchen. Atlantis, Zürich 1954
- Kleine Schöpfungsgeschichte. Novalis, Freiburg im Breisgau 1956
- Die Söhne Kains. Novalis, Freiburg im Breisgau 1959
- Die schöne Magelone. Schweizerisches Jugendschriftenwerk (SJW), Zürich 1960
- Von Zwergen und Wildmannli. SJW, Zürich 1965
- Rösli von Stechelberg. SJW, Zürich 1968
- Beatus, ein irischer Glaubensbote. SJW, Zürich 1968
- Ich will dein Bruder sein. Freies Geistesleben, Stuttgart 1979
- Der erste Weihnachtsbaum. Erzählungen. Novalis, Freiburg im Breisgau 1983
- Ziehet hin ins gelobte Land. Freies Geistesleben, Stuttgart 1983
- Tatatucks Reise. Freies Geistesleben, Stuttgart 1984
- Louis Braille. Ein blinder Junge erfindet die Blindenschrift. Freies Geistesleben, Stuttgart 1987
- Geschichten vom Schenken und Helfen des Sankt Nikolaus. Freies Geistesleben, Stuttgart 1989
- Miriam zu Betlehem. Freies Geistesleben, Stuttgart 1989
- Ich will dein Bruder sein. Legende. Freies Geistesleben, Stuttgart 1989
- Die Zauberflöte. Freies Geistesleben, Stuttgart 1991
- Zwerg Wurzelfein. Urachhaus, Stuttgart 1992
- Die Geschichte der zwei Jesusknaben. Die Pforte, Basel 1992
- Im Rosenhaus. Urachhaus, Stuttgart 1992
- Ajuk und die Eisbären. Freies Geistesleben, Stuttgart 1993
- Das Osterlamm. Legende. Freies Geistesleben, Stuttgart 1993
- Nagick, das Eichhörnchen. AT, Aarau 1993
- Puck und der Regenbogen. Drei Zwerge besuchen das Menschenreich. Freies Geistesleben, Stuttgart 1996
- Odilie. Botin des Lichts. Freies Geistesleben, Stuttgart 1997
- Columban. Ein Kämpfer für das irische Christentum. Urachhaus, Stuttgart 2002
- Königskind und Hirtenkind. Die Geschichte der beiden Jesusknaben. Urachhaus, Stuttgart 2003

=== Non-fiction ===
- Sun and Cross – From Megalithic Culture to Early Christianity in Ireland Jakob Streit; Translated by Hugh Latham, Floris Books 2004 ISBN 9780863154409
- Erziehungskunst und Elternhaus. Die Kommenden, Freiburg im Breisgau 1954
  - Newly published as: Erziehung, Schule, Elternhaus. Erziehungsfragen und Erziehungshilfen. Novalis, Schaffhausen 1978
- Das Märchen im Leben des Kindes. Brügger, Meiringen 1964
  - Neuausgabe als: Warum Kinder Märchen brauchen. Verlag am Goetheanum (Ogham-Bücherei 24), Dornach 1985
- Waldorfpädagogik in öffentlichen Schulen. Herder, Freiburg im Breisgau 1976
- Vom Werden der Welt. Novalis, Schaffhausen 1981
- Comics oder Märchen? Gift oder Nahrung für die Seelen unserer Kinder (with Elisabeth Klein). Verein für ein erweitertes Heilwesen, Bad Liebenzell 2. A. 1984

=== Other ===
- Therese Keller – Porträt einer Puppenspielerin (as editor). Zytglogge, Gümligen 1974
- Anna Samweber: Aus meinem Leben (as editor). Die Pforte, Basel 1981
- Parzival. Der Weg zum heiligen Gral. Retold by Jakob Streit to illustrations by Werner Diedrich. Die Pforte, Basel 1997
- Wegspuren. Poetry. Pforte, Dornach 2000

=== Radio plays and broadcasts ===
- Beatus, ein irischer Glaubensbote. Radio DRS, Bern 1950
- Der vierte König. DRS, Bern 1952
- Clara von Rappard. DRS, Bern 1957

=== Plays ===
- Rösli vom Stechelberg. The Freie Marionettenbühne Wengen performs this as a puppet play in 4 acts, Premiere 25 December 2002.
