= Arthur Calder-Marshall =

English writer (1908–1992)

- Calder-Marshall in 1934
- Born: 19 August 1908; El Misti, Wallington, Surrey, England
- Died: 17 April 1992 (aged 83); United Kingdom
- Occupations: Novelist; essayist; critic; memoirist; biographer
- Spouse: Ara Calder-Marshall (née Violet Nancy Sales)
- Children: Anna Calder-Marshall
- Relatives: Tom Burke (grandson)
- Writing career
- Genres: Fiction, essays, criticism, memoir, biography

Arthur Calder-Marshall (19 August 1908 – 17 April 1992) was an English novelist, essayist, critic, memoirist, and biographer.

== Life and career ==
Calder-Marshall was born in Wallington, Surrey, the son of Alice (Poole) and Arthur Grotjan Marshall (later Calder-Marshall; 1875 –1958), a civil engineer. The elder Arthur was grandson of the Scottish sculptor William Calder Marshall (1813–1894). William Calder Marshall's father William Marshall (1780–1859), a goldsmith and jeweller, had married Annie, daughter of merchant William Calder, D.L., Lord Provost of Edinburgh 1810–11, by his wife Agnes, a daughter of landed gentleman Hugh Dalrymple. The Marshall family were Episcopalian goldsmiths from Perthshire; the Calder family were merchants.

In his youth, Calder-Marshall lived with his family in Steyning, where he made friends with Victor Neuberg, the poet and associate of Aleister Crowley. His 1951 memoir The Magic of My Youth includes extensive anecdotes re: Neuberg (nicknamed "Vickybird"), Crowley himself, and other Crowley associates such as Raoul Loveday and Betty May.

In 1930, Calder-Marshall taught at Chigwell School. His experiences there were later fictionalised in The Magic of My Youth, which includes an illustration of himself being given a tour of the school by its headmaster. A short, unhappy stint teaching English at Denstone College, Staffordshire, 1931–33, inspired his novel Dead Centre. In the 1930s, Calder-Marshall adopted strong left-wing views. He joined the Communist Party of Great Britain and was also a member of the London-based left-wing Writers and Readers Group which also included Randall Swingler, Tom Wintringham, Sylvia Townsend Warner, Mulk Raj Anand, Maurice Richardson and Rose Macaulay.

In 1937, Calder-Marshall wrote scripts for MGM although none appears to have been filmed.

Calder-Marshall's fiction and non-fiction covered a wide range of subjects. He himself remarked, "I have never written two books on the same subject or with the same object."

In the 1960s, Calder-Marshall took on commissioned work which included a novelisation of the Dirk Bogarde film Victim. He has additionally been proposed as the author of The Adventures of James Bond Junior 003½ a children's novel about British spy James Bond's nephew, published under the pseudonym R. D. Mascott.

With his wife, documentary screenplay-writer Ara (born Violet Nancy Sales), he was the father of the actress Anna Calder-Marshall and the grandfather of the actor Tom Burke. He and his wife visited the English novelist Malcolm Lowry in Mexico and attested to his chronic alcoholism-fuelled creative processes in an interview they gave which was included in the 1976 documentary Volcano: An Inquiry into the Life and Death of Malcolm Lowry.

== Media adaptations ==
Orson Welles adapted The Way to Santiago in 1941 for RKO. However Welles's troubles with the studio meant that no film was made.

James Mason purchased the film rights to Occasion of Glory, intending to make this project his directorial debut. Mason hired Christopher Isherwood to write the script.

== Bibliography ==
=== Biography ===
The Enthusiast; An Enquiry into the Life Beliefs and Character of the Rev. Joseph Leycester Lyne alias Fr. Ignatius, O.S.B., Abbot of Elm Hill, Norwich and Llanthony Wales (1962, Faber and Faber; facsimile reprint 2000, Llanerch Publishers, Felinfach)

=== Adult fiction ===
Novels:

- Two of a Kind (1933)
- About Levy (1933)
- At Sea (1934)
- Dead Centre (1935)
- Pie in the Sky (1937)
- The Way to Santiago (1940)
- A Man Reprieved (1949)
- Occasion of Glory (1955)
- The Scarlet Boy (1961)

Short fiction:

- Crime Against Cania (1934)
- A Pink Doll (1935)
- A Date with a Duchess (1937)

Play:

- Season of Goodwill (1965) (based on Every Third Thought by Dorothea Malm)

As William Drummond:

- Midnight Lace (1960) (novelisation)
- Victim 1961 (novelisation)
- Life for Ruth 1962 (novelisation)
- Night Must Fall 1964 (novelisation)
- Gaslight 1966 (novelisation)

=== Children's fiction ===
- The Man from Devil's Island (1958)
- The Fair to Middling (1959)

=== Adult non-fiction ===
Memoirs

- The Magic of My Youth (1951)

Travel

- Glory Dead (Trinidad) (1939)
- The Watershed (Yugoslavia) (1947)

Miscellany

- (With Edward J. H. O'Brien and J. Davenport) The Guest Book (1935 and 1936)
- Challenge to Schools: A Pamphlet on Public School Education (1935)
- The Changing Scene (essays on English society) (1937)
- (With others) Writing in Revolt: Theory and Examples (1937)
- The Book Front (1947)
- No Earthly Command (biography of Alexander Riall Wadham Woods) (1957)
- Havelock Ellis: A Biography (1959) US title The Sage of Sex: A Life of Havelock Ellis (1960)
- The Innocent Eye (biography of Robert Flaherty) (1963)
- Wish You Were Here: The Art of Donald McGill (1966)
- Lewd, Blasphemous, and Obscene: Being the Trials and Tribulations of Sundry Founding Fathers of Today's Alternative Societies (1972)
- The Grand Century of the Lady (1976)
- The Two Duchesses (1978)

=== Children's non-fiction ===
- Lone Wolf: The Story of Jack London (1963)

=== Editor ===
Calder-Marshall edited and wrote the introduction to:

- Tobias Smollett (1950)
- The Bodley Head Jack London (four volumes: 1963–66)
- Prepare to Shed Them Now: The Ballads of George R. Sims (1968)
- Thomas Paine, The Rights of Man and Other Writings (1970)

== Additional sources ==
- The Reader's Companion to Twentieth-Century Writers, Frank Kermode, Peter Parker eds. (London: Fourth Estate, 1995), page 126
- Contemporary Authors New Revision Series, volume 72, Gale.
- St. James Guide to Horror, Ghost & Gothic Writers, David Pringle, (St. James Press, 1998)
- Science Fiction and Fantasy Literature: Volume 2, R. Reginald, Douglas Menville, Mary A. Burgess (Wildside Press LLC, 2010), pp. 840–1
