= Francis Ambrière =

French author

- Born: 27 September 1907; Paris, France
- Died: 1 July 1998 (aged 90)
- Occupation: French author
- Writing career
- Language: French
- Notable works: Joachim du Bellay, Firmin-Didot et cie, 1930; Estaunié, John Charpentier, Francis Ambrière, Firmin-Didot et cie, 1932; Les grandes vacances, 1939-1945, Les Éditions de la nouvelle France, 1946, (reprint Éditions du Seuil, 1956); The long holiday Translator Elaine P. Halperin, Publisher Ziff-Davis Pub. Co., 1948; Le solitaire de la Cervara, V. Attinger, 1947
- Notable awards: Prix Goncourt in 1940 for his book Les Grandes Vacances

Francis Ambrière (27 September 1907 – 1 July 1998) was a French author who was selected for the Prix Goncourt in 1940, for his book Les Grandes Vacances; the prize was awarded in 1946 because of World War II. He was born in Paris.

== Biography ==
Francis Ambriere has been recognised for his novel Les Grandes Vacances, which chronicles the lives of French prisoners of war in 1940. He was the author of several Guides bleus for example in Paris in 1949, and then Greece in 1957, or on Italy published in 1960.

== Works ==
- Joachim du Bellay, Firmin-Didot et cie, 1930
- Estaunié, John Charpentier, Francis Ambrière, Firmin-Didot et cie, 1932
- Les grandes vacances, 1939-1945, Les Éditions de la nouvelle France, 1946, (reprint Éditions du Seuil, 1956)
  - The long holiday Translator Elaine P. Halperin, Publisher Ziff-Davis Pub. Co., 1948
- Le solitaire de la Cervara, V. Attinger, 1947
- The exiled, Staples Press, 1951
- Le Maroc, Les Documents d'art, 1952
- Théâtre et collectivité, Flammarion, 1953
- Le Siecle des Valmore, Seuil, 1987
- Mademoiselle Mars et Marie Dorval: au théâtre et dans la vie, Seuil, 1992
- Talma, ou l'histoire au théâtre, Madeleine Ambrière, Francis Ambrière, Éditions de Fallois, 2007, ISBN 978-2-87706-638-9
