= The Long Holiday =

Book by Francis Ambrière

First English-language edition (publ. Ziff Davis)

The Long Holiday (1946; French: Les Grandes Vacances) is a French novel by Francis Ambrière that chronicles the lives of French prisoners of war between 1940 and 1945. It was first published in 1946 and in that year was also awarded the 1940 Prix Goncourt, which previously had been missed because of the German invasion of France. The novel was translated in 1948 by Elaine P. Halperin as The Long Holiday. It was reissued in a definitive version in 1956 entitled Les Grandes Vacances, 1939-1945.
