= Alberto Spaini =

Albert Spaini
- Born: 6 July 1892; Trieste (Austrian Littoral), Austria-Hungary
- Died: 25 January 1975 (aged 82); Rome, Italy
- Education: Florence; Rome; Berlin
- Occupations: Literary critic Political journalist Commentator; Author; Translator
- Spouse(s): 1. Rosina Pisaneschi (1890-1960); 2. Laura Farina Moschini (-1963)
- Children: 1. Giuliana Spaini (1918-); 2. Dr. Paolo Spaini (1925-2019)
- Parents: Federico Spaini (father); Luigia Antoniani (mother)

Alberto Spaini (6 July 1892 - 25 January 1975) was an Italian journalist-commentator and author. He was also a scholar of German literature, producing through his career many translations into Italian of traditional and contemporary German classics.

== Life ==
=== Provenance and early years ===
Alberto Spaini was born and, till shortly after his eighteenth birthday, grew up in Trieste, the multi-ethnic bi-lingual administrative and commercial capital of the so-called "Austrian Littoral". Federico Spaini, his father, was a bank worker. His mother, born Luigia Antoniani, was from Venice. Alberto attended the Ginnasio Dante Alighieri (secondary school) in Trieste.

=== Student in Italy ===
In 1910 he moved to Italy, enrolling at the prestigious Institute for Higher Studies at Florence to study Literature. He quickly became a member of a circle of friends that included Giani and (a couple of years later) Carlo Stuparich, Scipio Slataper, Italo Tavolato and Guido Devescovi. All these young students of Italian Literature were originally from Trieste which, before 1920, was in a semi-detached part of Austria rather than in Italy. The students from Trieste became part of the group of young intellectuals around Giuseppe Prezzolini who had recently founded La Voce, a literary magazine published in Florence, which was already becoming very influential among the intellectual classes. Alongside his degree studies, the "real schooling" Spaini received in Florence came from the opportunity Prezzolini gave him to write for La Voce. Although conventionally classified as a literary magazine, La Voce never held back from sharing insights from its contributors into the social and political challenges of the day. Despite his extreme youth under the circumstances, Spaini's own first contribution appeared in La Voce in the issue for 6 October 1910. It concerned issues that had arisen at the "Banca Popolare Triestina". Over the next few years he became a regular contributor, using the pseudonym "Aspa". Editor-in-chief Prezzolini was a native of Tuscany: his parents came from Siena. At the editorial offices of La Voce Spaini also came to know Rosina Pisaneschi, the daughter of a psychiatrist from Siena and, like Spaini, a student of literature. A few years later, in 1915, Alberto Spaini and Rosina Pisaneschi married.

After approximately a year he transferred to Rome where he attended the university courses in German literature conducted by Giuseppe Antonio Borgese. Student contemporaries who became friends included Bonaventura Tecchi. He also undertook a lengthy study trip to Avignon where he met the widely respected poet Frédéric Mistral. Together they made plans for Spaini to produce Italian language translations of some of Mistral's works. It was also during this period that he embarked on what would become a sixty-year correspondence with Prezzolini, whose career as a hands-on magazine proprietor was continuing to progress back in Florence.

=== Berlin ===
In September 1912 Spaini moved to Berlin, accompanied by Rosina Pisaneschi. They remained in the German capital till May 1913. Fascinated to the point of obsession by the cultural life of the city, and thanks in the first instance to an intervention by his friend Italo Tavolato, he was able to take part in the "cultural soirees" organised by the recently launched weekly expressionist review magazine Der Sturm. Fellow participants, identified by name in his letters back to Italy, included leading figures from Germany's younger generation of (mainly expressionist) writers, such as Else Lasker-Schüler, Thomas Mann, Franz Kafka (who met Felice Bauer in Berlin in September 1912), Franz Werfel, Hugo von Hofmannsthal and Rainer Maria Rilke. In Berlin, Spaini was taught by Norbert von Hellingrath who was already working on the first critical edition of the complete collected works of Hölderlin. In a letter to Prezzolini he described Berlin as a "catasrophic" and "impenetrable" city. His eight-month visit nevertheless proved decisive in terms both of his student studies and of his subsequent literary career.

=== Journalist ===
Having cut his teeth in journalism between 1910 and 1913 with his contributions to La Voce as a literary critic, political columnist and writer of short stories, and with the active backing of Prezzolini, Spaini accepted a complementary position as a foreign correspondent for Il Resto del Carlino, a daily newspaper based in Bologna and at that time produced under the direction of Mario Missiroli. He was still living in Berlin when he was offered the position. The appointment marked the beginning of an intensive journalistic career, between 1913 and 1974, during the course of which Spaini would contribute approximately one thousand articles. Throughout that time, many of his pieces related to German culture and, in particular, German literature. Most, though not all, of his contributions appeared in one of five somewhat "niche" literary journals and/or in one of five daily newspapers. The magazines were "Occidente", "La Ronda", "La Fiera Letteraria", "Nuova Antologia" and "900". The daily papers to which he contributed most could all be considered mass-circulation publications in at least in their home regions, and three of the five were distributed nationally. These were "Il Messaggero", "Il Piccolo" (published in Trieste), "Il Secolo XIX", "La Stampa" and "Giornale di Sicilia". Many of his articles appeared pseudonymously, using names such as "Marco Lotto", "Filangeri" or, more simply, "Anonimo".

=== Professional translator ===
1913 was also the year in which Spaini launched himself on a parallel career as a professional translator from German into Italian. The selected work was Goethe's very substantial second novel, known in English as "Wilhelm Meister's Apprenticeship". Two translators are credited jointly: Alberto Spaini and his future wife Rosina Pisaneschi. For the Italian language version Goethe's eight volumes were adapted into two volumes, each comprising more than 1,000 pages. In a self-portrait piece, written half a lifetime later, Spaini would marvel at the "serenity of youth" he had displayed, aged just 20 and then 21, sailing into the project with very little appreciation of the scale of the task. The appearance of the first Italian language volume was quickly followed by a lengthy article from Spaini himself, appearing in La Voce, entitled "La modernità di Goethe" (loosely, "Goethe's modernity"). The translation marked not just a turning point in the translator's career, but also in the history of German literature in Italy. Its appearance provided the occasion for a major controversy on the translation into Italian of foreign language novels. Spaini lined up with the brilliant young scholar of Germanistics from Milan, Lavinia Mazzucchetti, whose own reputation among scholars had recently been greatly elevated by publication of her book "Schiller in Italia". The target of their indignation was an aging librarian and authority of Slavic culture called Domenico Ciampoli who had recently republished an old translation of the same Goethe novel. The version promoted by Ciampoli came not from Goethe's text, but from an "intermediate" French translation of it, "filled with cuts and manipulations". For Spaini and Mazzucchetti, Ciampoli had compounded his error by attributing the old translation, incorrectly, to Giovanni Berchet. During the nineteenth century, with French widely regarded as the only universal language across much of Europe and beyond, it had not been uncommon for Italian publishers to sell foreign language books translated into Italian via an intermediate French language version rather from the original language text, but by the end of the nineteenth century, following major advances in relevant communications technologies, the practice was increasingly frowned upon. In the aftermath of the literary attacks on Ciampoli's application of it to an important work by Goethe himself, the use of an intermediate language for translations into Italian - at least when the original text had been printed in German - was no longer considered acceptable.

During the first couple of decades of their marriage in particular, many of Spaini's translations were produced jointly with his wife. Some were of the eighteenth and nineteenth century German classics, including several more works of Goethe, such as the novel known in English as "The Sorrows of Young Werther", the reminiscences "Italian Journey" and the "Letters to the Lady von Stein". He produced Italian translations of Hoffmann's "Princess Brambilla" and of Tieck's "Knight Bluebeard". The fantastical fairy-tale spirit of these last two clearly found its way into three of the novels that Spaini authored on his own account during the later 1920s and early 1930s: "Bertoldo's Travels", "The Bishop's Wife" and "Malintesi". (Note: "I viaggi di Bertoldo", "La moglie del vescovo" e "Malintesi".)

Spaini was also something of a pioneer in terms of translating twentieth century German books that would come to be seen as classics of their time. He was among the first to recognise the quality of Thomas Mann's work, producing a translation of the monumental book "Reflections of an Unpolitical Man" which in Germany had been published during the immediate aftermath of the First World War: this was one translation that was destined to remain unpublished. Spaini was the first professional Italian translator to work on the novels of Alfred Döblin: ninety years later his 1931 translation of "Berlin Alexanderplatz" remains the only Italian version ever published. Another twentieth century icon of German language literature whose works Spaini translated into Italian was Franz Kafka. His Italian edition of "The Trial" was published in 1933 and that of "America" in 1945. Of particular interest to those with an interest in the translator's craft were the prefaces that Spaini included in his published translations. These often included the translator's musings on theoretical and practical challenges encountered in producing the Italian language texts. The preface to the Italian version of Döblin's "Berlin Alexanderplatz" deals in some detail with the challenges of translating Berlin dialect into Italian. Over the years Spaini produced a number of essays dealing with translation, such as one entitled "Traduzioni e traduttori" ("Translations and translators").

=== Degree ===
In 1914 Spaini finally completed his university degree. His degree dissertation was supervised by Borgese and entitled "Federico Hölderlin. Storia dell’uomo e dell’artista" (loosely, "Friedrich Hölderlin: man and artist"). In the dissertation Spaini was able to include a many significant new insights into the writings of the Swabian poet, not leastly on account of unpublished material - unpublished, at this point, even in Germany - provided by von Hellingrath, his tutor during his months in Berlin. In striking contrast to his experiences with his experiences with Giuseppe Prezzolini in Florence, Spaini's relationship with his tutor at Rome never evolved into any sort of friendship beyond the university. There was some sort of agreement with Borgese that Spaini should undertake a major translation project for the publisher Carabba, involving works by the philosopher-poet Johann Gottfried Herder, but for reasons that remain unclear, no such project was ever progressed. Many years later Spaini would remember Borgese as a man who, for all his teaching ability, had barely any contact with his students beyond the classroom. It is only fair to add that Spaini himself seems to have had little appetite for a career in the universities sector, having already found a route to professional fulfilment with his work as a journalist and translation work acquired through Prezzolini and other publishing contacts.

=== War years ===
When the great powers launched the First World War in the summer of 1914 the Italian government resisted international pressure to join in with the fighting. By May 1915, however, the government had succumbed to the blandishments of the British, and the country entered the war, not on the side of its Triple Alliance partners but on the opposing side, alongside the British, French and Russians. In 1916 Spaini was sent to participate in the fighting on the Austrian front as a member of a Bersaglieri (infantry) regiment based in Belluno (Veneto). However, following an accident later that same year he was withdrawn from the frontline and moved to Switzerland where he lived, apparently with Rosina whom he had married in 1915, in the hill country between Bern and Zürich. From Switzerland he was able to continue with his contributions, as "foreign correspondent" to the Bologna-based newspaper, "Il Resto del Carlino". He was also closely involved with the emerging Dada group at the Cabaret Voltaire in Zürich. In 1918 Giuliana was born, the first child of Alberto Spaini's marriage to Rosina.

=== Theatre ===
Alongside his work as a journalist and as a translator, after the war Spaini displayed a two-pronged interest in theatre, both as a scholar-critic and as an author. He worked closely with Anton Giulio Bragaglia's "Teatro Sperimentale degli Indipendenti" ("Independents' Experimental Theatre") in Rome after it opened in 1922, both producing theatrical texts and translating stage plays from younger generations of avant-garde German dramatists. His Italian language translation of Wedekind's "Dance of death" ("Totentanz" / "Danza macabra") was staged in 1923, followed a couple of years later by "Wetterstein Castle". The theatre produced his translation of Büchner's Leonce and Lena in February 1928. He teamed up with Corrado Alvaro to create a script for a staging of "La veglia dei lestofanti" ("The swindlers' vigil"), an Italian translation of Brecht's Threepenny Opera, and one of the most successful productions ever staged by the "Teatro Sperimentale degli Indipendenti". (Note: Some international sources indicate that the Spaini/Alvaro version of "La veglia dei lestofanti" had its premiere in March 1930 at the Teatro dei Filodrammatici in Milan; but there are Italian language sources indicating that the smaller "Teatro Sperimentale degli Indipendenti" in Rome staged it a few months earlier.)

=== Correspondent ===
Despite his increasing predilection for translation, through the 1920s Spaini pursued his journalism career with energy, frequently credited in his contributions as a "foreign correspondent". During the first part of the decade he was based for a time in Katowice, reporting on the Upper Silesia plebiscite and the contentious partition of the ethnically divided region that ensued. In 1925 - the year in which his son was born - he was reporting from Paris There were also frequent assignments involving visits to Germany and Austria. In Italy he became increasingly friendly with a number of (cautiously) independently minded journalist-intellectuals and writers such as Antonio Baldini, Massimo Bontempelli, Vincenzo Cardarelli, Emilio Cecchi and Silvio D'Amico.

=== 1933 essay ===
Although the Mussolini government took power in 1922, the transfer from democracy to tyranny was less abrupt than it would be eleven years later in Germany after the Hitler government took power in 1933. Nevertheless, during the 1930s references to Alberto Spaini as a "foreign correspondent" disappear, and his journalism seems to have become increasingly focused on the arts pages. Of particular interest is his 301 page essay on "Il teatro tedesco" ("... German theatre") which appeared in 1933. The piece, which was published as part of the "Collezione Critica" series published under the auspices of Silvio D'Amico's short-lived review magazine "Scenario", drew heavily on Spaini's own theatre experience. Spaini takes as his starting point 1889, the year in which Hauptmann's social drama "Vor Sonnenaufgang" ("Before dawn") was staged, inaugurating the so-called naturist movement in theatre, and then progresses through the years of symbolism and expressionism. It stops abruptly early in 1933, the point at which Adolf Hitler, at the end of his first week in power, appointed Hanns Johst to take over as director at the Berlin State Theatre (as it was known at that time), following the enforced resignation on 18 January 1033 of the Jewish socialist Leopold Jessner.

=== More war ===
War returned to Italy in 1940. In many respects the pattern of Spaini's professional life changed little during the earlier war years, which he spent living in Rome. The arrest of Mussolini in July 1943 was followed by the liberation of Rome in June 1944. Naples had been liberated from fascism in October 1943 but in January 1944 was badly affected by an eruption of the nearby volcano. Later in 1944 Spaini accepted an appointment as co-director and political correspondent at "Il Giornale", a newspaper published at that time in Naples under the directorship of Carlo Zaghi. Between 1944 and 1946 the Milanese publishing house republished the stage play translations he had produced for Bragaglia during the 1920s and 30s; and in 1945 Einaudi Editore in Turin published the translation of Kafka's "Amerika" which Spaini had completed shortly before the outbreak of the war.

=== Radio 3 ===
1950 saw the reinstatement of Rai Radio 3, a national radio channel devoted principally to culture and the arts. There were also two "radio columns" devoted to political matters, differentiated between domestic and foreign topics. Alberto Spaini was appointed to take charge of the "radio column" devoted to foreign politics.

=== Loss: final years ===
Spaini's first wife, Rosina, died in 1960. His second marriage was to the writer Laura Farina Moschini, but she then died in 1963. Spaini remained in Rome, during his later years living with his widowed daughter Giuliana and his grandchildren Paolo and Albertina. He continued to write for a number of daily newspapers, and in 1964 released "La moglie di Noè" ("Noah's wife"), a collection of animal stories. Alberto Spaini died at Rome on 3 January 1975 aged 82.
