= 2007 in public domain =

When a work's copyright expires, it enters the public domain. The following is a list of works that entered the public domain in 2007. Since laws vary globally, the copyright status of some works are not uniform.

== Entered the public domain in countries with life + 70 years ==
With the exception of Belarus (Life + 50 years) and Spain (Life + 80 years for creators that died before 1987), a work enters the public domain in Europe 70 years after the creator's death, if it was published during the creator's lifetime. The list is sorted alphabetically and includes a notable work of the creator that entered the public domain on January 1, 2007.

Names	Country	Birth	Death	Occupation	Notable work
James Churchward	United Kingdom	27 February 1851	4 January 1936	occult writer.	The Lost Continent of Mu, the Motherland of Men, The Children of Mu
Ramón del Valle-Inclán	Spain	28 October 1866	5 January 1936	dramatist, novelist.	El marqués de Bradomín. Coloquios románticos (The Marquis of Bradomin. Romantic meetings), Bohemian Lights
Mateiu Caragiale	Romania	25 March 1885	17 January 1936	novelist, poet.	Craii de Curtea-Veche (Rakes of the Old Court), Remember
Rudyard Kipling	United Kingdom	30 December 1865	18 January 1936	novelist, poet, short-story writer.	The Jungle Book, The Second Jungle Book
Elizabeth Robins Pennell	United States	21 February 1855	7 February 1936	art critic, biographer, memoirist, travel writer.	Nights: Rome & Venice in the Aesthetic Eighties, London & Paris in the Fighting Nineties
Rahel Sanzara	Germany	9 February 1894	8 February 1936	novelist.	Das verlorene Kind (The Lost Child), Die glückliche Hand
Lidia Veselitskaya	Russia	17 March 1857	23 February 1936	novelist, short-story writer, memoirist, translator.	Mimi's Marriage, Mimi at the Springs, Mimi Poisons Herself
Mikhail Kuzmin	Russia	18 October 1872	1 March 1936	musician, novelist, poet.	Wings, Alexandrian Songs
A. de Herz	Romania	15 December 1887	9 March 1936	playwright, poet, short-story writer.	Păianjenul (The Spider), Noaptea Învierii (Resurrection Night)
Marguerite Durand	France	24 January 1864	16 March 1936	journalist, pamphlet writer.	founder of the newspaper La Fronde (The Sling)
A. E. Housman	United Kingdom	26 March 1859	30 April 1936	classical scholar, poet.	A Shropshire Lad, Last Poems
Robert E. Howard	United States	22 January 1906	11 June 1936	sword and sorcery writer.	The Hour of the Dragon, Worms of the Earth
M. R. James	United Kingdom	1 August 1862	12 June 1936	ghost story writer, medievalist, antiquarian.	Ghost Stories of an Antiquary, More Ghost Stories of an Antiquary
Karl Kraus	Austria	28 April 1874	12 June 1936	essayist, playwright, poet, satirist.	Die letzten Tage der Menschheit (The Last Days of Mankind), Literatur oder man wird doch da sehn (Literature, or You Ain't Seen Nothing Yet)
G. K. Chesterton	United Kingdom	29 May 1874	14 June 1936	mystery writer, philosopher, lay theologian, apologist.	The Napoleon of Notting Hill, The Man Who Was Thursday
Maxim Gorky	Russia	28 March 1868	18 June 1936	novelist, playwright, poet, short-story writer.	The Life of Klim Samgin, The Artamonov Business
Donald Maxwell	United Kingdom	14 April 1877	25 July 1936	travel writer, illustrator.	regular illustrator for the newspapers The Graphic and Church Times
F. J. Harvey Darton	United Kingdom	22 September 1878	26 July 1936	literary historian, novelist, publisher.	The Story of English Children's Books in England: Five Centuries of Social Life, Alibi Pilgrimage
Mourning Dove	United States	1884	8 August 1936	Western novelist, folklore writer.	Cogewea, Coyote Stories
Grazia Deledda	Italy	27 September 1871	15 August 1936	novelist.	After the Divorce, Canne al vento (Reeds in the wind)
Federico García Lorca	Spain	5 June 1898	19 August 1936	playwright, poet.	The Butterfly's Evil Spell, The Billy-Club Puppets
Juliette Adam	France	4 October 1836	23 August 1936	novelist, memoirist.	Mes premières armes littéraires et politiques, Mes sentiments et nos idées avant 1870
J. Slauerhoff	Netherlands	15 September 1898	5 October 1936	novelist, poet.	Het verboden rijk (The forbidden kingdom), Oost-Azië (East Asia)
Stefan Grabiński	Poland	26 February 1887	12 November 1936	horror writer.	Z Wyjątków. W Pomrokach Wiary (Exceptions: In the Dark of Faith), Na Wzgórzu Róż (On the Hill of Roses)
Luigi Pirandello	Italy	28 June 1867	10 December 1936	dramatist, novelist, poet, short-story writer.	The Late Mattia Pascal, Six Characters in Search of an Author
Frances Garnet Wolseley, 2nd Viscountess Wolseley	United Kingdom	15 September 1872	24 December 1936	gardening writer.	Gardening for Women, Women on the Land
Kristína Royová	Slovakia	18 August 1860	27 December 1936	novelist, poet.	Bez Boha na svete (Without God in the world), Bludári (Heretics)
John Cornford	United Kingdom	27 December 1915	28 December 1936	poet.	Full Moon At Tierz
Miguel de Unamuno	Spain	29 September 1864	31 December 1936	classics scholar, novelist, playwright, philosopher.	Abel Sánchez: The History of a Passion, Mist

== Entered the public domain in countries with life + 50 years ==
In most countries of Africa and Asia, as well as Belarus, Bolivia, Canada, New Zealand, Egypt and Uruguay; a work enters the public domain 50 years after the creator's death.

Names	Country	Birth	Death	Occupation	Notable work
Wickham Steed	United Kingdom	10 October 1871	13 January 1956	historian, journalist.	Hitler Whence and Whither?, The Meaning of Hitlerism
Sheila Kaye-Smith	United Kingdom	4 February 1887	14 January 1956	novelist.	Joanna Godden, The End of the House of Alard
H. L. Mencken	United States	12 September 1880	29 January 1956	cultural critic, essayist, satirist.	The American Language, The Philosophy of Friedrich Nietzsche
A. A. Milne	United Kingdom	18 January 1882	31 January 1956	novelist, playwright, poet.	Winnie-the-Pooh, The House at Pooh Corner
Edmund Clerihew Bentley	United Kingdom	10 July 1875	30 March 1956	humorist, mystery novelist, poet.	Trent's Last Case, Trent's Own Case
Arthur Talmage Abernethy	United States	10 October 1872	15 May 1956	poet, theologian.	The Hell You Say!: A Novel, The Jew a Negro; Being a Study of the Jewish Ancestry from an Impartial Standpoint
Max Beerbohm	United Kingdom	24 August 1872	20 May 1956	caricaturist, humorist, novelist, parodist.	Zuleika Dobson, The Happy Hypocrite
Ion Călugăru	Romania	14 February 1902	22 May 1956	novelist, short-story writer.	Copilăria unui netrebnic (The Childhood of a Ne'er-do-well), Oțel și pîine (Steel and Bread)
Walter de la Mare	United Kingdom	25 April 1873	22 June 1956	children's writer, horror writer.	Memoirs of a Midget, Collected Stories for Children
Nicos Nicolaides	Greece	3 April 1884	24 June 1956	dramatist, short-story writer, painter.	To Stravoxylo (The Peevish Fellow), O Skelethras Diegimata B (The Skeleton Short Stories'. Book 2)
Gottfried Benn	Germany	2 May 1886	7 July 1956	essayist, poet.	Morgue und andere Gedichte (Morgue and other Poems), Doppelleben (Double Life)
Giovanni Papini	Italy	9 January 1881	8 July 1956	novelist, short-story writer, philosopher.	Gog, Il crepuscolo dei filosofi (The Twilight of the Philosophers)
Jackson Pollock	United States	28 January 1912	11 August 1956	Painter	
Bertolt Brecht	Germany	10 February 1898	14 August 1956	playwright, poet.	The Threepenny Opera, The Flight Across the Ocean
Michael Ventris	United Kingdom	12 July 1922	6 September 1956	classics scholar, philologist.	Documents in Mycenaean Greek, Introducing the Minoan Language
A. L. Zissu	Romania	25 January 1888	6 September 1956	dramatist, essayist, novelist, polemicist.	Nu există cult mozaic (No Such Thing as a Mosaic Religion), Calea Calvarului (The Path of Calvary)
Hans Carossa	Germany	15 December 1878	12 September 1956	novelist, poet.	Stella Mystica, Ungleiche Welten (Unequal Worlds)
Pío Baroja	Spain	28 December 1872	30 October 1956	novelist.	The Tree of Knowledge, Memorias de un Hombre de Acción (Memories of a Man of Action)
B. R. Ambedkar	India	14 April 1891	6 December 1956	economist, political writer, journal writer.	Castes in India: Their Mechanism, Genesis and Development, The Buddha and His Dhamma
Arthur Grimble	United Kingdom	11 June 1888	13 December 1956	travel writer, memoirist.	A Pattern of Islands, Return to the Islands
Robert Walser	Switzerland	15 April 1878	25 December 1956	novelist, poet, short-story writer.	Jakob von Gunten, The Assistant

== Entering the public domain in the United States ==
In the United States, the copyright status of works extends for the life of the author or artists, plus 70 years. If the work is owned by a corporation, then the copyright extends 95 years.

Due to the passing of the Copyright Term Extension Act (Sonny Bono Copyright Term Extension Act) in 1998, works never registered or published before January 1, 1978, and whose authors died before 1937 entered the public domain in this jurisdiction on January 1, 2007. Other works would not enter the public domain here until 2019.

== See also ==
- 1906 in literature and 1956 in literature for deaths of writers
- Public Domain Day
- Creative Commons
