= George Călinescu =

Romanian literary critic and writer (1899–1965)

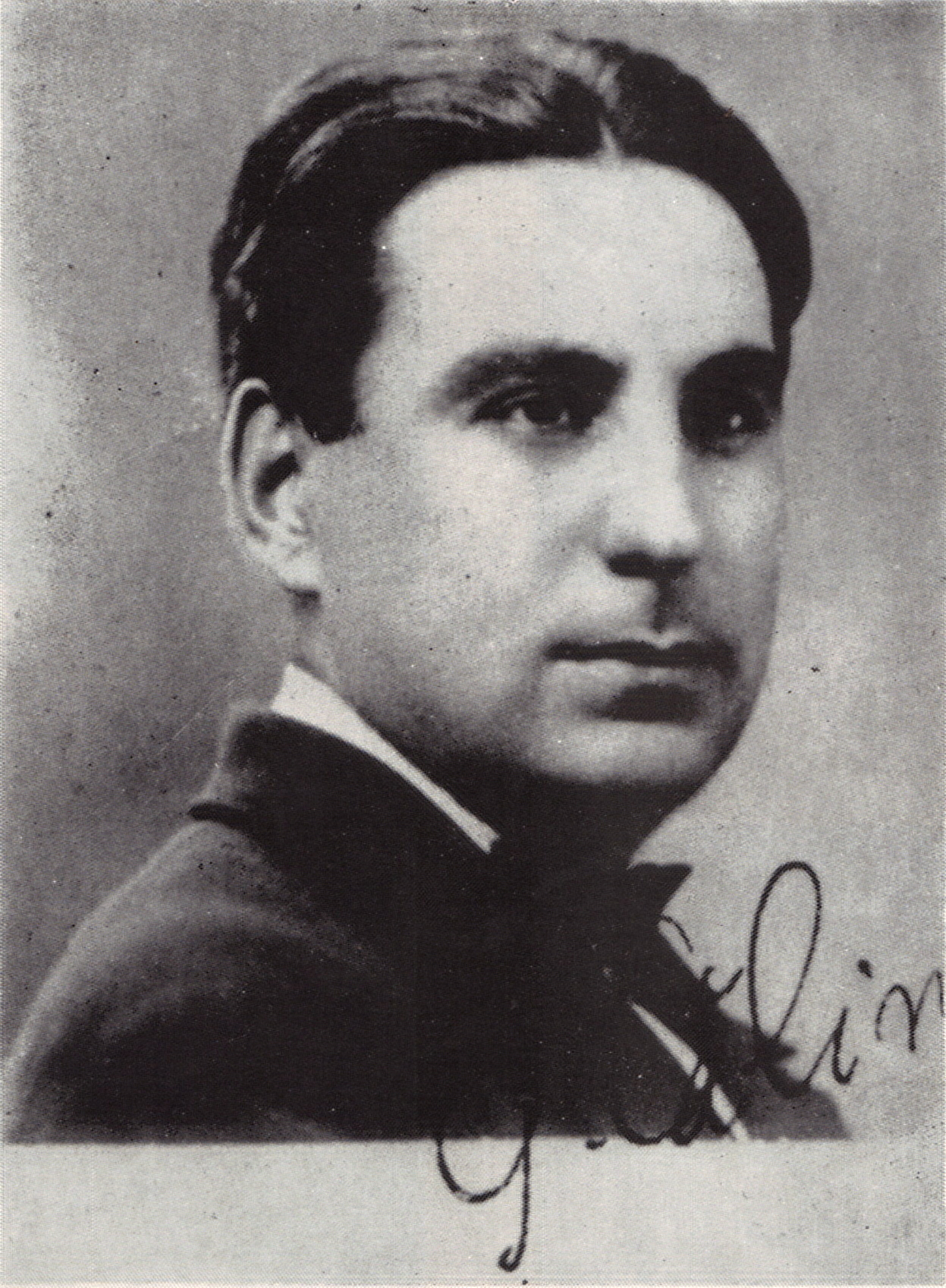
- Born: Gheorghe Vișan; 19 June 1899; Bucharest, Kingdom of Romania
- Died: 12 March 1965 (aged 65); Otopeni, Romanian People's Republic
- Resting place: Bellu Cemetery, Bucharest, Romania
- Education: University of Bucharest
- Occupations: historian; writer; journalist; literary critic; literary historian; biographer; playwright; publicist; academic
- Spouse: Alice Vera Trifu (m. 1928)
- Writing career
- Years active: 1932–1965
- Genre: Romanian literature
- Subject: History of Romanian literature
- Notable works: History of the Romanian Literature; Otilia's Riddle (novel, 1938)

Member of the Assembly of Deputies
- In office 1946–1948

Member of the Great National Assembly
- In office 1948–1965

Personal details
- Party: National Popular Party (before 1949); Independent (1949–1962); Romanian Workers' Party (1962–1965)
- Other political affiliations: People's Democratic Front (1944–1965)
- Movement: Modernism

George Călinescu (Romanian: [ˈdʒe̯ordʒe kəliˈnesku]; 19 June 1899 – 12 March 1965) was a Romanian literary critic, historian, novelist, academician, statesman and journalist, and a writer of classicist and humanist tendencies. He is currently considered one of the most important Romanian literary critics of all time, alongside Titu Maiorescu and Eugen Lovinescu, and is one of the outstanding figures of Romanian literature in the 20th century.

== Biography ==
=== Early childhood ===
George Călinescu, born Gheorghe Vișan on 19 June 1899, was the son of Maria Vișan, a housekeeper. He was raised by his mother's employers, Constantin Călinescu, an employee of the Romanian State Railways, and his wife Maria. The Călinescu family — along with their housekeeper and her son — moved to Botoșani and then to Iași. There, in 1906, Gheorghe Vișan, enrolled at the Carol I primary school, where he studied for two years. In 1907, Maria Vișan accepted the Călinescu family's offer to formally adopt her son, who subsequently took the name Gheorghe Călinescu. This remained his legal name until his death; however, he used the pen name "G. Călinescu" and has become better known as George Călinescu — not only in the Western world, but also in Romania. In 1908, the Călinescu family moved to Bucharest, where George enrolled at the Gheorghe Șincai junior high school.

During his childhood, Călinescu did not know who his real mother was. Finding out that the housekeeper that he used to humiliate was his real mother disturbed him. He tried to hide his real origins for the rest of his life. As a child, he did not excel in anything and was a mediocre student.

=== Ramiro Ortiz ===
Ramiro Ortiz, who taught Italian language and literature at the Faculty of Letters and philosophy, exercised a seminal influence over Călinescu's development. Călinescu developed a strong friendship with Ortiz; years later, he would give Ortiz credit for helping him "seize" a literary education of extraordinary quality. Under Ortiz's guidance Călinescu made his first translations from Italian; during his student days he translated Giovanni Papini's autobiographical novel Un uomo finito and a novella from Boccaccio's Decameron. Again with Ortiz's help, he began work at the literary review Roma, the first issue appearing in January 1921, and travelled to Italy with his university colleagues. Călinescu's first book was written in Italian under the title Alcuni missionari catolici italiani nella Moldavia nei secoli XVII e XVIII, which appeared in 1925 and treated the Vatican's Counter-Reformation propaganda efforts in Baroque Moldavia with heavy reliance on unpublished sources found in the Vatican Archives.

=== Vasile Pârvan ===
If in Bucharest, alongside Ramiro Ortiz, Călinescu realized his vocation as a creative artist and scholar, his attention in Rome was focused on Vasile Pârvan, the director of the Accademia di Romania. Călinescu was captivated by Pârvan's erudition and work ethic, but also by his existential philosophy. Călinescu would always return to this "spiritual father" whenever the difficulties of life seemed to bring him to his knees. Călinescu observed that while Pârvan's natural aptitude was fairly common, his tendency to exercise all the powers of his mind in the ascetic pursuit of an intellectual ideal was transformed into an existential philosophy: Life is transitory, but man can defeat death and oblivion through creation, thus leaving a permanent record of a temporary existence. Călinescu later said, "even if not everyone is in a position to become a Pârvan, everyone can see in him a model, that is to say a way in which he too can accomplish the same renunciations."

=== Academic career ===
In 1936, Călinescu received his doctorate in literature from the University of Iași with a thesis on Avatarii faraonului Tla ("The Avatars of Pharaoh Tla"), a posthumous work of Mihai Eminescu whose value he was the first to publicize. In fact, this thesis was an extract from Călinescu's earlier work, Opera lui Mihai Eminescu ("Mihai Eminescu's Work"), which he wrote out longhand in five copies and sent to the members of the Examination Committee. Afterwards he was named lecturer in Romanian literature at the Faculty of Letters of the University of Iași, after having won the competition for the post with the maximum possible score. In 1945, he transferred to the University of Bucharest, from which point he collaborated on the prestigious Revistă a Fundațiilor Regale, edited by Alexandru Rosetti and Camil Petrescu, until it was closed down when the King abdicated in 1947. After 1947, he was published consistently in magazines such as Gazeta literară (later to become România literară) and Contemporanul, also collaborating on Roma, Universul literar, Viața literară, Sburătorul, and Gândirea.

=== Under Communism ===
Călinescu was deposed from his position at the Faculty of Letters of the University of Bucharest after the establishment in power of the Communist Party of Romania. He was considered a political liability despite having shown evidence of democratic, left-leaning tendencies throughout the interwar period. In the 1950s, however, he became director of the Institutul de teorie literară și folclor ("The Literary Theory and Folklore Institute") and coordinated the institute's publication, Studii și cercetări de istorie literară și folclor ("Literary Theory and Folklore Studies and Research"), from 1952 to 1965. He was reinvited to his post at the Faculty of Letters only in 1961; in the meantime, he produced numerous writings on wide-ranging subjects, from the aesthetic of folk tales to the history of Spanish literature.

== Research, criticism, writings ==
Călinescu was the author of several fundamental texts of Romanian literary history (Viața lui Mihai Eminescu, Opera lui Mihai Eminescu, and Viața lui Ion Creangă among others). After 1945, he published significant writings on world literature (including Impresii asupra literaturii spaniole, and Scriitori străini.) His study Estetica basmului, devoted to the poetics of Romanian folk tales, underlined the range of his interests. From 1932 to 1962, he published monographs, in separate volumes, on such writers as Eminescu, fabulist Ion Creangă, realist novelist Nicolae Filimon, and poet Grigore Alexandrescu, fictionalized biographies, scholarly studies, and essays. He continued presiding over numerous academic and radio conferences and writing thousands of critical reviews until his death in 1965.

=== Literary work ===
Călinescu produced heavily descriptive realist novels in the mode of Honoré de Balzac, often with obvious polemical undertones lurking beneath their apparently objective style. The novel he considered his best, Enigma Otiliei, narrates an unhappy love story; Cartea nunții is a disquisition on marriage; and Bietul Ioanide and Scrinul negru present the problems of intellectuals, all against the backdrop of interwar and immediate postwar Romania. Călinescu also wrote poems (Lauda lucrurilor) and plays (Șun, mit mongol) while continuing to practice journalism, although Cronicile mizantropului abruptly became Cronicile optimistului after the Communists seized power in 1947.

=== Civic and political activity ===
An intellectual with liberal-left ideas who nonetheless proved flexible enough to write praises of the King under Carol's dictatorship, Călinescu outwardly adhered to the new Communist ideology after 1947, likely noting the practical advantages of such a shift in loyalties.

He made numerous research trips to the Soviet Union (Kiev, Moscova, Leningrad appeared in 1949) and the People's Republic of China (Am fost în China nouă, in 1953), publishing his impressions in these two volumes.

From 1948 to 1953, Călinescu was mistrusted and marginalized, despite being named to the Academy of the Romanian People's Republic in 1949; even after de-Stalinization began in the Soviet Union in 1953, the Romanian establishment continued to favor the "wooden-tongued," socialist realist models the Soviets had begun to abandon. Călinescu's total inability to write convincingly in this style resulted in his continued perception as a reactionary conservative. Nonetheless, he was invited to resume his columns on a permanent basis in 1956, marking the beginning of his rehabilitation. Before the end of his life, all of his works, with the exception of his monumental Istoria, were issued in new editions. Istoria would appear (to great acclaim) only in the 1980s, through the efforts of Călinescu's assistant Alexandru Piru.

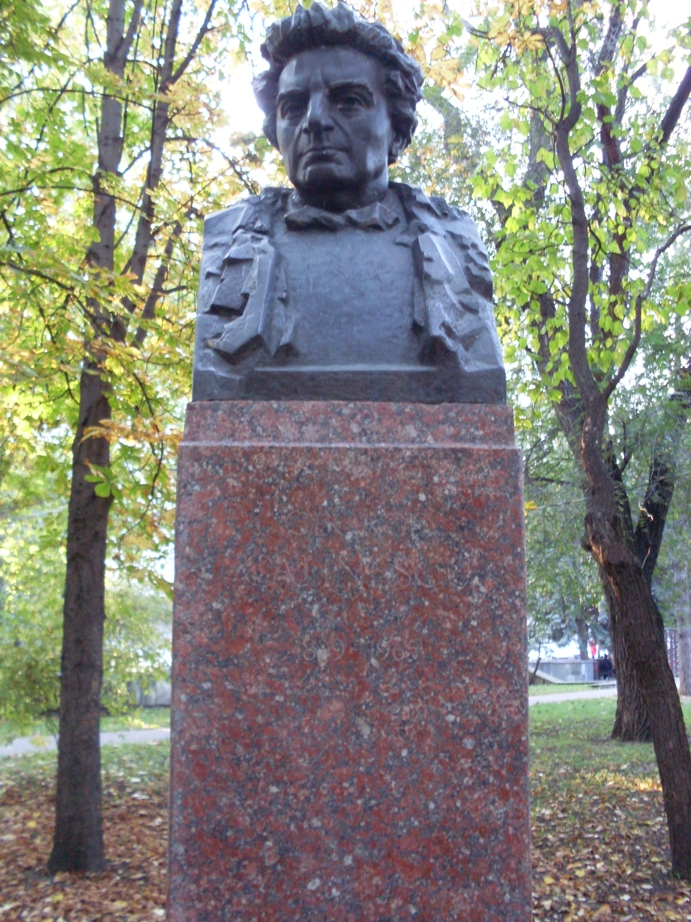
Călinescu bust in Chișinău, Moldova

=== Final years ===
In November 1964, George Călinescu was diagnosed with cirrhosis of the liver and sent for treatment to the sanatorium at Otopeni. On 12 March 1965, in the middle of the night, he died, leaving behind, in the words of Geo Bogza, "a body of work fundamental to the Romanian people." He was buried at Bellu Cemetery, in Bucharest.

=== Post-Communist reputation ===
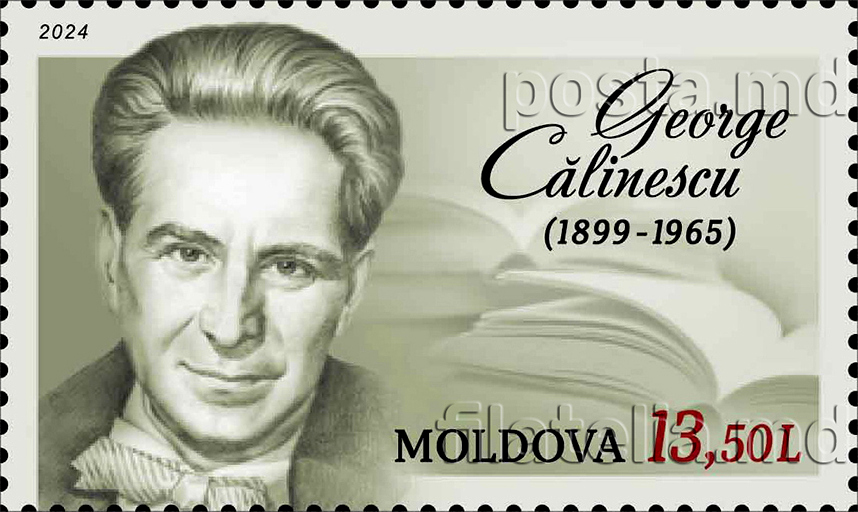
Călinescu on a 2024 stamp of Moldova

After 1989 there began a period in which Călinescu's civic activity under the Communist regime was called into question, and in which he was accused of collaborating with the authorities, notably by his former assistant Adrian Marino. A veritable "trial by press" resulted in which all of his works and activities were systematically reevaluated, proving Călinescu's perennial value and ability to offer new generations new perspectives on his own times and the whole history of Romanian literature.

== Works ==
=== Studies in Foreign Languages ===
- Alcuni missionari catolici italiani nella Moldavia nella secoli XVII e XVIII (On Some Italian Catholic Missionaries in the Moldavia of the 17th and 18th centuries), 1925.

=== Studies on Aesthetics and World Literature ===
- Principii de estetică ("Principles of Aesthetics"), 1939
- Impresii asupra literaturii spaniole ("Impressions on Spanish Literature"), 1946
- Sensul clasicismului ("The Meaning of Classicism"), 1946
- Studii și conferințe ("Studies and Conferences"), 1956
- Scriitori străini ("Foreign Writers"), 1967

=== Poetry ===
- Poezii ("Poetry"), 1937
- Lauda lucrurilor ("In Praise of Things"), 1963
- Lauda zapezii ("In Praise of Snow"), 1965

=== Drama ===
- Șun, mit mongol sau Calea neturburată ("Șun, a Mongol Myth"), 1940
- Ludovic al XIX-lea ("Louis XIX"), 1964
- Teatru ("Theatre"), 1965

=== Novels ===
- Cartea nunții ("The Wedding Book"), 1933
- Enigma Otiliei ("Otilia's Riddle"), 1938
- Trei nuvele ("Three Novellas"), 1949
- Bietul Ioanide ("Poor Ioanide"), 1953
- Scrinul negru ("The Black Chest of Drawers"), 1965

=== History and literary criticism ===
- Viața lui Mihai Eminescu ("Mihai Eminescu's Life"), 1932
- Opera lui Mihai Eminescu ("The Works of Mihai Eminescu"), 1934
- Viața lui Ion Creangă ("Ion Creangă's Life"), 1938
- Istoria literaturii române de la origini până în prezent ("The History of Romanian Literature from its Origins to the Present"), 1941
- Istoria literaturii române. Compendiu ("The History of Romanian Literature. A Compendium"), 1945
- Universul poeziei ("The Universe of Poetry"), 1947
- Nicolae Filimon, 1959
- Gr. M. Alecsandrescu, 1962
- Ion Creangă; Viața și opera ("Ion Creangă; His Life and Works"), 1964
- Vasile Alecsandri, 1965

=== Journalism ===
- Cronicile optimistului ("The Chronicles of an Optimist"), 1964
- Ulysse ("Ulysses"), 1967

=== Travel journals ===
- Kiev, Moscova, Leningrad (Kiev, Moscow, Leningrad), 1949
- Am fost în China nouă ("I've Been to the New China"), 1953
