= The Failure =

The Failure may refer to the following topics:

- A Man — Finished, also known as The Failure, 1913 novel by Giovanni Papini
- The Failure (1915 film), 1915 silent American film directed by Christy Cabanne
- The Failure (1917 film), 1917 silent British film directed by Henry Edwards
