= James Hulme Canfield =

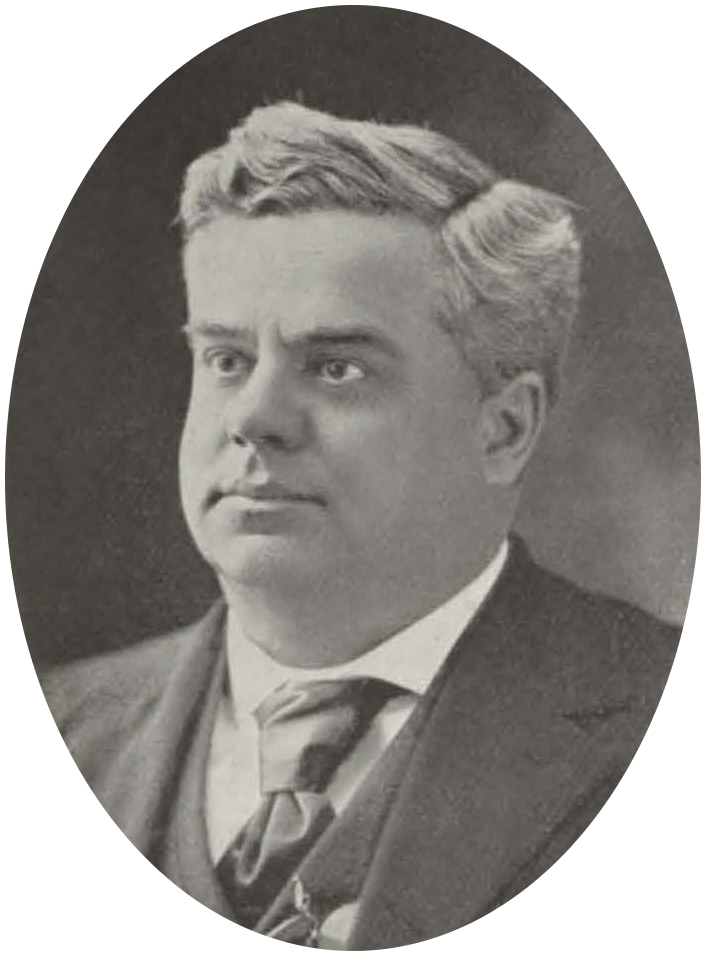

4th President of Ohio State University
- In office July 1, 1895 – June 30, 1899
- Preceded by: William H. Scott
- Succeeded by: William Oxley Thompson

5th Chancellor of the University of Nebraska
- In office July 1, 1891 – July 1, 1895
- Preceded by: Charles Edwin Bessey
- Succeeded by: George Edwin MacLean

Personal details
- Born: March 18, 1847 Delaware, Ohio, US
- Died: March 29, 1909 (aged 62) New York, New York, US
- Spouse: Flavia Camp Canfield
- Children: Dorothy Canfield Fisher
- Education: Williams College
- Occupation: Scholar, academic administrator

James Hulme Canfield (March 18, 1847 – March 29, 1909), born in Delaware, Ohio, the son of Rev. E. H. and Martha (Hulme) Canfield, was the fourth president of Ohio State University and fifth Chancellor of the University of Nebraska.

Raised in New York City, Canfield attended Williams College and read law in Jackson, Michigan, before briefly practicing in St. Joseph, Michigan. He was on the faculty of the University of Kansas, teaching broadly in the humanities, until moving to the University of Nebraska, where he served as chancellor. In 1895 Canfield returned to Ohio to become president of Ohio State University. He resigned the position in 1899 and became chief librarian at Columbia University, where remained until his death. Hulme was also a founding member of the American Library Institute.

He received the honorary degree Doctor of Letters (D.Litt.) from the University of Oxford in October 1902, in connection with the tercentenary of the Bodleian Library.

He married Flavia Camp on June 24, 1873; their children included Dorothy Canfield Fisher.

James Hulme Canfield died at St. Luke's Hospital in New York City on March 29, 1909.

Canfield Hall dormitory at Ohio State is named in his honor, as is the Canfield Administration Building at the University of Nebraska–Lincoln.

Academic offices
Preceded by William Henry Scott	Ohio State University President; July 1, 1895 – June 30, 1899	Succeeded by William Oxley Thompson
