= Understood Betsy =

1916 children's novel by Dorothy Canfield Fisher

- First Edition cover
- Author: Dorothy Canfield Fisher
- Illustrator: Ada C. Williamson
- Language: English
- Publisher: THE CENTURY CO.
- Publication date: 1916
- Publication place: USA
- Media type: Print (Hardcover)
- Pages: 272
- ISBN: 978-0-8050-6073-7

Understood Betsy is a 1916 novel for children by Dorothy Canfield Fisher.

== Plot summary ==
Elizabeth Ann lives with her great aunt Harriet and her Aunt Frances in an unnamed city. Imaginative, anxious and apparently fragile, Elizabeth Ann has been spoiled and overprotected by Frances, an intellectual, in an effort to “understand” children. When Harriet falls ill, then aunts must move to a warmer climate. They leave Elizabeth Ann behind, believing that their urban relatives, the Lathrops, will take care of her until Harriet is well. The Lathrops, however, invent a case of scarlet fever to avoid taking Elizabeth Ann in. She is instead sent a thousand miles away to a rural Vermont branch of the family, the Putney cousins, who had been kind enough to offer.

At the Putney farmhouse Elizabeth Ann meets her plump Aunt Abigail and her tall, strong Cousin Ann, and is fed all the food she can eat, in contrast to Aunt Frances’ planned diets. She is given a kitten to care for and names it Eleanor.

Elizabeth Ann is astonished to find that the local school consists of just a dozen children of all ages. Elizabeth is encouraged to read at 7th grade level, but her arithmetic is second grade. She quickly acquires a worshipper in Molly, a first-year Elizabeth Ann is encouraged to help with her reading.

Elizabeth Ann is delighted by Abigail’s recollections of a time before stoves, clocks and matches. Abigail teaches Elizabeth Ann how to cook, and to handle hot pans for the first time. Evenings are spent playing checkers, reading aloud to the family and hearing the Putney’s folk wisdom, some good, some apocryphal.

Aunt Frances sends a letter stating she is horrified that Elizabeth Ann has been sent to the country, but that this couldn’t be helped while Harriet remained ill; “Try to bear it for the sake of your distracted, loving Aunt Frances.”

Elizabeth Ann must adjust to quite different standards of achievement. Cousin Ann, busy extracting maple syrup (enjoyed “waxed”, or crystallized by rapid cooling in snow) is quite indifferent to Elizabeth Ann's failure during a verbal test at school. “I guess Hemlock Mountain will stand right there just the same even if you did forget to put a b in ‘doubt.’”

Molly comes to live with the Putneys when her mother falls ill, and the two girls share a bed in Elizabeth Ann's own room. Elizabeth Ann demonstrates responsibility of care and presence of mind by saving the little girl after Molly tumbles into a hole.

Elizabeth Ann, hereafter referred to as "Betsy" in the book, organizes a sewing circle to provide clothes for Elias Brewster, a boy abused by his drunken father. Ralph turns out to be a compassionate if undemonstrative boy, who contributes a cap, and ensures that Elias is clean enough to do the clothes credit. Unfortunately the clothes are sold by Elias’ father for drinking money. Angered by this, a kindly farmer, Elmer Pond, adopts Elias, an outcome at which even Ralph smiles.

Elizabeth Ann (Betsy) celebrates her tenth birthday at the Necronsett Valley Fair. Looking in a full-length mirror for the first time since she left the city, she is astonished to see “a dark-eyed, red-cheeked, sturdy little girl, standing very straight on two strong legs, holding her head high and free, her dark eyes looking out brightly from her tanned face.” When her and Molly's lift home is unexpectedly called away by a livestock emergency, Elizabeth Ann earns the train fare home by covering a vendor’s absence at a doughnut stand. As Cousin Ann says, “I think I never heard of a child’s doing a smarter, grittier thing ... and I don’t care if she does hear me say so!”

When in October Aunt Frances writes that she will resume care of Elizabeth Ann, she resolves to leave the farm rather than hurt the feelings of the woman who raised her. But with Harriet recovered and now to be cared for by an Aunt Rachel (returned from missionary work in China), Aunt Frances is to be married. Frances has offered to do the right thing, but she and Elizabeth Ann both are intuitive enough to pick up on the other’s real desires; Elizabeth wants to stay with the Putneys and Frances wants to travel with her new husband.

Their roles have changed. It is the confident, competent Elizabeth Ann who has the sense of duty, and Frances who is to be protected.
