= The Devil (Papini book) =

1953 book by Giovanni Papini

- Author: Giovanni Papini
- Original title: Il diavolo
- Translator: Adrienne Foulke
- Language: Italian
- Publisher: Vallecchi
- Publication date: 1953
- Publication place: Italy
- English publication date: 1954
- Pages: 398

The Devil: Notes for Future Diabology (Italian: Il diavolo. Appunti per una futura diabologia) is a 1953 book by the Italian writer Giovanni Papini.

== Summary ==
The Devil is about the Devil, whose theological history Papini traces from ancient Egypt. Papini argues that the Devil is part of the creation that God loves, lays out a thesis about Lucifer's rebellion, and—based on readings of Origen and selected early Christian texts—predicts that the Devil will ultimately be saved and abolish Hell. The book sees Papini return to the problem of evil, which had been the subject of two mystery plays he published in 1906.

== Publication ==
The Devil was Papini's 40th book and was published in Italian by Vallecchi in 1953. The English translation by Adrienne Foulke was published in 1954. The book and its theses were condemned by the Holy See.
