= The Brimming Cup =

1921 novel by Dorothy Canfield

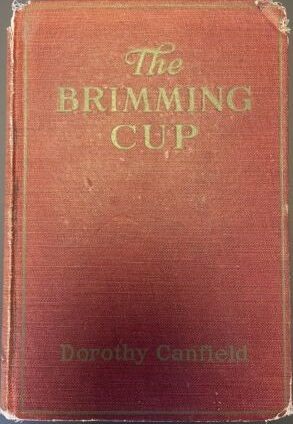
- Author: Dorothy Canfield
- Language: English
- Genre: Novel
- Publisher: Harcourt, Brace & Co.
- Publication date: March 10, 1921
- Media type: Print (hardcover)
- Pages: 409

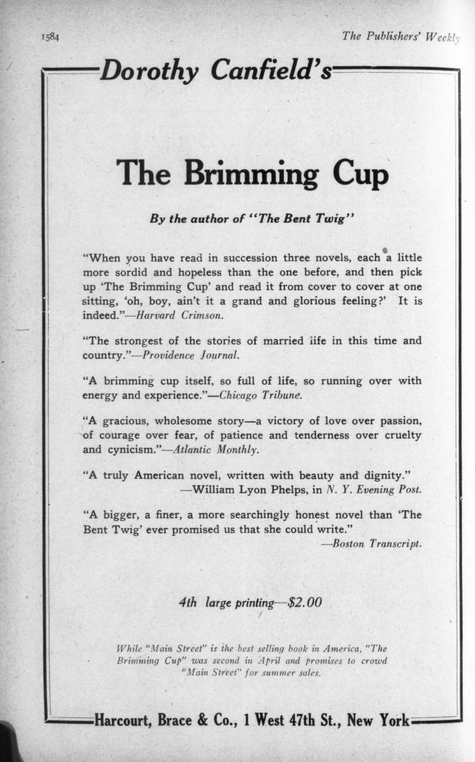
May 1921 advertisement for novel in Publishers Weekly.

The Brimming Cup is a novel by Dorothy Canfield Fisher that was the second best-selling novel in the United States in 1921.

The novel was first serialized in McCall's from October 1920 through March 1921 and then published in book form on March 10, 1921.

The novel was Fisher's most commercially successful novel. Its positive setting of life in small town America (Ashley, Vermont) was marketed as a contrast to the successful Main Street (1920) by Sinclair Lewis, which the best selling novel in the United States in 1921, just ahead of Fisher.

A passage of the novel discusses unfair treatment of blacks in Georgia, and has been called "the first modern best-seller to present criticism of racial prejudice."
