= A Man — Finished =

1913 novel by Giovanni Papini

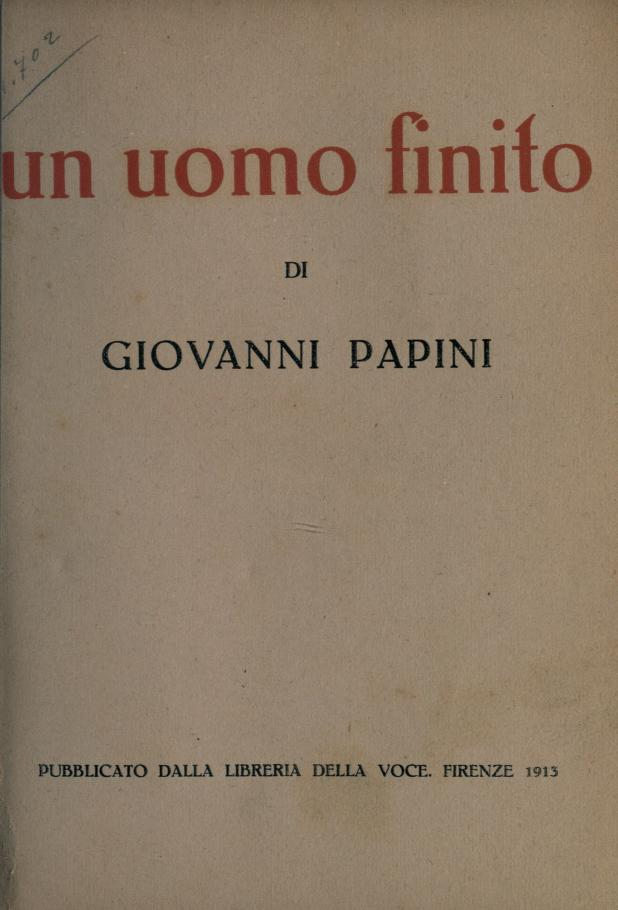
- Author: Giovanni Papini
- Original title: Un uomo finito
- Translator: Mary Prichard Agnetti (UK); Virginia Pope (US)
- Language: Italian
- Publisher: Libreria della Voce
- Publication date: 1913
- Publication place: Italy
- English publication date: 1924
- Pages: 303

A Man — Finished (Italian: Un uomo finito), published as The Failure in the United States, is a 1913 autobiographical novel by the Italian writer Giovanni Papini.

== Plot ==
Through an unnamed protagonist, Giovanni Papini tells a fictionalised version of his life from childhood until the age of 30, when he wrote the book. The protagonist is alienated as a child and turns to knowledge, which he treats as a weapon against the world. As a young adult, he sees himself as a born revolutionary, gathers a circle of like-minded people and develops an increasingly solipsistic philosophy centred on the mind in opposition to God and humanity. He founds the journal Leonardo as an organ for promoting his views and attacking Christianity. His rationalistic views and celebration of knowledge lead him to an irrational love of power and he desires to write a great literary work that will elevate him above other humans. When all his grand plans fail, he turns to self-pity and blames his surroundings and associates. In an attempt to justify his failure and make it heroic, he writes a book: Un uomo finito.

== Major themes ==
According to Papini, the protagonist's primary sin is his inability to grasp that he is an evil person. The book parallels its protagonist's life, including Papini's autobiographical elements, with the career of the Devil. It interweaves the Devil as a symbol for humanity's demonic sides and the protagonist's life as a symbol for the Devil.

== Reception ==
A Man — Finished is Papini's most famous book. According to Daniela Orlandi in the Encyclopedia of Italian Literary Studies (2007), it is "unanimously considered his greatest achievement", and its best features are "its readability, its characteristic as an epoch-making document, and, last but not least, the fact that it constitutes a sort of testament to the idealism of some intellectuals who would later subscribe to Italy's nationalist and Fascist movements".

The screenwriter Cesare Zavattini was deeply affected by the book when he read it at the age of 17. He said he read it in one night after which he changed his lifestyle, stopped feeling aimless and began to write with an informal and seemingly spontaneous tone, adopted from Papini.
