= Dorothy Canfield Fisher =

American author and social activist (1879–1958)

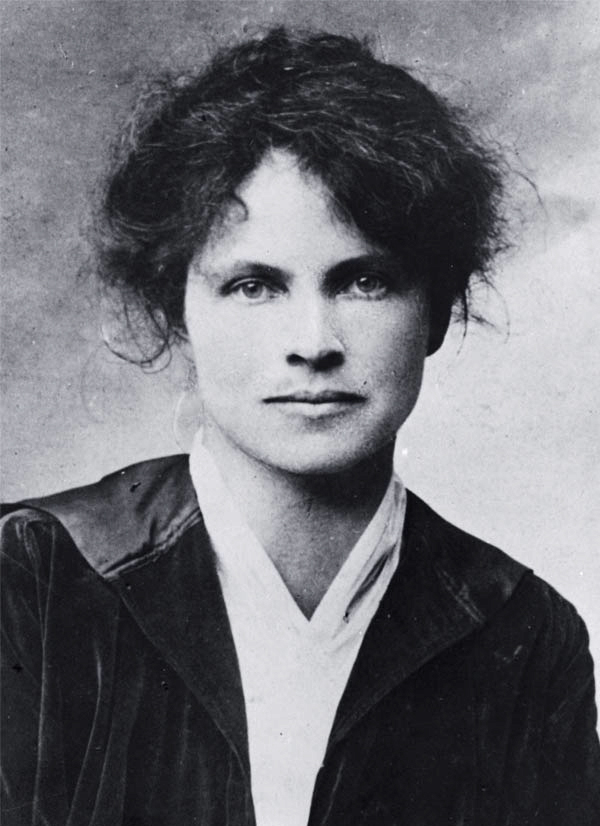
- Canfield Fisher as a young woman.
- Born: Dorothea Frances Canfield; February 17, 1879; Lawrence, Kansas, U.S.
- Died: November 9, 1958 (aged 79); Arlington, Vermont
- Other names: Dorothea Frances Canfield
- Occupations: Writer, educator
- Known for: Montessori method; adult education; Dorothy Canfield Fisher Children's Book Award
- Spouse: John Redwood Fisher (m. 1907)
- Children: 2

Dorothy Canfield Fisher (February 17, 1879 – November 9, 1958) was an educational reformer, social activist, and best-selling American author in the early 20th century. She strongly supported women's rights, racial equality, and lifelong education. Eleanor Roosevelt named her one of the ten most influential women in the United States. Her writing helped increase understanding of the Montessori method of child-rearing in the U.S.; she presided over the country's first adult education program; and her service as a member of the Book of the Month Club selection committee from 1925 to 1951 helped shape literary tastes in the U.S.

== Biography ==
Dorothea Frances Canfield – named for Dorothea Brooke of the novel Middlemarch – was born on February 17, 1879, in Lawrence, Kansas to James Hulme Canfield and Flavia Camp, an artist and writer. From 1877 to 1891 her father was a University of Kansas professor with responsibility for various historical studies, and finally president of the National Education Association. Later he was chancellor of the University of Nebraska, president of Ohio State University, and librarian at Columbia University. Canfield Fisher is most closely associated with Vermont, where she and her mother made trips to the family home and where she spent her adult life. Vermont also served as the setting for many of her books.

In 1899 Canfield received a Bachelor of Arts degree from Ohio State University, where she was a member of Kappa Kappa Gamma. She went on to study Romance languages at the University of Paris and Columbia University (where her father was Librarian from 1899) and earned a doctoral degree from Columbia with the dissertation Corneille and Racine in English (1904). With George Rice Carpenter from Columbia she co-wrote English Rhetoric and Composition (1906). She was the first woman to receive an honorary degree from Dartmouth College and received others from the University of Nebraska, Middlebury College, Swarthmore College, Smith College, Williams College, Ohio State University, and the University of Vermont.

She married John Redwood Fisher in 1907, and they had two children, a daughter, Sally, and a son, Jimmy.

In 1911, Canfield Fisher visited the "children's houses" in Rome established by Maria Montessori. Much impressed, she joined the cause to bring the method back to the U.S., translating Montessori's book into English and writing five of her own: three nonfiction and two novels.

Another concern of Canfield Fisher was her war work. She followed her husband to France in 1916 during World War I and while raising her young children in Paris worked to establish a Braille press for blinded veterans. She also established a convalescent home for refugee French children from the invaded areas; continuing her relief work after the war, she earned citations of appreciation from Eleanor Roosevelt, Madame Chiang Kai-shek, and the government of Denmark.

== Activism ==
Canfield Fisher engaged in social activism in many aspects of education and politics. She managed the first adult education program in the U.S. She did war-relief work in 1917 in France, establishing the Bidart Home for Children for refugees and organizing an effort to print books in Braille for blinded combat veterans. In 1919, she was appointed to the State Board of Education of Vermont to help improve rural public education. She spent years promoting education and rehabilitation/reform in prisons, especially women's prisons.

After the war, she was the head of the U.S. committee that led to the pardoning of conscientious objectors in 1921, and sponsored financial and emigration assistance to Jewish educators, professionals, and intellectuals.

After her son was killed in World War II, she arranged a fellowship at Harvard Medical School for the two Philippine surgeons who tried to save his life.

== Affiliations ==
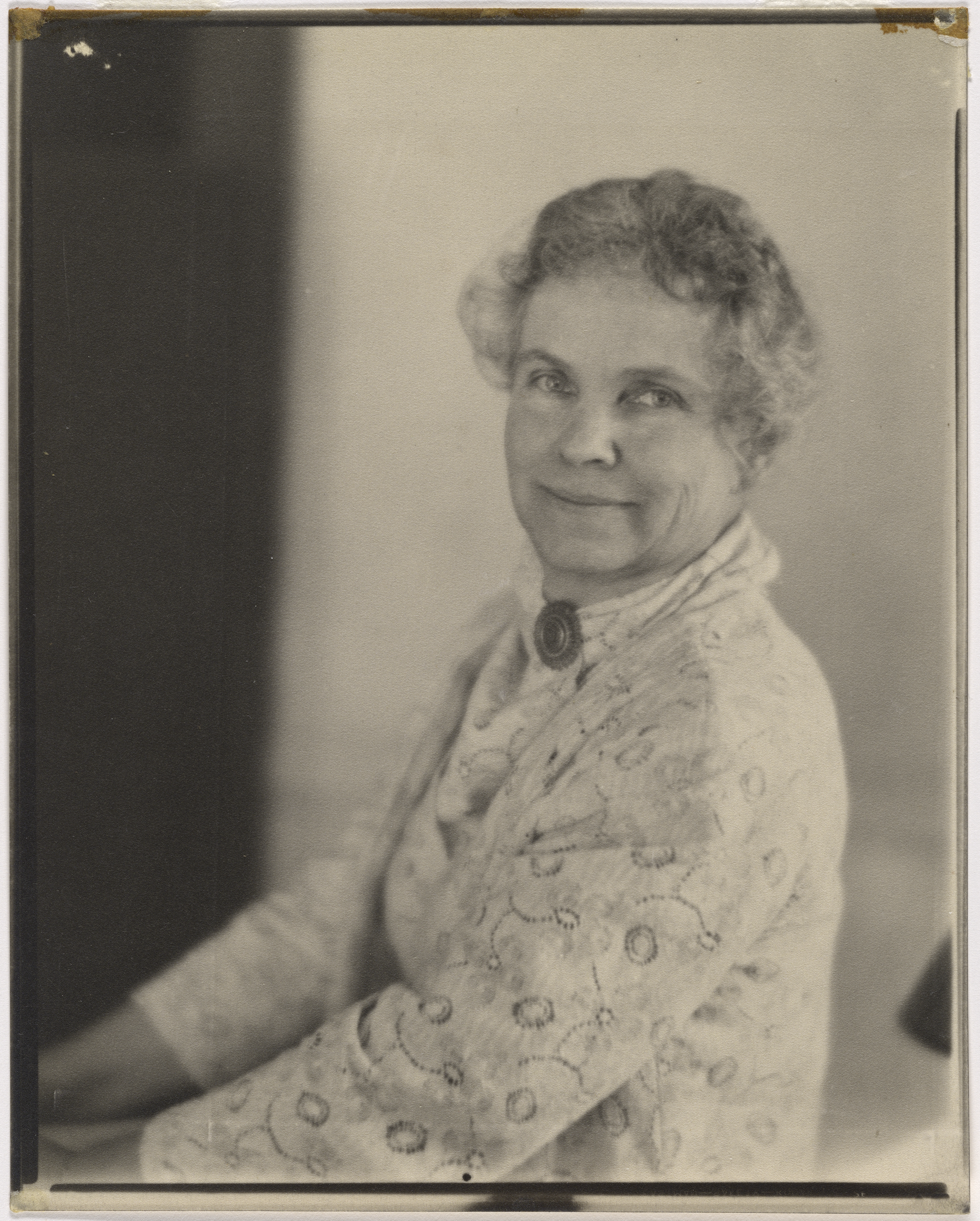
Dorothy Canfield Fisher, photo by Clara Sipprell (1940)

Canfield Fisher and Willa Cather's decades-long relationship intensely revolved around their writing. Their letters, from 1899 to 1947, reveal a lasting and complicated friendship.

Cather wrote a short story that may have satirized Canfield's mother, called "Flavia and Her Artists"—sparking ten years of interrupted friendship between Canfield Fisher and Cather. Other writers who corresponded with Canfield Fisher included Henry Seidel Canby, Richard Wright, Heywood Broun, Witter Bynner, Isak Dinesen, and Robert Frost.

Canfield Fisher worked with the following organizations over the course of her life.

- Adult Education Association
- American Youth Commission of the American Council of Education, 1936–1940
- Book of the Month Club Committee of Selection, 1926 until 1951
- Honorary Committee of the Women's International League for Peace and Freedom, 1935
- The Lighthouse Organization, 1917
- National Institute of Arts and Letters, 1931
- Vermont Board of Education, 1921

== Personal life and death ==
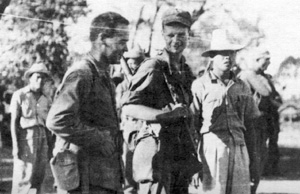
Son, Captain James Fisher, in the Philippines during World War II.

Her daughter Sally was born in 1909. She married John Paul Scott and they lived in Bar Harbor, Maine. By 1958 she had published 18 children's books as Sally Scott. (Note: See Sally Scott at Library of Congress, with 25 library catalog records. Unfortunately Sally Scott is not identified, or authorized in the sense of authority control, by the Library. The name is partly undifferentiated; the 25 hits may be records of works created by more than one Sally Scott. Evidently they are 21 US publications 1943–1963 created by writer Sally Scott and an illustrator (16 with Beth Krush); 4 UK publications 1981–1987 created by writer-illustrator Sally Scott, one with another writer. Vivian Scott is another undifferentiated name, credited by 3 records in the catalog as of February 2015. One of them is for a children's picture book presumably created by Fisher's daughter Vivian Scott: The Potted Witch (Harcourt, 1957).) Canfield Fisher's granddaughter Vivian Scott also writes children's books.

Her son James (Jimmy) was born in 1913 and during World War II became a surgeon and captain in the U.S. Army. He served with the Alamo Scouts for three months at the end of 1944. Afterwards, his Ranger unit rescued Allied prisoners of war at Cabanatuan in the Philippines. Fisher died on Luzon, January 31, 1945.

Canfield Fisher died at the age of 79 in Arlington, Vermont in 1958. Her husband died the following year.

== Legacy ==
Until 2020, the Dorothy Canfield Fisher Children's Book Award was awarded to new American children's books whose winner was chosen by the vote of child readers. In 2017, an Abenaki educator lobbied the Vermont Department of Libraries to pull Fisher's name from the children's literature award, which was created in the state over half a century ago. Judy Dow claimed that Fisher stereotyped French Canadians and Native Americans in her works of fiction in a manner consonant with the eugenics movement that promoted cleansing Vermont of people considered genetically less desirable in the 1920s and 1930s. No direct connection with the eugenics movement was established. The Vermont State Board of Libraries recommended dropping her name from the award on grounds that "it was no longer relevant to today's young people". The state librarian announced in 2019 that the award would receive a new name. The Vermont State Library announced in 2020 that the Dorothy Canfield Fisher Children's Book Award would be renamed the "Vermont Golden Dome Book Award," a name selected by Vermont schoolchildren after a student vote.

== Works ==
=== Books ===
Canfield Fisher spoke five languages fluently, and in addition to writing novels, short stories, memoirs, and educational works, she wrote extensively as a literary critic and translator. For tax purposes, her novels were written as "Canfield," her non-fiction as "Fisher."

Her best-known work today is probably Understood Betsy, a children's book about a little orphaned girl who is sent to live with her cousins in Vermont. Although the book can be read purely for pleasure, it also describes a schoolhouse which is run much in the style of the Montessori method. Another of her books, The Home-Maker, was reprinted by Anita Miller's Academy Chicago Publishers calling it "way ahead of its time." In all, she wrote 22 novels and 18 works of non-fiction.

The Brimming Cup, her most commercially successful novel, the number two bestseller in 1921 (following only Sinclair Lewis’ Main Street), contains a passage discussing unfair treatment of blacks in Georgia; the book has been called "the first modern best-seller to present criticism of racial prejudice." (As a trustee of Howard University, Canfield Fisher, noted as Ph.B., PhD., D.Litt., delivered the 1946 commencement address.)

William Lyon Phelps said "All her novels are autobiographical, being written exclusively out of her own experience and observation."

=== Novels ===
- Gunhild (1907) (contrasting Norwegian and American values)
- The Squirrel-Cage (1912) (the first of her treatments of marriage)
- The Bent Twig (1915)
- The Real Motive (1916).
- Fellow Captains (1916) (with Sarah N. Cleghorn)
- Understood Betsy (1917)
- Home Fires in France (1918)
- The Day of Glory (1919)
- The Brimming Cup (1919)
- Rough-Hewn (1922)
- The Home-Maker (1924) (reprinted by Persephone Books in 1999)
- Her Son's Wife (1926)
- The Deepening Stream (1930) (reprinted by Persephone Books in 2021)
- Bonfire (1933)
- Seasoned Timber (1939)

=== Short story collections ===
- Hillsboro People (1915)
- The Real Motive (1916)
- Raw Material (1923)
- Made-to-Order Stories (1925)
- Four Square (1949)
- The Bedquilt and Other Stories (1997)

=== Non-fiction ===
- Corneille and Racine in England (1904) (dissertation)
- English Rhetoric and Composition (1906) – with G.R. Carpenter
- What Shall We Do Now? (with others) (1906)
- A Montessori Mother (1912)
- A Montessori Manual (1913)
- Mothers and Children (1914)
- Self-Reliance 1916
- Life of Christ 1923 (by Giovanni Papini, freely trans. from the Italian by Dorothy Canfield Fisher)
- Why Stop Learning? (1927)
- Work: What It Has Meant to Men through the Ages (1931) (by Adriano Tilgher, trans. from the Italian by Dorothy Canfield Fisher)
- Tourists Accommodated 1932
- Nothing Ever Happens and How It Does 1940. (with Sarah N. Cleghorn)
- Tell Me a Story 1940
- "Hiker's Philosophy" chapter of Footpath in the Wilderness 1941. (with W. Storrs, James P. Taylor, Charles E. Crane, Wallace Cady, George D. Aiken, Herbert Wheaton Congdon, Robert C. Anderson, and Richard L. Brown)
- Our Young Folks 1943
- American Portraits 1946
- Paul Revere and the Minute Men 1950
- Our Independence and the Constitution 1950
- A Fair World for All 1952
- Vermont Tradition 1953
- Memories of My Home Town 1955 (Republished and expanded as "Memories of Arlington, Vermont" 1957)
- And Long Remember 1959
