= Clemente Rebora =

Italian Catholic priest and poet (1885–1957)

Clemente Rebora (6 January 1885 – 1 November 1957) was an Italian Catholic priest and poet from Milan. He received a degree in Italian literature in Milan. In the early 1900s he worked for the magazines La Voce, Rivista d’Italia and La Riviera Ligure.

His book Frammenti Lirici (Italian: Lyrical Fragments) was published in 1913. From 1913 to 1922, he wrote anonymous "Songs" and lyrics. After World War I Rebora began to work as a teacher.

Previously an atheist, he had a spiritual crisis in 1928 and became a devout Catholic. In 1930, he entered a seminary; in 1936, he became a Rosminian priest. After this, his work became religious in orientation, but his work is popular beyond Catholic circles for its treatment of metaphysics and physics. He is somewhat controversial for his friendship with Julius Evola, but the friendship seems to have been largely based on his hope that Julius would convert to Christianity. When this hope grew dim the friendship declined.
