= Flavia Camp Canfield =

American artist and author

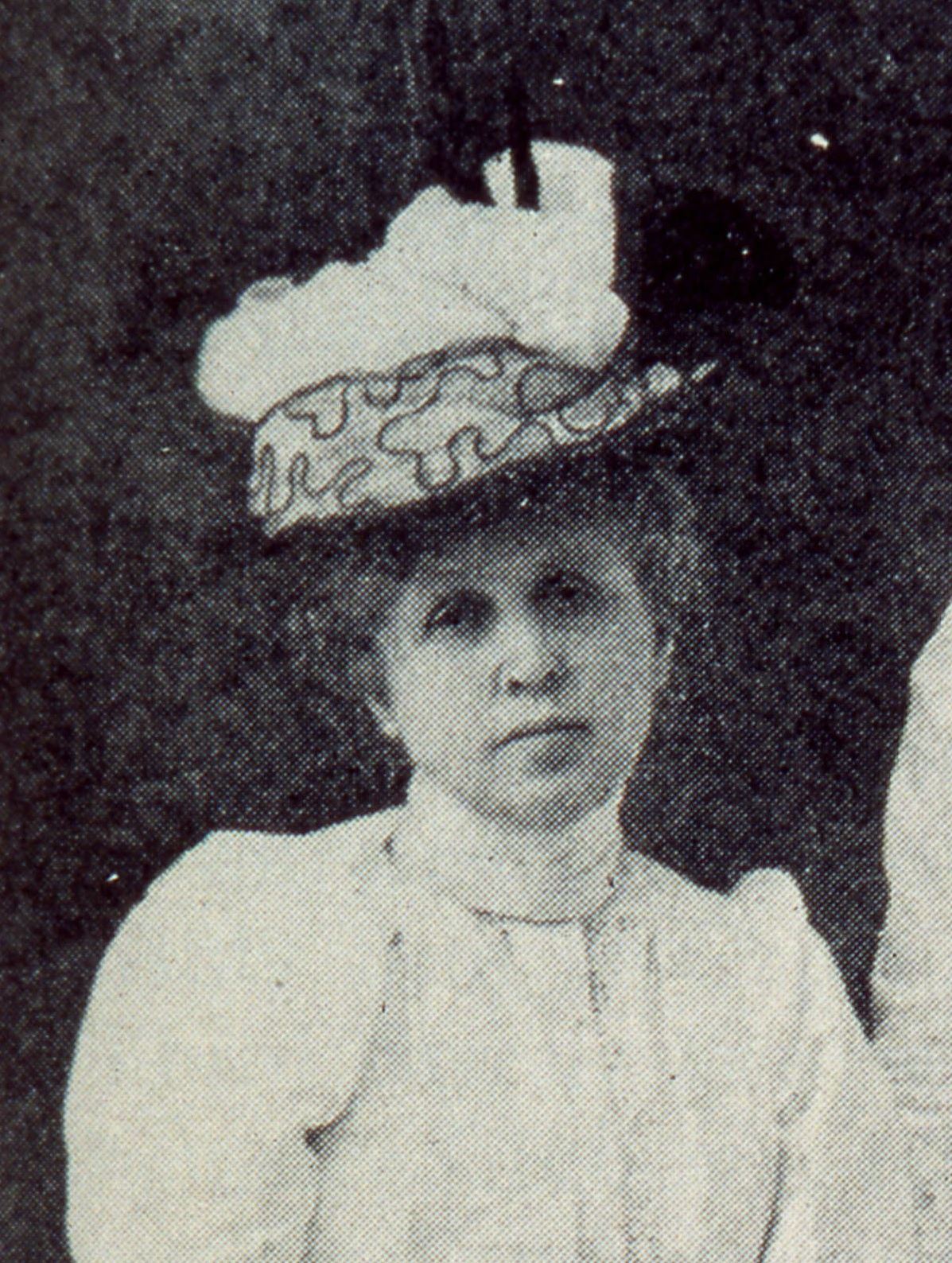
- Born: Flavia Camp; January 28, 1844; Black Earth, Wisconsin
- Died: August 12, 1930 (aged 86)
- Spouse: James Hulme Canfield (m. 1873–1909)
- Relatives: Dorothy Canfield Fisher (daughter)

Flavia Camp Canfield (January 28, 1844 – August 12, 1930) was an American artist, author, and founder of the Columbus Federation of Women's Clubs.

== Early life ==
Flavia Camp was raised in Black Earth, Wisconsin by her mother and step-father, the Congregational pastor Asa A. Allen, with a combined total of fifteen siblings, half-siblings, and step-siblings. She taught in a local school in her late teens, and went to the University of Wisconsin in 1863, the first year it admitted women.

On June 24, 1873 she married James Hulme Canfield with whom she had a son and in 1879 a daughter Dorothy. Although she didn't speak any foreign languages, she made many trips to Europe with her daughter, for example studying art for a year in Paris.

== Organisational work ==
Canfield became interested in the nascent Women's Club Movement, and accordingly while her husband was president of Ohio State University, she began a campaign to organize and federate clubs in the Columbus region. In all she founded 26 such clubs and the Columbus Federation of Women's Clubs. She was the first president (1895–97) of the Ohio State University Women's Club, and was president of the Ohio Federation of Women's Clubs from 1898–1900.

Canfield continued her interest in the arts as president of The Columbus Art Association, in which role she "broadened the policy of the association and enlarged the membership".

== Literary legacy ==
Her published novels include The Kidnapped Campers: A Story of Out-of-Doors (1908), The Refugee Family: A Story for Girls (1919), The Big Tent (1921), and Around the World at Eighty (1925).

Being made the subject of satire in "Flavia and Her Artists", a short story by her daughter Dorothy's friend Willa Cather, was probably the cause for the 10-year rift between Dorothy and Cather.
