= Il crepuscolo dei filosofi =

1906 book by Giovanni Papini

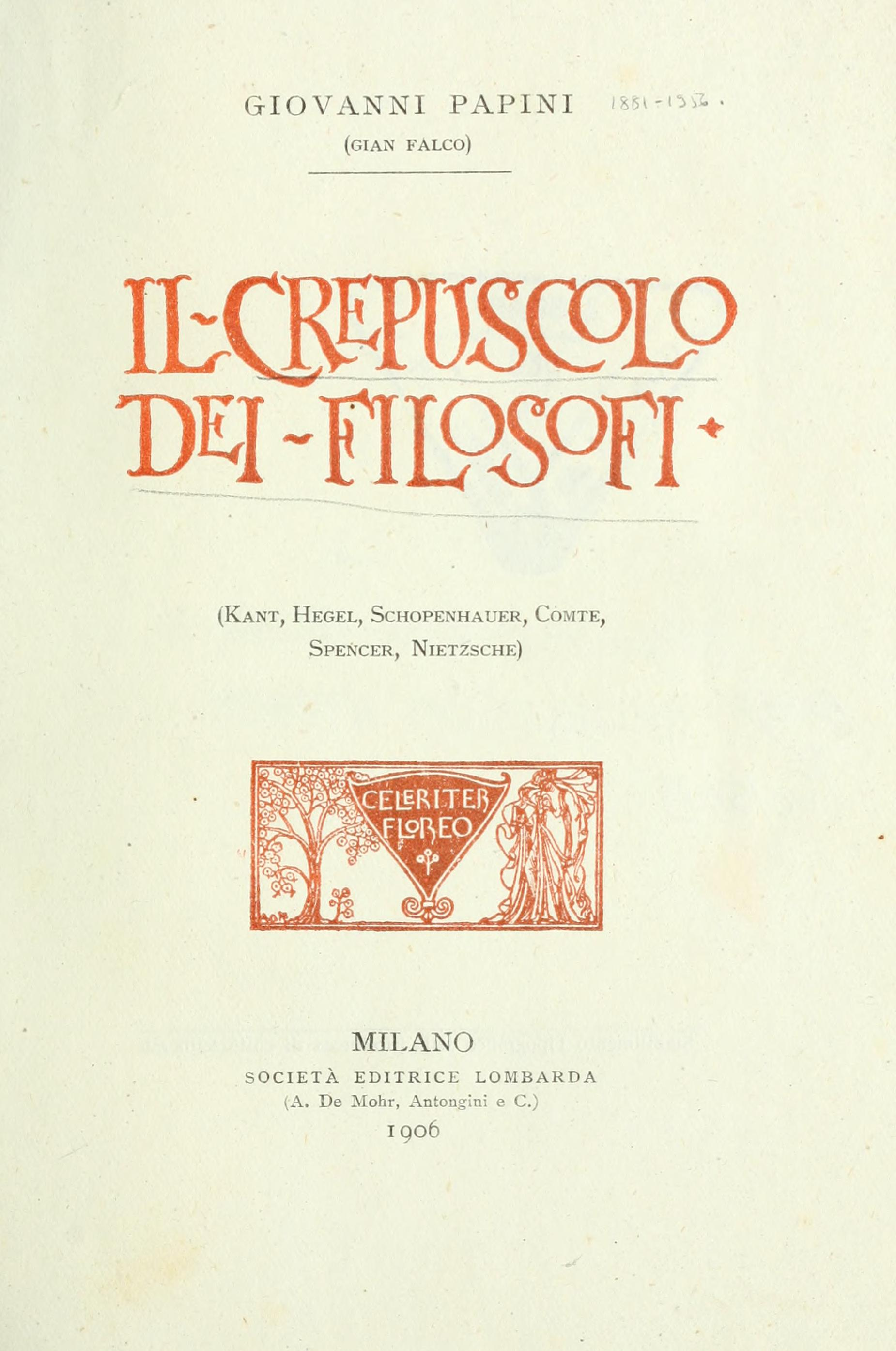
- Author: Giovanni Papini
- Language: Italian
- Publisher: Società Editrice Lombarda
- Publication date: 1906
- Publication place: Italy
- Pages: 293

Il crepuscolo dei filosofi (lit. 'The Twilight of the Philosophers') is a 1906 book by the Italian writer Giovanni Papini. It is an evaluation of modern Western philosophy, with special attention to what Papini viewed as errors in the works of Immanuel Kant, Georg Wilhelm Friedrich Hegel, Arthur Schopenhauer, Auguste Comte, Herbert Spencer and Friedrich Nietzsche. Papini here used scepticism and Nietzscheanism to reach a radical form of pragmatism and defend irrational vitalism.

Papini was not trained in philosophy but contributed to introducing the works of John Dewey and Henri Bergson to Italian readers. Il crepuscolo dei filosofi was his first major work, after he had developed his writing and positions in magazines such as Leonardo, founded in 1903 and associated with the Florentine School of pragmatism.
