= Il libro nero =

1951 novel by Giovanni Papini

- Author: Giovanni Papini
- Language: Italian
- Publisher: Vallecchi
- Publication date: 1951
- Publication place: Italy
- Pages: 395

Il libro nero. Nuovo diario di Gog (lit. 'The Black Book: Gog's New Diary') is a 1951 novel by the Italian writer Giovanni Papini. It is in the form of a diary with the views and adventures of the American millionaire Goggins, nicknamed Gog. It is the sequel to Papini's 1931 novel Gog. It was awarded the Premio Marzotto.

== Picasso quotation ==
The book contains fictitious interviews with famous people including Adolf Hitler, Guglielmo Marconi, Frank Lloyd Wright, Salvador Dalí and Pablo Picasso. A self-critical comment from the book's version of Picasso was quoted by several publications as genuine. In this comment, Picasso says: "When I am alone with myself, I have not the courage to think of myself as an artist in the great and ancient sense of the term. Giotto, Titian, Rembrandt and Goya were great painters; I am only a public entertainer who has understood his times and has exhausted as best he could the imbecility, the vanity, the cupidity of his contemporaries. Mine is a bitter confession, more painful than it may appear, but it has the merit of being sincere." Life, having published the quotation as genuine, published a correction in 1969 where it attributed it to Il libro nero and wrote that it reflects Papini's view of contemporaneous culture rather than Picasso's.
