= La Voce (magazine) =

Italian literary magazine (1908–1916)

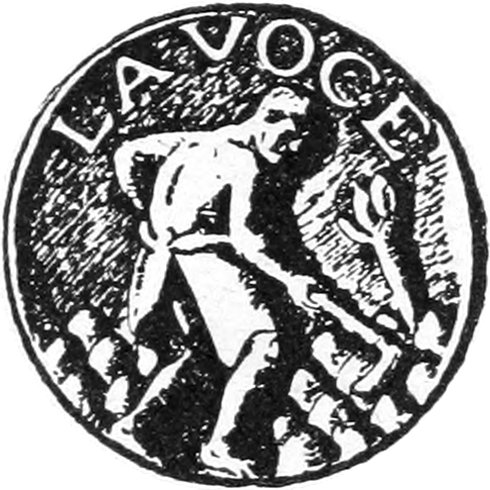
- Editor-in-chief: Giuseppe de Robertis
- Former editors: Giuseppe Prezzolini
- Categories: Literary magazine
- Frequency: Weekly
- Publisher: Firenze
- Founder: Giuseppe Prezzolini
- Founded: 1908
- First issue: 20 December 1908
- Final issue: December 1916
- Country: Italy
- Based in: Florence
- Language: Italian
- ISSN: 1722-7798
- OCLC: 470423977

La Voce (Italian: the Voice) was an Italian weekly literary magazine which was published in Florence, Italy, between 1908 and 1916. The magazine is also one of the publications which contributed to the cultural basis of the early forms of Fascism. It also contributed to the development of the concept of Europeanism.

== History and profile ==
La Voce was established as a weekly cultural review by Giuseppe Prezzolini, an anti-conformist Italian author, in 1908. Prezzolini was also co-founder of another magazine, Leonardo. La Voce was based in Florence, and Giovanni Papini was functional in its establishment. The first issue of La Voce appeared on 20 December 1908.

Prezzolini stopped his writings in the magazine in 1912 due to disagreements with other significant contributors, including Papini, over Italy's intervention in the Libyan war. He resigned from the magazine as editor-in-chief, a post which he held between 1908 and 1913. Papini also left the magazine in 1913. Prezzolini was succeeded by Giuseppe de Robertis as editor-in-chief who held the post from December 1914 to December 1916.

Soon after its inception La Voce appeared as the most influential forum for dissenters in Italy to discuss "social problems created by the new forms of human coexistence in the new industrial world." The early contributors of the magazine considered poetry as a social commitment and moral responsibility. The ultimate goal of the magazine was to produce involved readers having social awareness and to improve spiritual unity of all Italians. To this end La Voce employed a language and approach that would welcome all classes. Sigmund Freud's theories on sexuality were first introduced to Italians by the magazine via an article by Roberto Assagioli published in 1910.

Until 1914 La Voce exclusively focused on philosophical, ethical and political affairs in addition to literary content. During the period between 14 December 1914 and 31 December 1916 the magazine was published with the title La Voce Bianca. The content of the magazine also changed, and it became a pure literary review using the motto, "know how to read". The writers of the magazine at that time commonly produced poetic or prose fragments. It became closely allied with futurists which it had rejected between its start and 1913 while Papini was one of the contributors. Ardengo Soffici's book Primi principi di una estetica futurista (Italian: First principles of a futurist aesthetic) was serialized in the magazine between February and December 1916 before its publication by the publishing house Vallecchi in 1920.

La Voce ceased publication in December 1916 after eighteen issues.

=== Contributors ===
Italian writers and poets Vincenzo Cardarelli, Ardengo Soffici, Clemente Rebora, Giovanni Amendola and Alessandro Casati were among the regular contributors to the magazine. Of them Ardengo Soffici published articles on the Paris art scene focusing on Gustave Courbet, Henri Rousseau, Pierre-Auguste Renoir and Pablo Picasso. The topics of his articles also included Impressionism, work by Arthur Rimbaud and French avant-garde poetry.

Another significant contributor was Benito Mussolini, who published articles before World War I when he was a socialist. French thinker Georges Sorel also collaborated with Le Voce. Roberto Longhi was a regular contributor between 1912 and 1916 who published very radical essays.

== Legacy ==
Le Voce became a model for the German expressionist magazine Der Sturm which was started in 1910. Solaria, an Italian magazine established in 1926, was also influenced from La Voce.

== See also ==
- List of magazines in Italy
