= The Story of Christ =

1921 book by Giovanni Papini

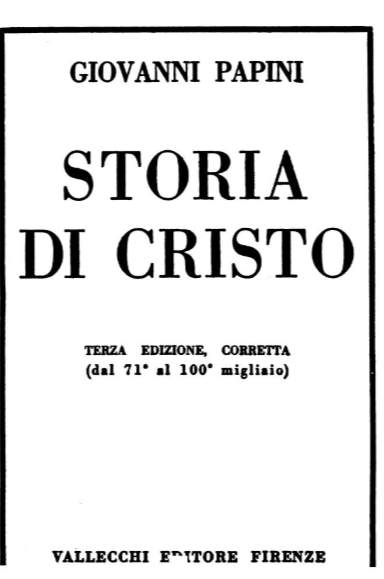
- Author: Giovanni Papini
- Original title: Storia di Cristo
- Translator: Dorothy Canfield Fisher
- Language: Italian
- Publisher: Vallechi
- Publication date: 1921
- Publication place: Italy
- English publication date: 1923
- Pages: 638

The Story of Christ (Italian: Storia di Cristo), published as Life of Christ in the United States, is a 1921 book by the Italian writer Giovanni Papini. It is Papini's retelling of the stories of the Biblical Gospels.

Papini had a past as a prominent critic of Christianity, but had changed his mind and adhered to a type of Catholicism that had seen a revival in Italy during World War I. In The Story of Christ, he treated the depiction of Jesus in the Bible as completely true and all four Gospels as of equal value. He wrote that his book was especially intended "for those who are outside the Church of Christ; the others, those who have remained within, united to the heirs of the apostles, do not need my words".

The Story of Christ was widely discussed in Italy upon publication. The first edition of 20,000 copies sold out in a little more than a week. Five more Italian editions had been published by 1923, when Dorothy Canfield Fisher's English translation was published. The book made Papini widely known also outside of Italy.
