= Giuseppe Antonio Borgese =

Italian-American writer, journalist, critic, Germanist, poet, playwright and academic

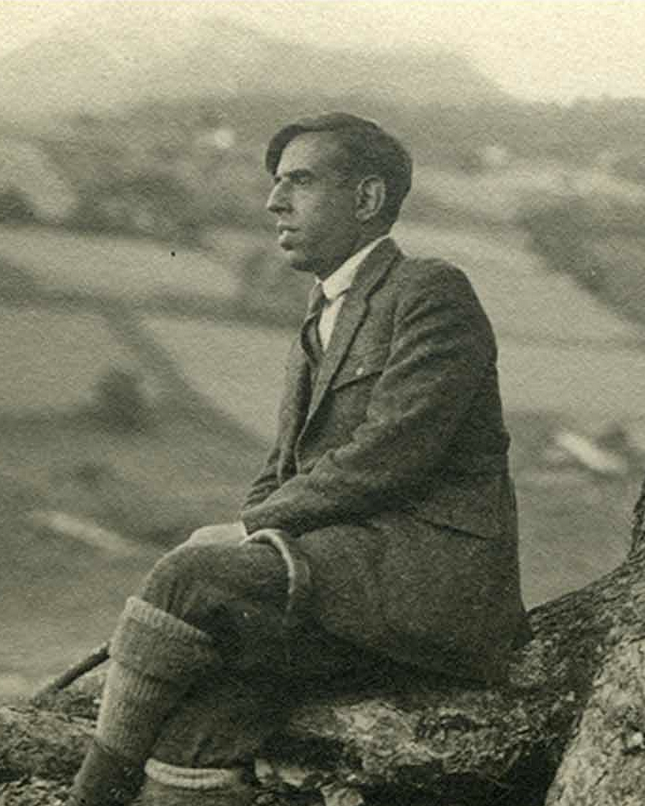
G. A. Borgese a San Vigilio di Marebbe (cropped)

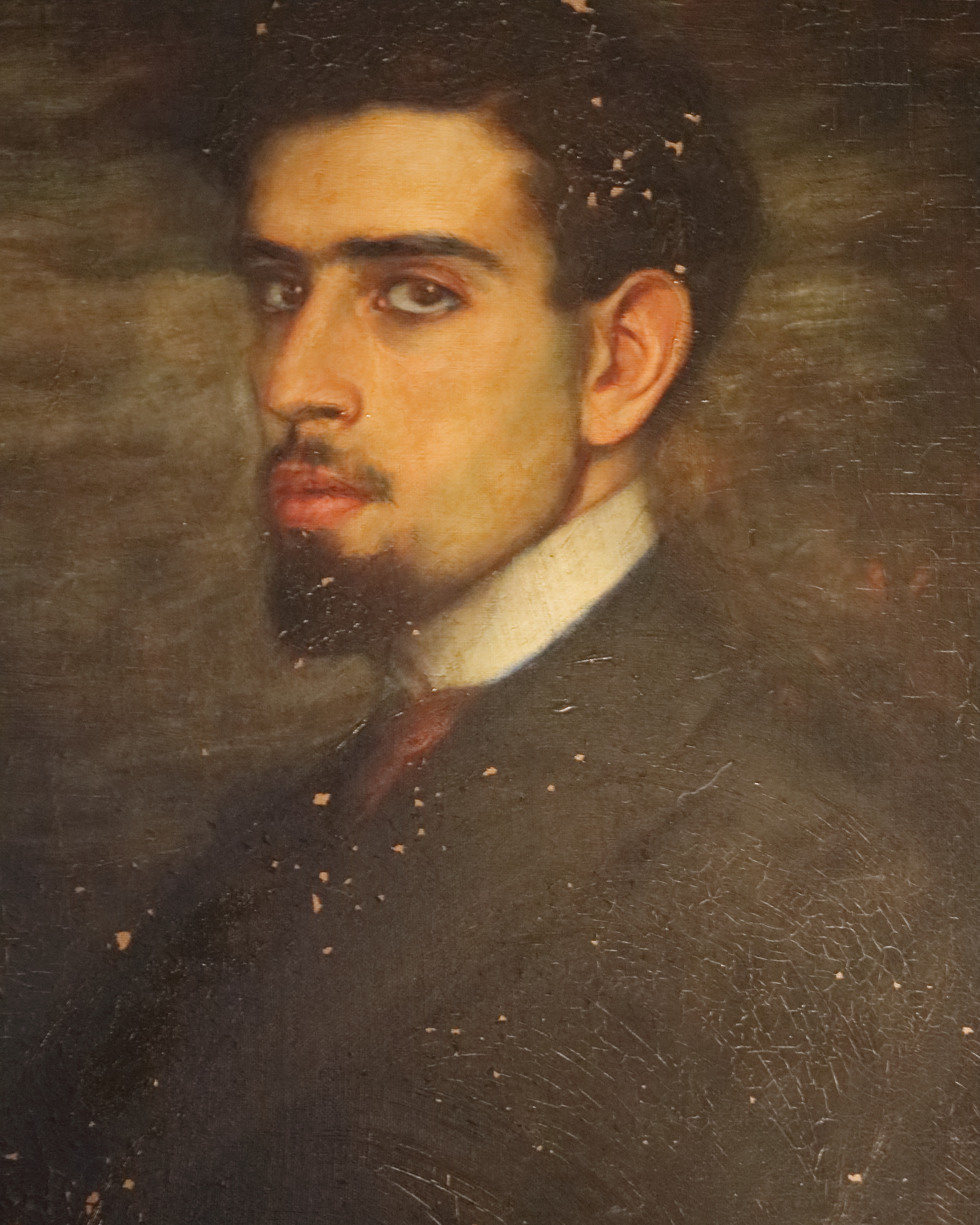
Giuseppe Antonio Borgese portraited by Giovanni Costetti (1904)

Giuseppe Antonio Borgese (12 November 1882 – 4 December 1952) was an Italian writer, journalist, literary critic, Germanist, poet, playwright, and academic naturalized American.

== Biography ==
Borgese was born in Polizzi Generosa, Sicily on November 12, 1882 and was raised by relatives in nearby Palermo.

During the academic year 1899–1900, under pressure from his father who wanted him to be a lawyer, he enrolled in the Faculty of Law of the University of Palermo.

In 1900, he moved to Florence where, at the Institute of Higher Studies, he followed the courses of Girolamo Vitelli, Pio Rajna, Pasquale Villari, Achille Coen, and Guido Mazzoni. He received his doctorate in literature from the University of Florence in 1903.

During this period Borgese made several literary contributions, including the naming of the early 20th century Italian poetic movement, crepuscolarismo (the twilight school), characterized by themes of disillusionment, nostalgia, and simplicity of form.

From his marriage with the writer Maria Freschi he had two children: Leonardo (1904) and Giovanna (1911).

In his early years he founded several literary reviews, including the Dannunzian Hermes (1904), and worked for newspapers such as Corriere della Sera, La Stampa, and Il Mattino. He also contributed to the Leonardo magazine.

He taught German literature and aesthetics at the universities of Turin, Rome, and Milan until 1931 when, due to his opposition of the Fascist regime, he was forced to move to the United States. There he declared himself a political exile and became an U.S. citizen in 1938. When the Italian-American antifascist Mazzini Society was founded in 1939, Borgese joined it. He was the William Allan Neilson Professor at Smith College from 1932 to 1935 and was a professor at the Universities of Chicago and California until the end of World War II, where he befriended Thomas Mann. In 1939 Borgese married Mann’s youngest daughter, Elisabeth, with whom he had two daughters, Angelica and Dominica.

After the war, Giuseppe and Elisabeth worked with the Chicago Committee to Frame a World Constitution, a university group involved in the drafting of and commentary on non-government world constitutions. In 1948 the committee published the Preliminary Draft of a World Constitution, which included the groundbreaking and controversial declaration that “The four elements of life - earth, water, air, energy - are common property of the human race”.

In 1952, with McCarthyism on the rise in the US, the couple moved from to Italy where Borgese was later reinstated as faculty at the University of Milan.

Borgese died in Fiesole on a December 4, 1952 at the age of 70.

== Works ==
Poetry

- La canzone paziente (1910)
- Le Poesie (1922)
- Poesie 1922-1952 (1952)

Novels

- Rubè (1921)
- I vivi e i morti (1923)

Short stories

- La città sconosciuta (1925)
- La tragedia di Mayerling (1925)
- Le belle (1927)
- Il sole non è tramontato (1929)
- Tempesta nel nulla (1931)
- Il pellegrino appassionato (1933)
- La Siracusana (1950)
- Le novelle (2 volumes, 1950)

Theatre

- L'Arciduca (1924)
- Lazzaro (1925)

Literature and aesthetics

- Gabriele D'Annunzio (1909)
- Mefistofele. Con un discorso sulla personalità di Goethe (1911)
- La vita e il libro (3 volumes, 1910–1913)
- Studi di letterature moderne (1915)
- Resurrezione (1922)
- Tempo di edificare (1923)
- Ottocento europeo (1927)
- Il senso della letteratura italiana (1931)
- Poetica dell'unità. Cinque saggi (1934)
- Problemi di estetica e storia della critica (1952)

Journalism and essays

- La nuova Germania (1909)
- Italia e Germania (1915)
- Guerra di redenzione (1915)
- La guerra delle idee (1916)
- L'Italia e la nuova alleanza (1937)
- L'Alto Adige contro l'Italia (1921)
- Goliath, the March of Fascism (1937)
- Disegno preliminare di costituzione mondiale (1949)

Voyages

- Autunno a Costantinopoli (1929)
- Giro lungo per la primavera (1930)
- Escursioni in terre nuove (1931)
- Atlante americano (1936)
