= Norbert von Hellingrath =

German literary scholar (1888–1916)

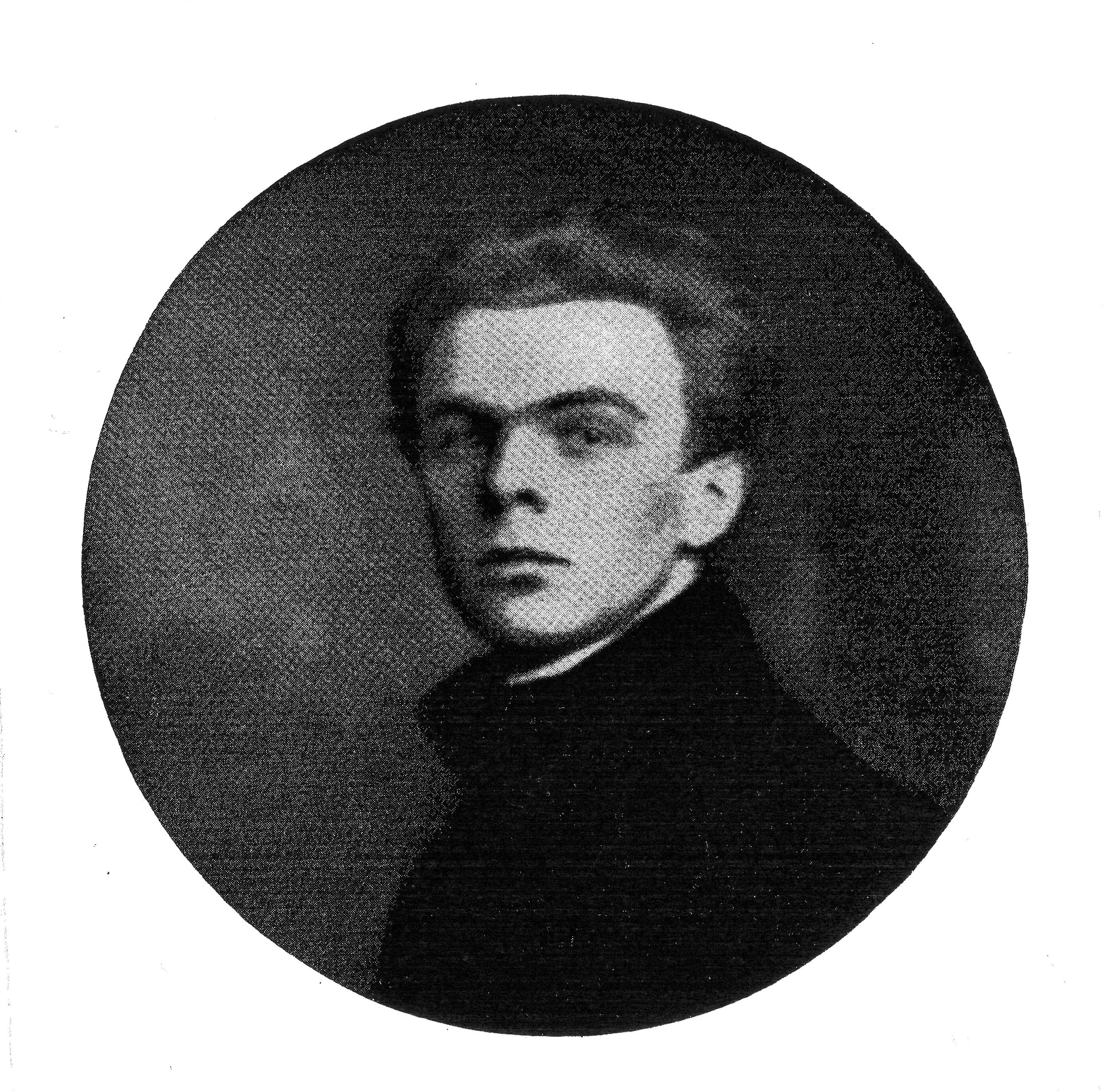
- Born: Friedrich Norbert Theodor von Hellingrath; 21 March 1888; Munich, German Empire
- Died: 14 December 1916 (aged 28); Verdun, French Third Republic
- Cause of death: Killed in action
- Known for: Reviving the works of the poet Friedrich Hölderlin

Friedrich Norbert Theodor von Hellingrath (21 March 1888, Munich – 14 December 1916, Verdun) was a German literary scholar whose main contribution to literary scholarship is the first complete edition of the works of the poet Friedrich Hölderlin.

== Biography ==
Hellingrath was born in Munich: his father was an army officer and his mother claimed descent from the Byzantine Emperor John VI Cantacuzenus. He studied philosophy at the Ludwig-Maximilians-Universität München.

Attracted to Hölderlin's poetry from an early age, in 1910 he provided a prefatory essay for the first publication of Hölderlin's translations of Pindar (published in Jena, 1911).

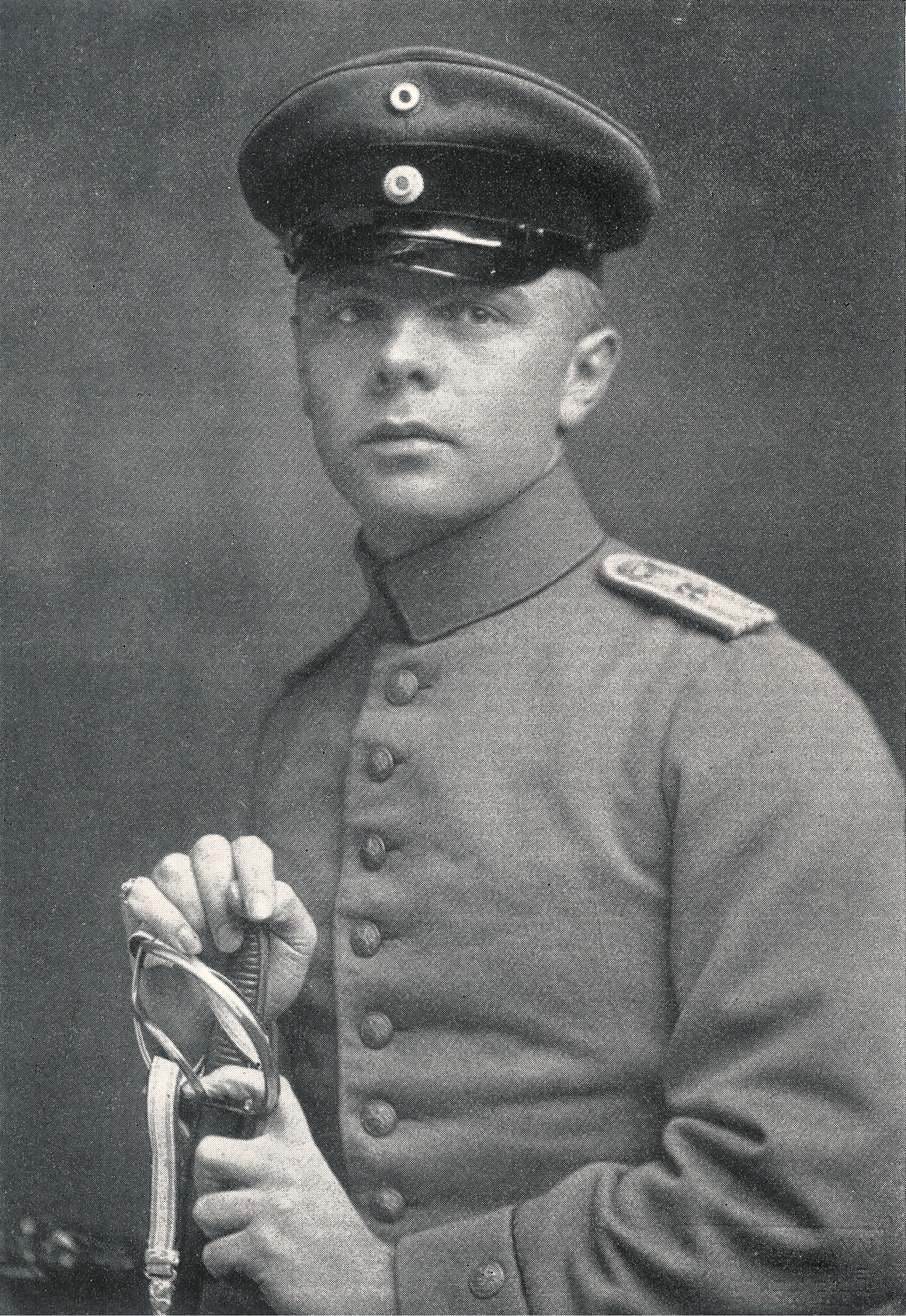
Norbert von Hellingrath during World War I.

From 1912 to 1914 Hellingrath lived and taught in Paris, during which time he began work on his monumental first-ever "Complete Edition" of Hölderlin, Hölderlins Samtliche Werke, collecting together not only all the poems in their variant forms, the novel Hyperion, the unfinished drama The Death of Empedocles, the articles and translations, but also all traceable letters and written accounts of the poet. The enterprise was planned in six volumes. Hellingrath published Volumes I and V in Munich in 1913, but after the outbreak of World War I, he volunteered for military service and was killed in action during the Battle of Verdun on 14 December 1916 at the age of 28.

== Legacy ==
Volume IV appeared posthumously in Munich in 1916, and the edition was completed after the Armistice by Friedrich Seebass and Ludwig von Pigenot; the remaining volumes appeared in Berlin between 1922 and 1923. Though since superseded by two subsequent complete editions (the Stuttgarter and Frankfurter Ausgabe), Hellingrath's pioneering work continues to have value.

The Berlin Edition led to Hölderlin posthumously receiving the recognition that had always eluded him in life. Due to Norbert von Hellingrath's scholarship and advocacy, Hölderlin has been regarded since 1913 as one of the greatest poets ever to write in the German language.

Stefan George, who Hellingrath was friends with, commemorated him in a poem, "Norbert", published in 1928.
