= Leonardo (Italian magazine) =

Philosophy and literary magazine in Italy (1903–1907)

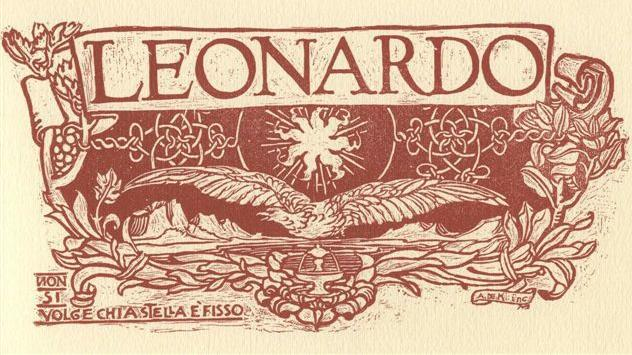
- Editor: Giovanni Papini
- Categories: Philosophy magazine; Literary magazine
- Frequency: Irregular
- Founder: Giovanni Papini
- Founded: 1903
- First issue: January 1903
- Final issue: 1907
- Country: Italy
- Based in: Florence
- Language: Italian

Leonardo was a philosophy magazine published in the early twentieth century in Florence, Italy, between 1903 and 1907. It was one of the publications started by Giovanni Papini and contributed by Giuseppe Prezzolini. The magazine is also one of the periodicals which contributed to the cultural basis of the early forms of Fascism.

== History and profile ==
Leonardo was started in Florence in January 1903. One of its founders was Giovanni Papini who also edited the magazine. It came out irregularly. Significant contributors included Giuseppe Prezzolini, Mario Calderoni, Giuseppe Antonio Borgese, Emilio Cecchi and Giovanni Amendola who also financed the magazine which featured articles on philosophical reviews and also, on literature and arts. They were called the leonardiani.

The front page of the first issue contained a synthetic program which indicated the stance of the contributors, namely personalism and idealism. They regarded themselves as being superior to any system and to every limit. In addition, the magazine frequently covered articles attacking positivism, particularly during the early years. Official philosophical stance of the magazine appeared to be pragmatism at the end of the first year of existence.

Leonardo was closed by Giovanni Papini and Giuseppe Prezzolini in 1907 due to the fact that it was becoming a commercial and mainstream publication because of its popularity and success.
