= Giuseppe Prezzolini =

Italian journalist and writer (1882–1982)

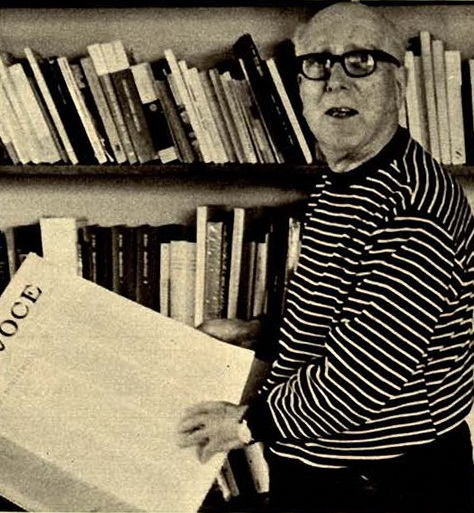
- Prezzolini in 1975
- Born: 27 January 1882; Perugia, Italy
- Died: 14 July 1982 (aged 100); Lugano, Switzerland
- Occupations: Essayist; journalist; literary critic
- Spouses: Dolores Faconti (m. 1905; died 1962); Gioconda Savini (m. 1962)
- Children: 2
- Writing career
- Pen name: Giuliano il Sofista
- Period: 1903–1982
- Notable awards: Order of Merit of the Italian Republic (1971)
- Movements: Futurism; Modernism

Signature
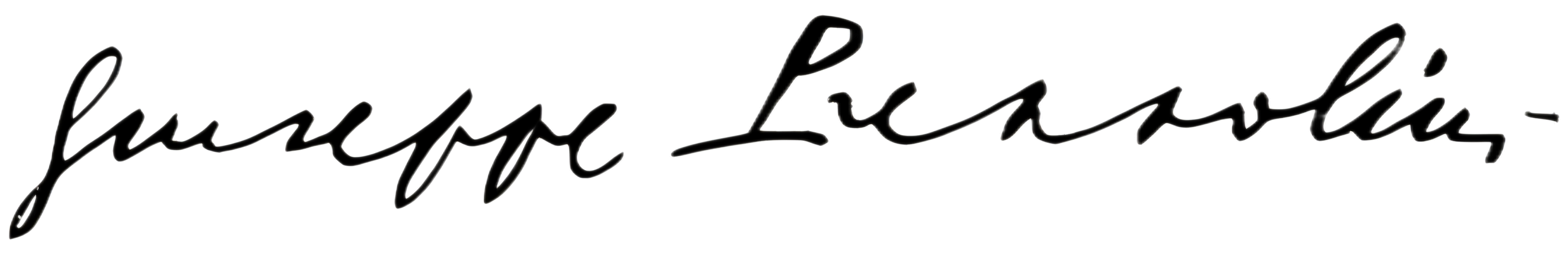

Giuseppe Prezzolini (27 January 1882 – 14 July 1982) was an Italian literary critic, journalist, editor and writer. He later became an American citizen.

== Biography ==
Prezzolini was born in Perugia in January 1882, to Tuscan parents from Siena, Luigi and Emilia Pianigiani. In 1903 he founded together with Giovanni Papini the literary journal Leonardo. In 1908 he founded La Voce, a cultural and literary journal that grew to become very influential.

In 1929, Prezzolini moved to the United States, where he taught at Columbia University in New York City, and served as Head of that University's Casa Italiana. He was the author of many books in both Italian and English, including primary essays of philosophy, history and literary criticism. He died in Lugano on 14 July 1982.

== Works ==
- La coltura italiana (with Giovanni Papini). Florence, Soc. An. Editrice "La Voce", 1906
- L'arte di persuadere, 1907
- Cos'è il modernismo?, 1908
- La teoria sindacalista, 1909
- Benedetto Croce, Naples, Ricciardi, 1909
- Vecchio e nuovo nazionalismo, (with G. Papini), 1914
- Dopo Caporetto. Rome, La Voce, 1919.
- Vittorio Veneto. Rome, La Voce, 1920.
- Codice della vita italiana, 1921.
- Benito Mussolini. Rome, Formiggini, 1924.
- Mi pare.... Fiume, Edizioni Delta, 1925.
- Giovanni Amendola. Rome, Formiggini, 1925.
- Vita di Nicolò Machiavelli fiorentino, 1927.

Published in the United States

- Come gli Americani scoprirono l'Italia. 1750-1850, 1933;
- L'italiano inutile, 1954;
- Saper leggere, 1956;
- Tutta l'America, 1958;
- The Legacy of Italy, 1948 (published in Italy as L'Italia finisce, ecco quel che resta, Vallecchi, 1958)

After Prezzolini's return to Italy

- Ideario, 1967;
- Dio è un rischio, 1969;

After Prezzolini's move to Lugano, Switzerland

- Manifesto dei conservatori. Milan, Rusconi, 1972;
- Amendola e «La Voce». Florence, Sansoni, 1973;
- La Voce, 1908-1913. Cronaca, antologia e fortuna di una rivista. Milan, Rusconi, 1974;
- Storia tascabile della letteratura italiana. Milan, Pan, 1976;
- Sul fascismo. 1915-1975. Milan, Pan, 1977;
- Prezzolini alla finestra. Milan, Pan, 1977.

Memoirs and correspondence

- Storia di un'amicizia (correspondence with Giovanni Papini), 2 voll., 1966–68
- Giovanni Boine, Carteggio, vol. I, Giovanni Boine – Giuseppe Prezzolini (1908-1915) pp. xviii-262, 1971
- Giuseppe De Luca, Giuseppe Prezzolini, Carteggio (1925-1962), 1975
- Carteggio Giuseppe Prezzolini, Ardengo Soffici. 1: 1907-1918. A cura di Mario Richter. Rome, Edizioni di Storia e Letteratura, 1977. (Scheda libro)
- Carteggio Giuseppe Prezzolini, Ardengo Soffici. 2: 1920-1964. Edited by Mario Richter and Maria Emanuela Raffi. Rome, Edizioni di Storia e Letteratura, 1982
- Carteggio 1904-1945, con Benedetto Croce, 1990
- Giuseppe Prezzolini - Mario Missiroli, Carteggio (1906-1974), edited by and with an introduction by Alfonso Botti, Rome-Lugano, Edizioni di Storia e Letteratura, Dipartimento dell'Istruzione e cultura del Cantone Ticino, 1992, pp. XL-472
- Antonio Baldini, Giuseppe Prezzolini, Carteggio 1912-1962, pp. xxii-150, 1993
- Piero Marrucchi, Giuseppe Prezzolini, Carteggio 1902-1918, pp. xxvi-250, 1997
- Giovanni Angelo Abbo, Giuseppe Prezzolini, Carteggio 1956-1982, pp. xii-236, 2000
- Diario, 1900-1941. Milan, Rusconi, 1978
- Diario, 1942-1968. Milan, Rusconi, 1980

Posthumous publications

- Vita di Niccolò Machiavelli fiorentino. Milan, Rusconi, 1994. ISBN 8818700871.
- Intervista sulla Destra. Milan, Mondadori, 1994. ISBN 8804387246.
- Diario, 1968-1982. Milan, Rusconi, 1999.
- Codice della vita italiana, Robin, 2003. ISBN 8873710220.
- Addio a Papini (with Ardengo Soffici), edited by M. Attucci and L. Corsetti, Poggio a Caiano - Prato, Associazione Culturale Ardengo Soffici - Pentalinea, 2006. ISBN 88-86855-41-9.
