= Giovanni Papini =

Italian writer (1881–1956)

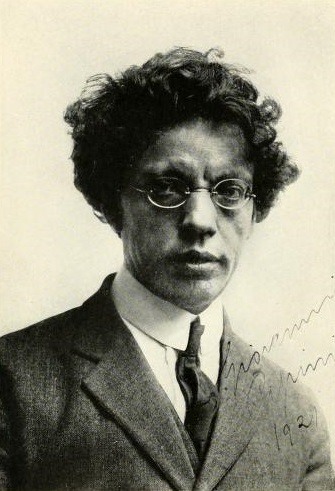
- Papini in 1921
- Born: 9 January 1881; Florence, Kingdom of Italy
- Died: 8 July 1956 (aged 75); Florence, Italy
- Resting place: Cimitero delle Porte Sante
- Occupations: Essayist; journalist; literary critic; poet; novelist
- Spouse: Giacinta Giovagnoli (1887–1958)
- Children: 2
- Writing career
- Pen name: Gian Falco
- Period: 1903–1956
- Genres: Prose poetry, autobiography, travel literature, satire
- Subjects: Political philosophy, history of religion
- Notable works: A Man — Finished, Gog, The Story of Christ
- Notable awards: Valdagno Prize (1951), Golden Quill Prize (1957)
- Movements: Futurism; Modernism

Signature
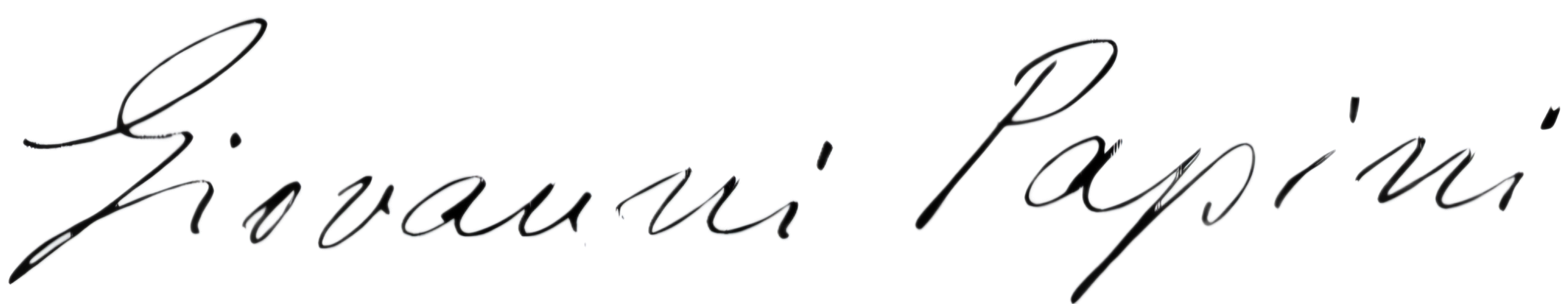

Giovanni Papini (9 January 1881 – 8 July 1956) was an Italian journalist, essayist, novelist, short story writer, poet, literary critic, and philosopher. A controversial literary figure of the early and mid-twentieth century, he was the earliest and most enthusiastic representative and promoter of Italian pragmatism. Papini was admired for his writing style and engaged in heated polemics. Involved with avant-garde movements such as futurism and post-decadentism, he moved from one political and philosophical position to another, always dissatisfied and uneasy: he converted from anti-clericalism and atheism to Catholicism, and went from convinced interventionism – before 1915 – to an aversion to war. In the 1930s, after moving from individualism to conservatism, he finally became a fascist, while maintaining an aversion to Nazism.

As one of the founders of the journals Leonardo (1903) and Lacerba (1913), he conceived literature as "action" and gave his writings an oratory and irreverent tone. Though self-educated, he was an influential iconoclastic editor and writer, with a leading role in Italian futurism and the early literary movements of youth. Working in Florence, he actively participated in foreign literary philosophical and political movements such as the French intuitionism of Bergson and the Anglo-American pragmatism of Peirce and James. Promoting the development of Italian culture and life with an individualistic and dreamy conception of life and art, he acted as a spokesman for Roman Catholic religious beliefs.

Papini's literary success began with Il crepuscolo dei filosofi ("The Twilight of the Philosophers"), published in 1906, and his 1913 publication of his autobiographical novel Un uomo finito ("A finished man").

Due to his ideological choices, Papini's work was almost forgotten after his death, although it was later re-evaluated and appreciated again: in 1975, the Argentine writer Jorge Luis Borges called him an "undeservedly forgotten" author.

== Early life ==
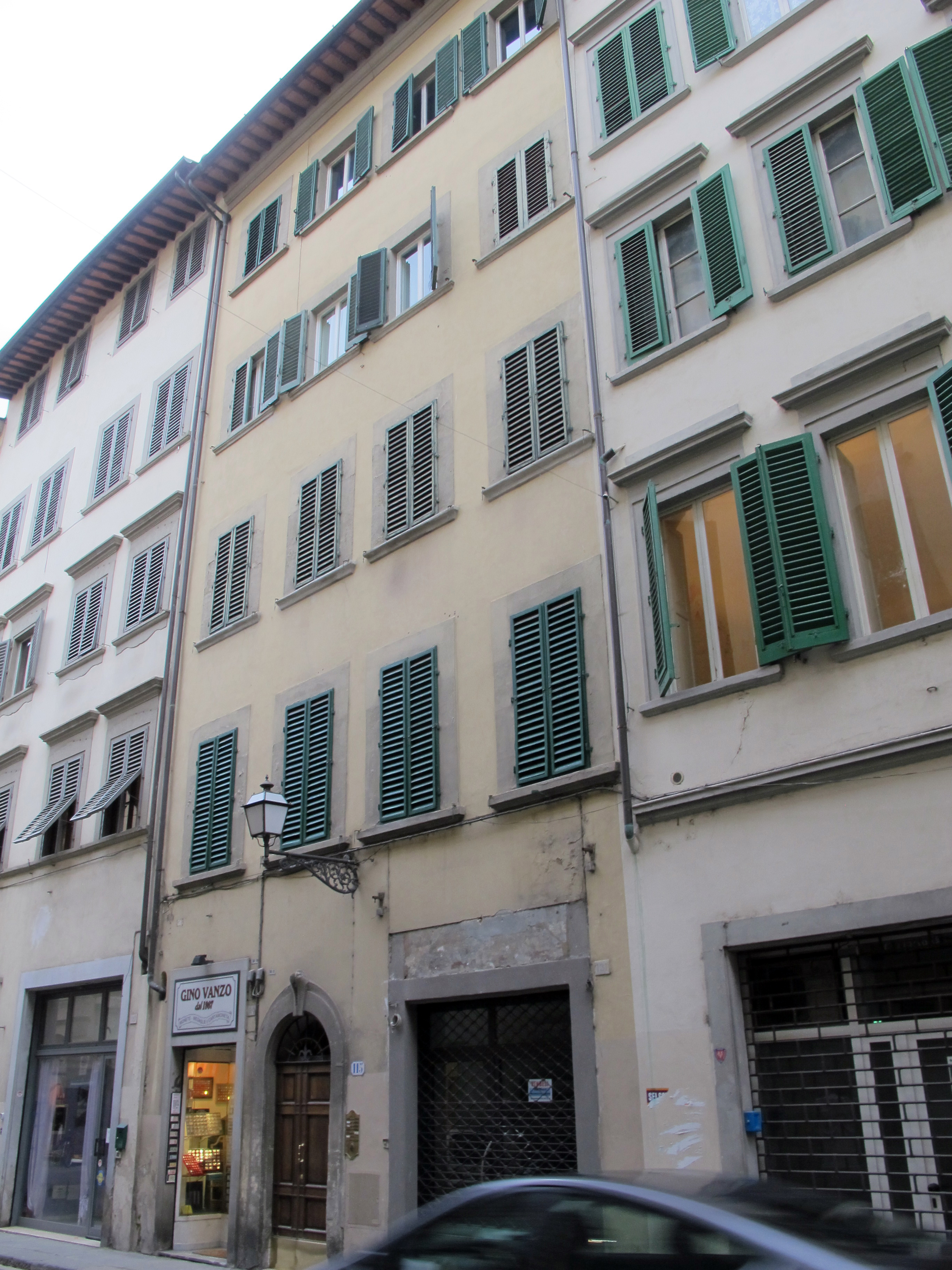
Giovanni Papini's house in Florence

Born in Florence as the son of a modest furniture retailer (and former member of Giuseppe Garibaldi's Redshirts) from Borgo degli Albizi, Papini was baptized in secret by his mother to avoid the aggressive anti-clericalism of his father. Almost entirely self-educated, he never received an official university degree, and his highest level of education was a teaching certificate. Papini had a rustic, lonesome childhood. He felt a strong aversion to all beliefs, to all churches, as well as to any form of servitude (which he saw as connected to religion); he became enchanted with the idea of writing an encyclopedia wherein all cultures would be summarized.

Trained at the Istituto di Studi Superiori (1900–2), he taught for a year in the Anglo-Italian school and then was a librarian at the Museum of Anthropology from 1902 to 1904. The literary life attracted Papini, who in 1903 founded the magazine Il Leonardo, to which he contributed articles under the pseudonym of "Gian Falco." His collaborators included Giuseppe Prezzolini, Borgese, Vailati, Costetti and Calderoni. Through Leonardo's Papini and his contributors introduced in Italy important thinkers such as Kierkegaard, Peirce, Nietzsche, Santayana and Poincaré. He would later join the staff of Il Regno, a nationalist publication directed by Enrico Corradini, who formed the Associazione Nazionalistica Italiana, to support his country colonial expansionism.

Papini met William James and Henri Bergson, who greatly influenced his early works. He started publishing short stories and essays: in 1906, "Il Tragico Quotidiano" ("Everyday Tragic"), in 1907 "Il Pilota Cieco" ("The Blind Pilot") and Il crepuscolo dei filosofi ("The Twilight of the Philosophers"). The latter constituted a polemic with established and diverse intellectual figures, such as Immanuel Kant, Georg Wilhelm Friedrich Hegel, Auguste Comte, Herbert Spencer, Arthur Schopenhauer, and Friedrich Nietzsche.

Papini proclaimed the death of philosophy and the demolition of thinking itself. He briefly flirted with Futurism and other violent and liberating forms of Modernism

In 1907 Papini married Giacinta Giovagnoli; the couple had two daughters.

== Before and during World War I ==
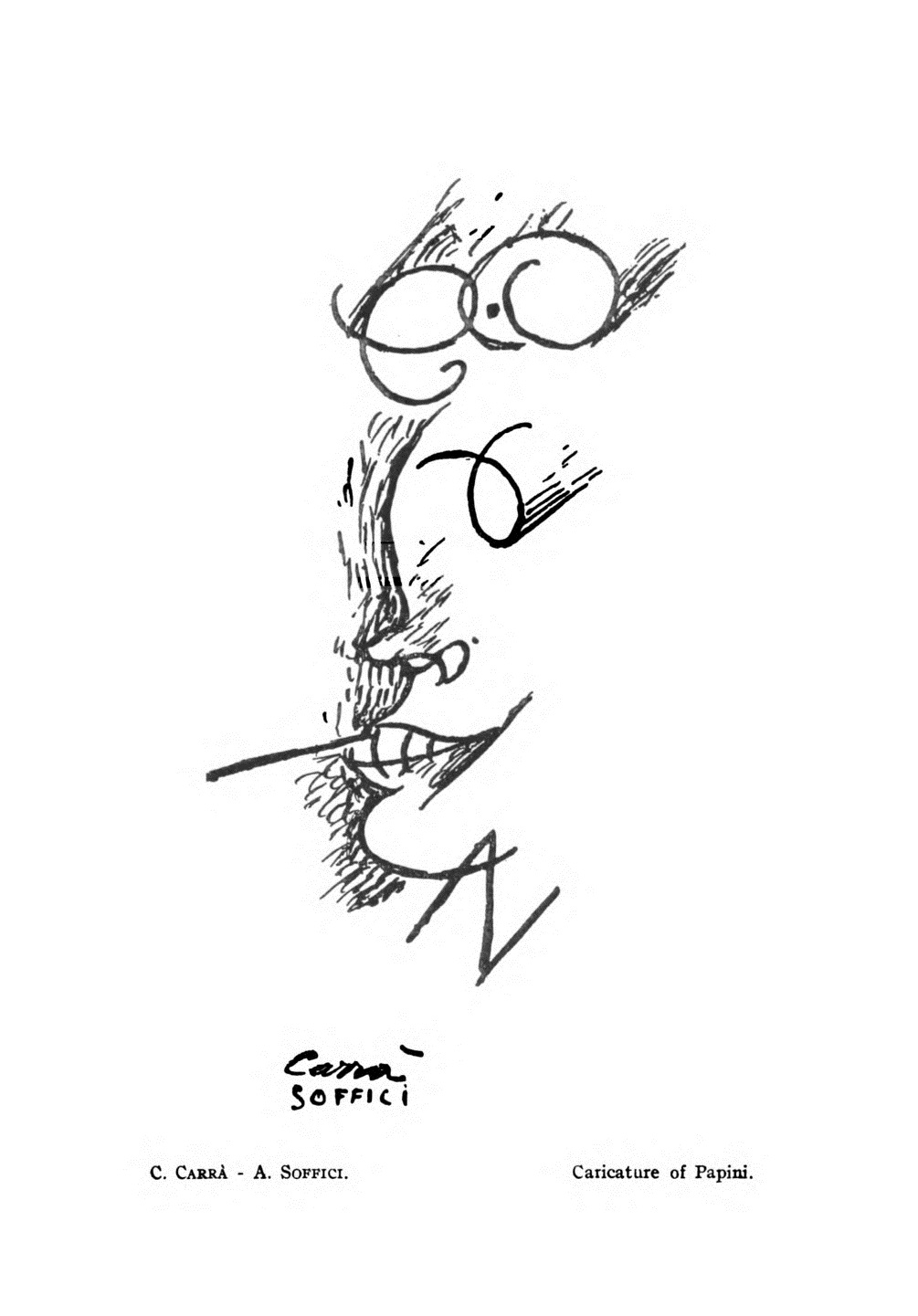
"Caricature of Papini", by Carlo Carrà & Ardengo Soffici, from Broom, 1922.

After leaving Il Leonardo in 1907, Giovanni Papini founded several other magazines. First, he published La Voce in 1908, then L'Anima together with Giovanni Amendola and Prezzolini. In 1913 (right before Italy's entry into World War I) he started Lacerba (1913–15). For three years Papini was a correspondent for the Mercure de France and later literary critic for La Nazione. About 1918 he created yet another review, La Vraie Italie, with Ardengo Soffici.

Other books came from his pen. His Parole e Sangue ("Words and Blood") showed his fundamental atheism. Furthermore, Papini sought to create a scandal by speculating that Jesus and John the Apostle had a homosexual relationship. In 1912 he published his best-known work, the autobiographical novel Un Uomo Finito (A Man — Finished in the United Kingdom and The Failure in the United States).

In his 1915 collection of poetic prose Cento Pagine di Poesia (followed by Buffonate, Maschilità, and Stroncature), Papini placed himself face-to-face with Giovanni Boccaccio, William Shakespeare, Johann Wolfgang von Goethe, but also contemporaries such as Benedetto Croce and Giovanni Gentile, and less prominent disciples of Gabriele D'Annunzio. A critic wrote of him:

Giovanni Papini [...] is one of the finest minds in the Italy of today. He is an excellent representative of modernity's restless search for truth, and his work exhibits a refreshing independence founded, not like so much so-called independence, upon ignorance of the past, but upon a study and understanding of it.

He published verse in 1917, grouped under the title Opera Prima. At first Papini strongly favoured Italian intervention into World War I. The war, however, shocked him into a sense of guilt which contributed to his conversion to Catholicism, announced in 1919. His Storia di Cristo ("The Story of Christ"), published in 1921, was translated into twenty-three languages and became an international bestseller.

After further verse works, he published the satire Gog (1931) and the essay Dante Vivo ("Living Dante", or "If Dante Were Alive"; 1933).

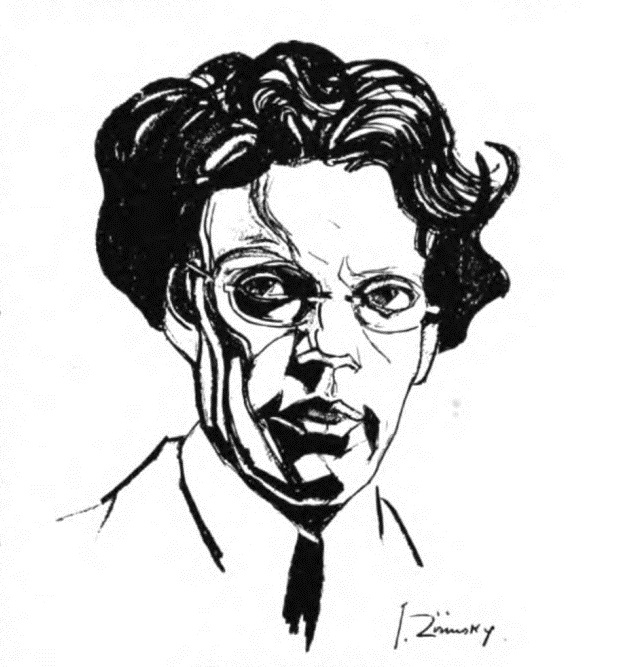
Drawing of Papini, by Julius Zirinsky.

== World War II and collaborations with Fascism ==
He became a teacher at the University of Bologna in 1935 when the Fascist authorities confirmed Papini's "impeccable reputation" through the appointment. In 1937, Papini published the only volume of his History of Italian Literature, which he dedicated to Benito Mussolini: "to Il Duce, friend of poetry and of the poets", being awarded top positions in academia, especially in the study of Italian Renaissance. In 1940 Papini's Storia della Letteratura Italiana was published in Nazi Germany with the title Eternal Italy: The Great in its Empire of Letters (in German: Ewiges Italien – Die Großen im Reich seiner Dichtung).

Papini was the vice president of the Europäische Schriftstellervereinigung (i.e. European Writers' League), which was founded by Joseph Goebbels in 1941/42. When the Fascist regime crumbled in 1943, Papini entered a Franciscan convent in La Verna, under the name "Fra' Bonaventura".

== Final years ==
Largely discredited at the end of World War II in Europe, Papini was defended by the Catholic political right. His work concentrated on different subjects, including a biography of Michelangelo, while he continued to publish dark and tragic essays. He collaborated with Corriere della Sera, contributing articles that were published as a volume after his death.

Papini had been suffering from progressive paralysis (due by motor neuron disease) and was blind during the last years of his life. He died at the age of 75.

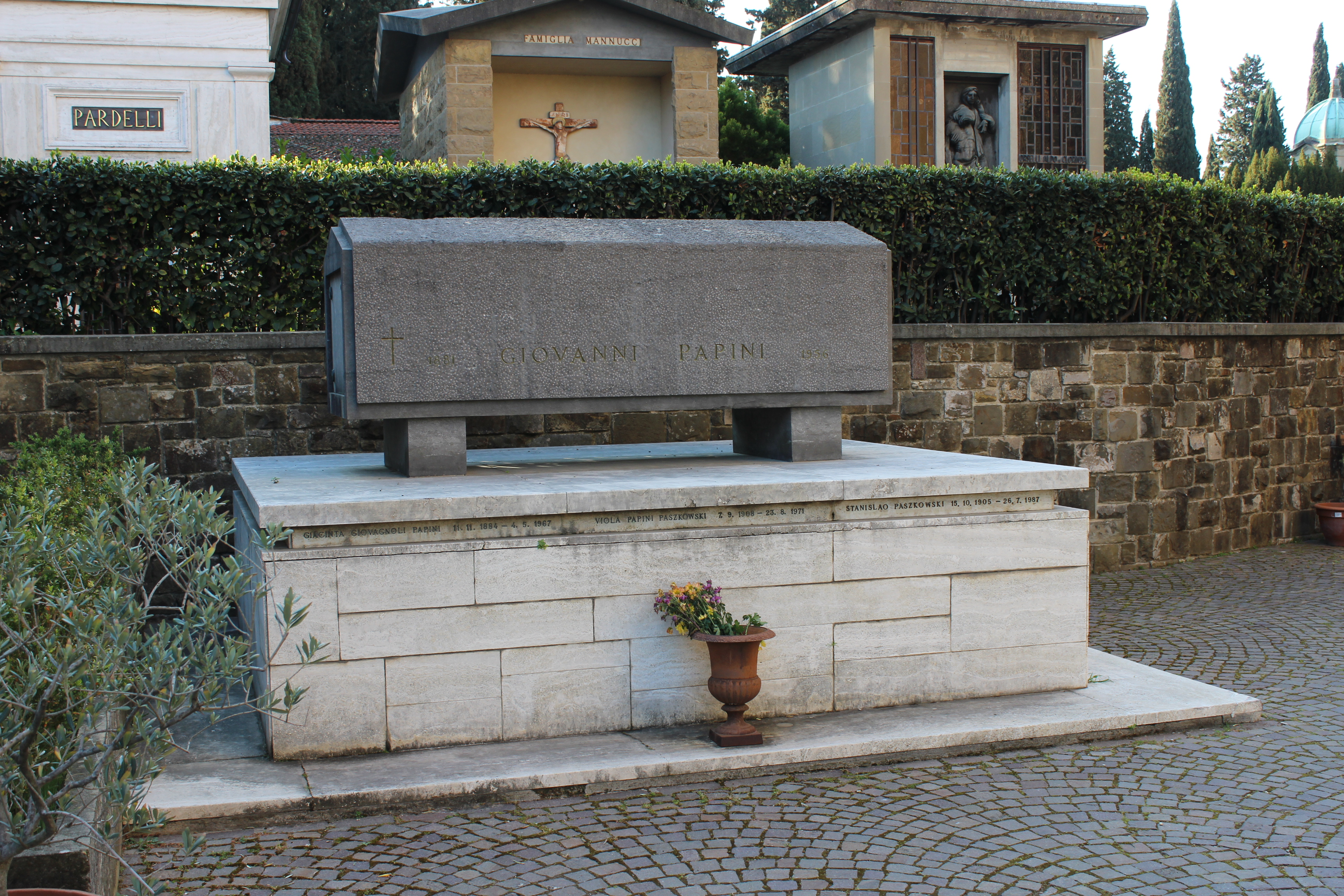
Papini's grave in the Cimitero delle Porte Sante in Florence.

According to art historian Richard Dorment, Francisco Franco's regime and NATO used Papini's series of imaginary interviews in the 1951 novel Il libro nero as propaganda against Pablo Picasso, to dramatically undercut his pro-Communist image. In 1962, the artist asked his biographer Pierre Daix, to expose the pretend interview, which he did in Les Lettres Françaises.

He was admired by Bruno de Finetti, founder of a subjective theory of probability, and Jorge Luis Borges, who remarked that Papini had been "unjustly forgotten" and included some of his stories in the Library of Babel.

== In popular culture ==
- Papini appears as a character in several poems of the period written by Mina Loy, who had an affair with him.
- Wallace Stevens wrote a poem called "Reply to Papini."
- Papini is repeatedly mentioned in speeches made by Colombian writer Gabriel García Marquez.

== Publications ==
- La Teoria Psicologica della Previsione (1902).
- Sentire Senza Agire e Agire Senza Sentire (1905).
- Il crepuscolo dei filosofi (1906).
- Lo specchio che fugge (1906)
- Il Tragico Quotidiano (1906).
- La Coltura Italiana (with Giuseppe Prezzolini, 1906).
- Il Pilota Cieco (1907).
- Le Memorie d'Iddio (1911).
- L'Altra Metà (1911).
- La Vita di Nessuno (1912).
- Parole e Sangue (1912).
- Un Uomo Finito (1913).
- Ventiquattro Cervelli (1913).
- Sul Pragmatismo: Saggi e Ricerche, 1903–1911 (1913).
- Almanacco Purgativo 1914 (with Ardengo Soffici et al., 1913).
- Buffonate (1914).
- Vecchio e Nuovo Nazionalismo (with Giuseppe Prezzolini, 1914).
- Cento Pagine di Poesia (1915).
- Maschilità (1915).
- La Paga del Sabato (1915).
- Stroncature (1916).
- Opera Prima (1917).
- Polemiche Religiose (1917).
- Testimonianze (1918).
- L'Uomo Carducci (1918).
- L'Europa Occidentale Contro la Mittel-Europa (1918).
- Chiudiamo le Scuole (1918).
- Giorni di Festa (1918).
- L'Esperienza Futurista (1919).
- Poeti d'Oggi (with Pietro Pancrazi, 1920).
- Storia di Cristo (1921).
- Antologia della Poesia Religiosa Italiana (1923).
- Dizionario dell'Omo Salvatico (with Domenico Giuliotti, 1923).
- L'Anno Santo e le Quattro Paci (1925).
- Pane e Vino (1926).
- Gli Operai della Vigna (1929).
- Sant'Agostino (1931).
- Gog (1931).
- La Scala di Giacobbe (1932).
- Firenze (1932).
- Il Sacco dell'Orco (1933).
- Dante Vivo (1933).
- Ardengo Soffici (1933).
- La Pietra Infernale (1934).
- Grandezze di Carducci (1935).
- I Testimoni della Passione (1937).
- Storia della Letteratura Italiana (1937).
- Italia Mia (1939).
- Figure Umane (1940).
- Medardo Rosso (1940).
- La Corona d'Argento (1941).
- Mostra Personale (1941).
- Prose di Cattolici Italiani d'Ogni Secolo (with Giuseppe De Luca, 1941).
- L'Imitazione del Padre. Saggi sul Rinascimento (1942).
- Racconti di Gioventù (1943).
- Cielo e Terra (1943).
- Foglie della Foresta (1946).
- Lettere agli Uomini di Papa Celestino VI (1946).
- Primo Conti (1947).
- Santi e Poeti (1948).
- Passato Remoto (1948).
- Vita di Michelangiolo (1949).
- Le Pazzie del Poeta (1950).
- Firenze Fiore del Mondo (with Ardengo Soffici, Piero Bargellini and Spadolini, 1950).
- Il libro nero (1951).
- Il Diavolo (1953).
- Il Bel Viaggio (with Enzo Palmeri, 1954).
- Concerto Fantastico (1954).
- Strane Storie (1954).
- La Spia del Mondo (1955).
- La Loggia dei Busti (1955).
- Le Felicità dell'Infelice (1956).

Posthumous

- L'Aurora della Letteratura Italiana: Da Jacopone da Todi a Franco Sacchetti (1956).
- Il Muro dei Gelsomini: Ricordi di Fanciullezza (1957).
- Giudizio Universale (1957).
- La Seconda Nascita (1958).
- Dichiarazione al Tipografo (1958).
- Città Felicità (1960).
- Diario (1962).
- Schegge (Articles published in Corriere della Sera, 1971).
- Rapporto sugli Uomini (1978).

=== Collected works ===
- Tutte le Opere di Giovanni Papini, 11 vols. Milan: Mondadori (1958–66).

=== Works in English translation ===
- Four and Twenty Minds. New York: Thomas Y. Crowell Company, 1922.
- The Story of Christ. London: Hodder and Stoughton, 1923 [Rep. as Life of Christ. New York: Harcourt, Brace and Co., 1923].
- The Failure. New York: Harcourt, Brace and Company, 1924.
- A Man — Finished. London: Hodder & Stoughton, 1924.
- The Memoirs of God. Boston: The Ball Publishing Co., 1926.
- A Hymn to Intelligence. Pittsburgh: The Laboratory Press, 1928.
- A Prayer for Fools, Particularly Those we See in Art Galleries, Drawing-rooms and Theatres. Pittsburgh: The Laboratory Press, 1929.
- Laborers in the Vineyard. London: Sheed & Ward, 1930.
- Life and Myself, translated by Dorothy Emmrich. New York: Brentano's, 1930.
- Saint Augustine. New York: Harcourt, Brace and Co., 1930.
- Gog, translated by Mary Prichard Agnetti. New York: Harcourt, Brace and Co., 1931.
- Dante Vivo. New York: The Macmillan Company, 1935.
- The Letters of Pope Celestine VI to All Mankind. New York: E.P. Dutton & Co., Inc., 1948.
- Florence: Flower of the World. Firenze: L'Arco, 1952 [with Ardengo Soffici and Piero Bargellini].
- Michelangelo, his Life and his Era. New York: E. P. Dutton, 1952.
- The Devil; Notes for Future Diabology. New York: E.P. Dutton, 1954 [London: Eyre & Spottiswoode, 1955].
- Nietzsche: An Essay. Mount Pleasant, Mich.: Enigma Press, 1966.
- "The Circle is Closing." In: Lawrence Rainey (ed.), Futurism: An Anthology, Yale University Press, 2009.

=== Selected articles ===
- "Philosophy in Italy," The Monist 8 (4), July 1903, pp. 553–585.
- "What Pragmatism is Like," Popular Science Monthly, Vol. LXXI, October 1907, pp. 351–358.
- "The Historical Play," The Little Review 6 (2), pp. 49–51.
- "Ignoto," The New Age 26 (6), 1919, p. 95.
- "Buddha," The New Age 26 (13), 1920, pp. 200–201.
- "Rudolph Eucken" The Open Court, 38 (5), May 1924, pp. 257–261.

=== Short stories ===
- "The Debt of a Day," The International 9 (4), 1915, pp. 105–107.
- "The Substitute Suicide," The International 10 (5), 1916, pp. 148–149.
- "Four-Hundred and Fifty-Three Love Letters," The Stratford Journal 3 (1), 1918, pp. 9–12.
- "The Beggar of Souls" The Stratford Journal 4, 1919, p. 59–64.
- "Life: The Vanishing Mirror," Vanity Fair 13 (6), 1920, p. 53.
- "Don Juan's Lament," Vanity Fair 13 (10), 1920, p. 43.
- "An Adventure in Introspection," Vanity Fair 13 (10), 1920, p. 65.
- "Having to do with Love – and Memory," Vanity Fair 14 (2), 1920, p. 69.
- "For no Reason," Vanity Fair 14 (3), 1920, pp. 71, 116.
- "The Prophetic Portrait," Vanity Fair 14 (4), 1920, p. 73.
- "The Man who Lost Himself," Vanity Fair 14 (5), 1920, p. 35.
- "Hope," Vanity Fair 14 (6), 1920, p. 57.
- "The Magnanimous Suicide," Vanity Fair 15 (1), 1920, p. 73.
- "The Lost Day," Vanity Fair 15 (3), 1920, pp. 79, 106.
- "Two Faces in the Well," Vanity Fair 15 (4), 1920, p. 41.
- "Two Interviews with the Devil," Vanity Fair 15 (5), 1921, pp. 59, 94.
- "The Bartered Souls," Vanity Fair 15 (6), 1921, p. 57.
- "The Man Who Could Not be Emperor," Vanity Fair 16 (1), 1921, p. 41.
- "A Man Among Men — No More," Vanity Fair 16 (2), 1921, p.
- "His Own Jailer," The Living Age, December 9, 1922.
- "Pallas and the Centaur," Italian Literary Digest 1 (1), April 1947.

== See also ==
- Giovanni Vailati
