= Sorrell and Son =

Sorrell and Son may refer to:

- Sorrell and Son (novel), a 1925 novel by Warwick Deeping
- Sorrell and Son (1927 film), a film based on the novel
- Sorrell and Son (1934 film), a film based on the novel
- Sorrell and Son (TV series), a 1984 British mini-series based on the novel
