= Publishers Weekly list of bestselling novels in the United States in the 1920s =

This is a list of bestselling novels in the United States in the 1920s, as determined by Publishers Weekly. The list features the most popular novels of each year from 1920 through 1929.

The standards set for inclusion in the lists – which, for example, led to the exclusion of the novels in the Harry Potter series from the lists for the 1990s and 2000s – are currently unknown.

== 1920 ==
1. The Man of the Forest by Zane Grey
2. Kindred of the Dust by Peter B. Kyne
3. The Re-Creation of Brian Kent by Harold Bell Wright
4. The River's End by James Oliver Curwood
5. A Man for the Ages by Irving Bacheller
6. Mary-Marie by Eleanor H. Porter
7. The Portygee by Joseph C. Lincoln
8. The Great Impersonation by E. Phillips Oppenheim
9. The Lamp in the Desert by Ethel M. Dell
10. Harriet and the Piper by Kathleen Norris

== 1921 ==
1. Main Street by Sinclair Lewis
2. The Brimming Cup by Dorothy Canfield
3. The Mysterious Rider by Zane Grey
4. The Age of Innocence by Edith Wharton
5. The Valley of Silent Men by James Oliver Curwood
6. The Sheik by Edith M. Hull
7. A Poor Wise Man by Mary Roberts Rinehart
8. Her Father's Daughter by Gene Stratton-Porter
9. The Sisters-in-Law by Gertrude Atherton
10. The Kingdom Round the Corner by Coningsby Dawson

== 1922 ==
1. If Winter Comes by A. S. M. Hutchinson
2. The Sheik by Edith M. Hull
3. Gentle Julia by Booth Tarkington
4. The Head of the House of Coombe by Frances Hodgson Burnett
5. Simon Called Peter by Robert Keable
6. The Breaking Point by Mary Roberts Rinehart
7. This Freedom by A. S. M. Hutchinson
8. Maria Chapdelaine by Louis Hémon
9. To the Last Man by Zane Grey
10. Tie: Babbitt by Sinclair Lewis and Helen of the Old House by Harold Bell Wright

== 1923 ==
1. Black Oxen by Gertrude Atherton
2. His Children's Children by Arthur Train
3. The Enchanted April by "Elizabeth"
4. Babbitt by Sinclair Lewis
5. The Dim Lantern by Temple Bailey
6. This Freedom by A. S. M. Hutchinson
7. The Mine with the Iron Door by Harold Bell Wright
8. Wanderer of the Wasteland by Zane Grey
9. The Sea Hawk by Rafael Sabatini
10. The Breaking Point by Mary Roberts Rinehart

== 1924 ==
1. So Big by Edna Ferber
2. The Plastic Age by Percy Marks
3. The Little French Girl by Anne Douglas Sedgwick
4. The Heirs Apparent by Philip Gibbs
5. A Gentleman of Courage by James Oliver Curwood
6. The Call of the Canyon by Zane Grey
7. The Midlander by Booth Tarkington
8. The Coast of Folly by Coningsby Dawson
9. Mistress Wilding by Rafael Sabatini
10. The Homemaker by Dorothy Canfield Fisher

== 1925 ==
1. Soundings by A. Hamilton Gibbs
2. The Constant Nymph by Margaret Kennedy
3. The Keeper of the Bees by Gene Stratton-Porter
4. Glorious Apollo by E. Barrington
5. The Green Hat by Michael Arlen
6. The Little French Girl by Anne Douglas Sedgwick
7. Arrowsmith by Sinclair Lewis
8. The Perennial Bachelor by Anne Parrish
9. The Carolinian by Rafael Sabatini
10. One Increasing Purpose by A. S. M. Hutchinson

== 1926 ==
1. The Private Life of Helen of Troy by John Erskine
2. Gentlemen Prefer Blondes by Anita Loos
3. Sorrell and Son by Warwick Deeping
4. The Hounds of Spring by Sylvia Thompson
5. Beau Sabreur by P. C. Wren
6. The Silver Spoon by John Galsworthy
7. Beau Geste by P. C. Wren
8. Show Boat by Edna Ferber
9. After Noon by Susan Ertz
10. The Blue Window by Temple Bailey

== 1927 ==
1. Elmer Gantry by Sinclair Lewis
2. The Plutocrat by Booth Tarkington
3. Doomsday by Warwick Deeping
4. Sorrell and Son by Warwick Deeping
5. Jalna by Mazo de la Roche
6. Lost Ecstasy by Mary Roberts Rinehart
7. Twilight Sleep by Edith Wharton
8. Tomorrow Morning by Anne Parrish
9. The Old Countess by Anne Douglas Sedgwick
10. A Good Woman by Louis Bromfield

== 1928 ==
1. The Bridge of San Luis Rey by Thornton Wilder
2. Wintersmoon by Hugh Walpole
3. Swan Song by John Galsworthy
4. The Greene Murder Case by S. S. Van Dine
5. Bad Girl by Viña Delmar
6. Claire Ambler by Booth Tarkington
7. Old Pybus by Warwick Deeping
8. All Kneeling by Anne Parrish
9. Jalna by Mazo de la Roche
10. The Strange Case of Miss Annie Spragg by Louis Bromfield

== 1929 ==
1. All Quiet on the Western Front by Erich Maria Remarque
2. Dodsworth by Sinclair Lewis
3. Dark Hester by Anne Douglas Sedgwick
4. The Bishop Murder Case by S. S. Van Dine
5. Roper's Row by Warwick Deeping
6. Peder Victorious by O. E. Rolvaag
7. Mamba's Daughters by DuBose Heyward
8. The Galaxy by Susan Ertz
9. Scarlet Sister Mary by Julia Peterkin
10. Joseph and His Brethren by H. W. Freeman
