= Sorrell and Son (TV series) =

- Genre: Drama
- Based on: Sorrell and Son by Warwick Deeping
- Screenplay by: Jeremy Paul
- Directed by: Derek Bennett
- Composer: Patrick Gowers
- Country of origin: United Kingdom
- Original language: English
- No. of series: 1
- No. of episodes: 6

Production
- Executive producer: David Cunliffe
- Producer: Derek Bennett
- Running time: 60 minutes
- Production company: Yorkshire Television

Original release
- Network: ITV
- Release: 6 June – 11 July 1984

Sorrell and Son is a British television miniseries which aired on ITV in six, hour-long episodes from 6 June to 11 July 1984. The story is taken from the 1925 novel of the same name by Warwick Deeping. The story was previously filmed as a silent film in 1927 and again in 1934.

The television miniseries was produced by Yorkshire Television and it starred Richard Pasco and John Shrapnel

== Plot summary ==
In post-World War I England, impoverished Captain Stephen Sorrell, M.C. (Richard Pasco) must raise his son Kit (Paul Critchley) by himself, after his wife walks out on him. Captain Sorrell's years of devotion and sacrifice for his son come to fruition years in the future.

== Cast ==
- Richard Pasco as Stephen Sorrell, M.C. (6 episodes)
- John Shrapnel as Thomas Roland (6 episodes)
- Gwen Watford as Dora Sorrell (4 episodes)
- Paul Crichtley as young Kit Sorrell (3 episodes)
- Peter Chelsom as Kit Sorrell (4 episodes)
- Prunella Ransome as Fanny Garland (4 episodes)
- Sarah Neville as Molly Pentreath (3 episodes)
- Michael Troughton as Maurice (3 episodes)
- Elizabeth Sinclair as Cherry (3 episodes)
- Eve Pearce as Mrs. Marks (2 episodes)
- Stephanie Tague as Kate (2 episodes)
- Stephanie Beacham as Florence Palfrey (1 episode)
- Malcolm Terris as John Palfrey (1 episode)
- Edward Peel as Buck (1 episode)
- Simon Shepherd as Duncan Scott (1 episode)
- Andrew Bicknell as Blane (1 episode)
- Norman Wooland as Dr. Wheelan (1 episode)
- Ron Pember as Maggs (1 episode)
- Mark Eden as Oscar Wolffe (1 episode)
- Christopher Bramwell as Phelps (1 episode)
- John Horsley as Porteous (1 episode)
- Peter Ivatts as Billiard player (1 episode)
- Noel Johnson as Colonel (1 episode)
- Barbara Kinghorn as American (1 episode)
- Miranda Richardson as Lola (1 episode)
- Dorothy Vernon as Lady Pentreath (1 episode)

== Reception ==
Writing for the Los Angeles Times, Terry Atkinson called the series "a tolerable drama about some very likable people", but with a caveat: "These people are too likable--unrealistically caring, kind and resigned. Or, in rare cases when someone less than a saint shows up, he or she flaunts the transparently despicable characteristics of a Snidely Whiplash. Everyone's either a dear old soul or a scoundrel." He summarized it as "mildly engrossing fare."

== Bibliography ==
- Jerry Roberts. Encyclopedia of Television Film Directors. Scarecrow Press, 2009.
