= Doomsday (novel) =

1927 novel by Warwick Deeping

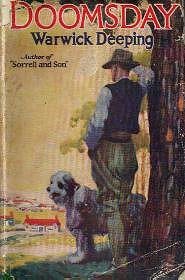
- First edition (UK)
- Author: Warwick Deeping
- Language: English
- Genre: Romance, Novel
- Publisher: Cassell (UK); Alfred A. Knopf (US)
- Publication date: 1927
- Publication place: United Kingdom
- Pages: 372
- ISBN: 1-4179-3096-9

Doomsday is a novel by Warwick Deeping which was published in 1927.

Set in post-1918, rural Sussex, the story revolves around a girl with aspirations to leave her small town, as well as her relationship with a man living on a local acreage, known as the Doomsday Farm.

Released after his big seller Sorrell and Son, Doomsday was also successful, and became the third-best selling book in the United States for 1927.

The novel was developed into a movie of the same name released in 1928 and which starred Florence Vidor and Gary Cooper.
