= Two Sinners =

1935 film by Arthur Lubin

- Directed by: Arthur Lubin
- Written by: Jefferson Parker
- Based on: Two Black Sheep by Warwick Deeping
- Produced by: Trem Carr
- Starring: Otto Kruger; Martha Sleeper; Minna Gombell; Ferdinand Munier; Cora Sue Collins; Margaret Seddon; Harrington Reynolds
- Cinematography: Harry Neumann
- Edited by: Jack Ogilvie
- Production company: Trem Carr Productions
- Distributed by: Republic Pictures
- Release date: September 12, 1935
- Running time: 72 minutes
- Country: United States
- Language: English

Two Sinners is a 1935 film directed by Arthur Lubin.

== Plot ==
In London, Henry Vane gets out of prison after serving fifteen years for murder and tries to rebuild his life.

== Cast ==
- Otto Kruger as Henry Vane
- Martha Sleeper as Elsie Summerstone
- Minna Gombell as Claudine Pym
- Ferdinand Munier as Monte Alabaster
- Cora Sue Collins as Sally Pym
- Margaret Seddon as Mrs. Summerstone
- Harrington Reynolds as Major Ritchie
- Fred Walton as Shepley
- Olaf Hytten as French judge
- Montague Shaw as Humphrey Grylls
- William P. Carleton as Heggie
- Harold Entwistle as Pateman

== Production ==
The working title of Two Sinners was Two Black Sheep, the title of the 1933 Warwick Deeping novel on which it was based. The novel had become a best seller. In May 1935, Republic announced they would make a film of the novel. The same month, Arthur Lubin signed a contract with Republic for a year to make six pictures starting with the book Two Black Sheep that became the film Two Sinners.

Otto Kruger was cast in July 1935.

== Release ==
Two Sinners was released as a second feature in some U.S. theaters alongside the Kay Francis vehicle The Goose and the Gander.

The film impressed the holders of the rights to a W.W. Jacobs story which persuaded them to sell it to Lubin years later to make Footsteps in the Fog.
