= Doomsday (1928 film) =

1928 film

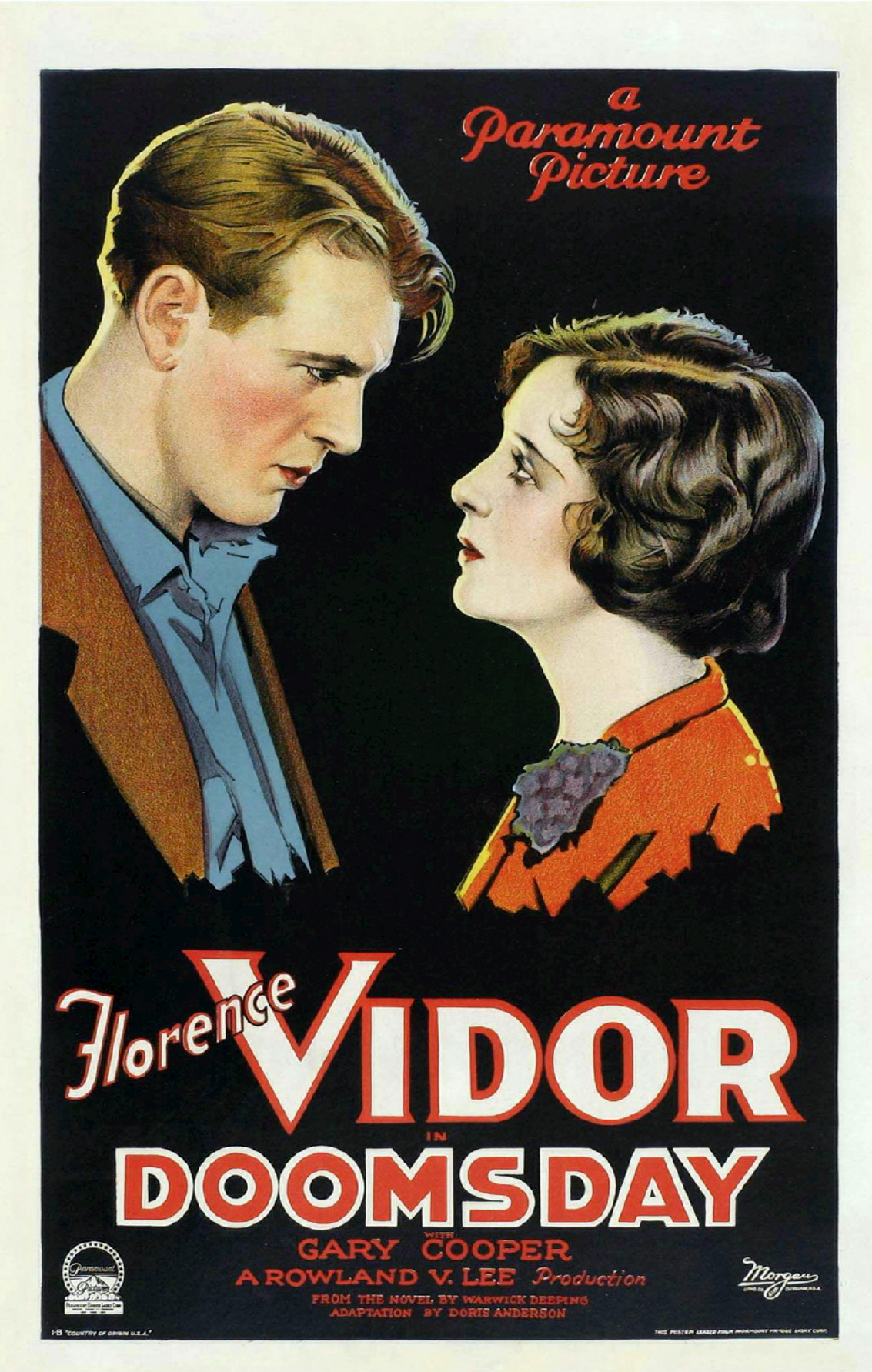
- Theatrical release poster
- Directed by: Rowland V. Lee
- Written by: Julian Johnson (titles); Donald W. Lee
- Story by: Doris Anderson
- Based on: Doomsday by Warwick Deeping
- Produced by: Jesse L. Lasky; Rowland V. Lee; Hector Turnbull; Adolph Zukor
- Starring: Florence Vidor; Gary Cooper
- Cinematography: Henry W. Gerrard
- Edited by: Robert Bassler
- Production company: Paramount Pictures
- Distributed by: Paramount Pictures
- Release date: February 18, 1928 (USA)
- Running time: 60 minutes
- Country: United States
- Language: English

Doomsday is a surviving 1928 American romantic drama silent film directed by Rowland V. Lee and starring Florence Vidor and Gary Cooper. Written by Julian Johnson, Donald W. Lee, and Doris Anderson, based on the 1927 novel Doomsday by Warwick Deeping, the film is about a woman who marries a wealthy landowner to escape her life of poverty, leaving behind the handsome farmer she truly loves. Produced by Jesse L. Lasky, Rowland V. Lee, Hector Turnbull, and Adolph Zukor for Paramount Pictures, Doomsday was released on February 18, 1928, in the United States.

== Plot ==
In Sussex, England after the Great War, former aristocrat Mary Viner (Florence Vidor) and her father, retired sea captain Hesketh Viner (Charles A. Stevenson), live in a small humble cottage on Doomsday, a large and valuable farm property owned by a wealthy landlord named Percival Fream (Lawrence Grant). Mary is attracted to another tenant at Doomsday, Arnold Furze (Gary Cooper), a young ex-officer and farmer who works the land with pride as if it were his own. Soon she and Arnold fall in love, but she longs to escape her oppressive poverty.

Meanwhile, the self-made wealthy landlord Percival develops an attraction to Mary and hopes to marry the former aristocrat as evidence of his rising social status. One day middle-aged Percival makes his intentions known to Mary, who cannot resist his palatial home and the lifestyle he offers her. Despite her love for Arnold, she selfishly agrees to marry Percival. After the wedding, they leave Mary's infirm father in the care of a nurse and sail to the Continent and spend the next year living abroad. During that time, Percival gives her jewelry and expensive dresses, but does not give her the love she desires. He treats her as just another one of his belongings to display in front of his friends.

Eventually, Mary discovers that the lifestyle she chose has not brought her happiness and that her loveless marriage to Percival was a mistake. After she learns of her father's death, she asks Percival for an annulment. Left with no money and no place to live, Mary ends up at Arnold's cottage and humbly offers to work for him as a housekeeper. Still feeling betrayed by Mary's earlier rejection of their love, Arnold cautiously accepts her offer, but for the next six months, he treats her in an insensitive and overbearing manner. Gradually, their love is rekindled, Arnold atones for his harsh behavior, and the two once again find happiness in each other.

== Cast ==
- Florence Vidor as Mary Viner
- Gary Cooper as Arnold Furze
- Lawrence Grant as Percival Fream
- Charles A. Stevenson as Capt. Hesketh Viner
- Tom Ricketts as Percival's Butler (uncredited)
- Frederick Sullivan as Percival's Associate (uncredited)

== Production ==
The screenplay for the film is based on the 1927 novel Doomsday by Warwick Deeping.

== Critical response ==
Doomsday received poor reviews upon its theatrical release. In his review for the New York Times, Mordaunt Hall wrote that despite the "praiseworthy acting" of Florence Vidor, Gary Cooper and Lawrence Grant, the film was "somewhat lethargic, ineffectual and shallow" and "sadly lacking in dramatic tension". Hall holds the director responsible for most of the film's shortcomings.

Only a few instances does Rowland V. Lee, the director, succeed in giving through his animated images a clear conception of the action; he relies invariably on the sub-titles to explain matters instead of using his camera. Incessent [sic] arguments with close-ups stressing fiery eyes and busy lips are not particularly absorbing ... Both the distressing and the supposedly cheerful episodes are contrived in a haphazard fashion.

Hall concludes that Cooper's acting is "wonderfully natural" and gives the character "an ingratiating personality". Vidor is "equally competent" in her performance, but is undermined by Lee's "unimaginative direction".
