= No Hero =

No Hero may refer to:

- No Hero (comics), a 2008–2009 comics series by Warren Ellis
- "No Hero" (song), a 2016 song by Elisa
- "No Hero", a 1992 song by the Offspring from Ignition
- No Hero, a 2024 album by Desperate Journalist
- No Hero, a 1992 film featuring Steve Hofmeyr
- No Hero, a 2008–2015 light-novel series by Yu Wo
- No Hero: The Evolution of a Navy SEAL, a 2014 autobiography by Matt Bissonnette

== See also ==
- No Hero–This, a 1936 war novel by Warwick Deeping
- No Heroes, a 2006 album by Converge
- No Heroics, a 2008 British superhero comedy TV series
