= Two Black Sheep =

1933 novel by Warwick Deeping

- First edition (UK)
- Author: Warwick Deeping
- Language: English
- Publisher: Cassell (UK); Alfred A. Knopf (US); McClelland & Stewart (Canada)
- Publication date: 1933
- Publication place: United Kingdom
- Media type: Print

Two Black Sheep is a 1933 novel by the British writer Warwick Deeping. Like another novel Exile that Deeping wrote three years earlier, it is set in contemporary Italy and shows some admiration for the Fascist regime of Benito Mussolini.

In 1935 it was adapted into an American film Two Sinners.

== Bibliography ==
- Mary Grover. The Ordeal of Warwick Deeping: Middlebrow Authorship and Cultural Embarrassment. Associated University Presse, 2009.
