= Stephanie Tague =

English actress (born 1966)

Stephanie Tague (born 1966) is an English actress who was active in film and television during the 1980s. Her earliest role was as Victoria Dennison in the 1982 British children's television series Andy Robson. She went on to play the part of Michelle Robinson in the long-running British soap opera Coronation Street.

== Filmography ==
=== Films ===
- Singleton's Pluck (1984)

=== Television ===
- Andy Robson (1982), as Victoria Dennison
- Robin of Sherwood (1984), as Lady Mildred de Bracy
- Sorrell and Son (1984)
- Coronation Street (1985), as Michelle Robinson
