= The Man Who Went Back =

1940 novel by Warwick Deeping

- First edition (UK)
- Author: Warwick Deeping
- Cover artist: Rowland Hilder
- Language: English
- Genre: Science fiction novel
- Publisher: Cassell and Co (UK); Alfred A. Knopf (US); McClelland & Stewart (Canada)
- Publication date: 1940 (November 11, 1940 in United States)
- Publication place: United Kingdom
- Media type: Print (Hardback)
- Pages: 382 pp
- Text: The Man Who Went Back at Internet Archive

The Man Who Went Back (1940) is an adventure novel by Warwick Deeping about a man who has a car accident in 1939 England. He is transported back into post-Roman Britain and has to contend with the knowledge that he is from the future, in the past.

Upon release, the New York Times described the book as a "remarkable merger" of Deeping's prior novels with "cloak-and-sword" settings and those set in contemporary times, resulting in an "odd but earnest novel."
