= Andy Robson =

1982 British children's television series

- Genre: Children's drama
- Written by: Ted Childs
- Directed by: Tony Kysh
- Starring: Tom Davidson; Stephanie Tague; Stevie-Lee Pattinson
- Ending theme: "The Best of Friends" by Barbara Dickson
- Composer: BA Robertson & Alan Parker
- Country of origin: United Kingdom
- Original language: English
- No. of series: 2
- No. of episodes: 20

Production
- Producer: Michael W. Esthop
- Running time: 25 mins
- Production company: Tyne Tees Television

Original release
- Network: ITV
- Release: 9 June 1982 – 21 July 1983

Andy Robson is a 1982 British children's television series, produced by Tyne Tees Television, which aired on the ITV network for two series in 1982 and 1983. It was based on Frederick Grice's novel The Courage of Andy Robson, published in 1969.

== Plot ==
Set in Edwardian England and starring Tom Davidson as the eponymous hero, the series concerned the adventures of Andy, who had been sent from a coal mining town in County Durham in North East England, to live with his aunt and uncle in rural Northumberland after his father was injured in a pit accident. The series also starred Stephanie Tague and Stevie-Lee Pattinson as Victoria and Alec, two of Andy's friends in his new surroundings.

== Cast ==
Tom Davidson	Andy Robson
Stevie-Lee Pattinson	Alec Cowen
Stephanie Tague	Victoria Dennison
Jack Watling	Matthew Dennison
Norman Jones	Adam Charlton
Marlene Sidaway	Florrie Charlton
Peter Bagley	Dickie Cowen
Richard Steele	PC Pierce
Malcolm Terris	Mr Craggs
Jill Greenacre	Helga Mueller
George Sewell	Peter Mueller
Jeremy Mawdsley	Billy Craggs
Katja Kersten	Frederika Mueller
Eric Nicholson	Inspector Tyler
Gordon Griffin	Mr Robson
Richard Wilson	Mr Ridley
Rosalind Bailey	Mrs Robson
Elizabeth Edmonds	Miss Inskip
Alan Foss	Lord Rothwick
Sheri Shepstone	Bessie Reed
Jonathan Burn	Harris
Michael Gough	Arthur
Ivor Salter	PC Coates
Anthony Steel	Herbert Neville
Hayley Purvis	School Child
David Levison	Tom Ritson

== Production ==
=== Music ===
The series' theme tune, "The Best of Friends" was written by BA Robertson and Alan Parker and sung by Barbara Dickson. A full song running 3'20" was recorded but remained unreleased until 2021, when it was included on Dickson's "Heartbeats" CD. A separately-recorded abridged version accompanied the closing credits.
