= Wintersmoon =

1928 novel

- First US edition
- Author: Hugh Walpole
- Language: English
- Genre: Drama / Romance
- Publisher: Macmillan (UK); Doubleday, Doran (US)
- Publication date: 1928
- Publication place: United Kingdom
- Media type: Print

Wintersmoon is a 1928 romance novel by the British writer Hugh Walpole. It pits two rival couples against each other one representing modernity and the other traditionalism with the latter ultimately triumphing.

In the United States it was included on the Publishers Weekly list of bestselling novels of 1928, second behind Thornton Wilder's The Bridge of San Luis Rey.

== Bibliography ==
- Krueger, Christine L. Encyclopedia of British Writers: 19th and 20th Centuries. Infobase Publishing, 2014.
