= No Hero–This =

1936 novel by Warwick Deeping

- Author: Warwick Deeping
- Language: English
- Genre: War
- Publisher: Cassell
- Publication date: 1936
- Publication place: United Kingdom
- Media type: Print

No Hero–This is a 1936 war novel by the British author Warwick Deeping. It was inspired by Deeping's own experiences serving with the Royal Army Medical Corps during the First World War. It provides a more balanced view of heroics with the war's realities.

== Bibliography ==
- Crouthamel, Jason & Leese, Peter. Psychological Trauma and the Legacies of the First World War. Springer, 2016.
- Grover, Mary. The Ordeal of Warwick Deeping: Middlebrow Authorship and Cultural Embarrassment. Associated University Presse, 2009.
- Onions, John. English Fiction and Drama of the Great War, 1918–39. Springer, 1990.
