= Old Pybus =

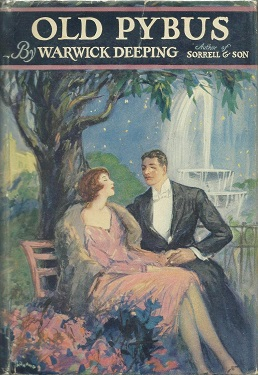
First US edition (publ. Alfred A. Knopf)

Old Pybus is a 1928 novel by the English author Warwick Deeping. It centers around a London bookshop proprietor and relationship with his sons. He is estranged from them as they refused to enlist in World War I. Many years later, now a hotelier, he meets a young book-lover who stops into his inn. Unbeknownst to him, it is his grandson. The book was published by Alfred A. Knopf.
