= Twilight Sleep (novel) =

1927 novel by Edith Wharton

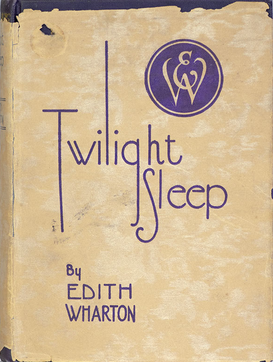
- First edition dust jacket cover
- Author: Edith Wharton
- Language: English
- Published: February 5–May 12, 1927 in Pictorial Review
- Publisher: D. Appleton & Company
- Publication date: May 12, 1927
- Publication place: United States
- Media type: Print (hardcover)
- Pages: 373
- OCLC: 1520813
- Dewey Decimal: 813/.52
- LC Class: PZ3.W555 Tw PS3545.H16

Twilight Sleep is a novel by American author Edith Wharton and was first published in 1927 as a serial in the Pictorial Review before being published as a novel in the same year. The story, filled with irony, is centered around a socialite family navigating the New York of the Jazz Age and their relationships. This novel landed at number one on the best-selling list just two months after its publication and finished the year at number 7. Even as a best selling novel Twilight Sleep was not well received by critics at the time, who, while appreciating Wharton as a writer, struggled with the scenarios and characters she had created in the novel. While it was not considered as such in its own time period, today Twilight Sleep is widely considered to be a modernist novel as it employs modernist literary devices, such as an ever changing narration among the novel's characters and a close examination of the characters' self-identities and relationships with one another.

The novel's U.S. copyright expired on January 1, 2023, when all works published in 1927 entered the public domain.

== Summary ==
Twilight Sleep is a satirical novel about the lives and relationships of an extended and dysfunctional family in New York in the 1920s. The most prominent storyline follows the family's combined efforts to keep the marriage of Jim and Lita Wyant intact, as Lita has become bored with the relationship and is seeking a divorce from Jim. While this storyline threads itself through the novel, the reader is taken into the different characters' own storylines and perspectives as the narrative is passed from one character to the next. There is Pauline's self-inflicted busy schedule, Nona's love interest in a married man, Arthur's infirmity, Lita's partying, dancing, and movie star aspirations, and Dexter's affairs. Dexter's affair with Lita is what brings the reader to the climax of the story where Arthur arrives at the families' cottage and attempts to shoot the man whom Lita is having an affair with (Dexter). He misses and instead hits Nona, who presumably came to Lita's room to confront her father and Lita about the affair. The novel ends with Nona recovering and the rest of the family all taking trips out of the country as a way to physically and emotionally escape what had happened. The novel is left unresolved, as none of the characters have seemed to grow or change from their experiences and continue to live a life of avoidance.

== Background ==
Twilight Sleep was serialized in the Pictorial Review and illustrated by C.J. McCarthy beginning in February 1927. It was published in four parts: once a month from February- May of that year.

At the time of her writing and publishing Twilight Sleep, Edith Wharton was living in France and had ceased living in or visiting the United States.

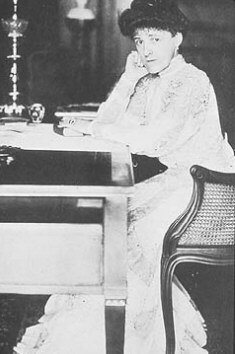
Wharton in 1915

== Historical context ==
=== Twilight Sleep ===
In the 1920s, American Literature the motif of escape is ever present, and in Wharton's Twilight Sleep this theme drives a melodramatic plot. Twilight sleep was a medical procedure in which pregnant women would be given a mixture of the drugs scopolamine and morphine as a way to simultaneously reduce the pain of childbirth and allow the mother to forget the experience altogether. In the novel, Lita experiences twilight sleep with the birth of her child, but she also uses twilight sleep as a metaphor for the way Americans in the 1920s seemed to do everything in their power to avoid pain and to search for quick fixes to their problems. She does this through her depictions of her characters and their own avoidances of pain and suffering.

Twilight Sleep is one of the ways that Wharton expressed her objections to modern science and its goal of relieving humans from suffering. The 1920s was a time of industrialization and Fordist thinking, where everything should be made easy and that one's personal life could be organized to be made more efficient in the same way that one's working life could be. Wharton was also very critical of this new way of thinking in America and her criticism plays out in Pauline's character who subscribes to this kind of lifestyle, but is still left feeling all the pains and sorrows of human life no matter how hard she works to avoid it.

== Characters ==
=== Nona Manford ===
Nona is the daughter of Pauline and Dexter Manford and half-sister to Jim Wyant. Nona is a flapper of the jazz age (though she identifies herself in this way more out of societal expectation than of a true want for that lifestyle) and stands as the novel's protagonist as she begins and ends the narrative. She is the driving force for the novel's biggest plot thread, which is trying to save Jim and Lita Wyant's marriage. Nona's unhappiness in the novel comes from her own struggle with relationships as she is in love with the married Stanley Heuston, whose wife will not grant him a divorce.

=== Pauline Manford ===
Pauline is the mother of Nona Manford and Jim Wyant. She was previously married to Arthur Wyant with whom she got a divorce. She went on to marry her divorce attorney and current husband Dexter Manford. Pauline is an incredibly busy woman, though this busyness is entirely self-inflicted. She prefers to have every hour of her life mapped out in a schedule and when she is left with an empty hour she is pained by the prospect of trying to spontaneously fill this hour. Diane Lichtenstein asserts that Pauline's self-proclaimed efficiency is really just a shield she uses against the pains and sufferings of life.

=== Lita Wyant ===
Lita is the wife of Jim Wyant and the mother of a child, though she is seeking a divorce from Jim in the novel. Lita is the epitome of the 1920s flapper image. She's athletic, with her favorite pass time being to go out to clubs and to dance. Her greatest aspiration is to become a movie star. She is an orphan and some critics of the novel assert that her origins are purposefully left a mystery as Lita's character is firmly placed alongside Harlem culture and this connection and her unknown origins may hint at Lita being of a race other than white. However, some critics speak on Wharton's use of Harlem in Twilight Sleep as nothing more than a metaphor for the oft reviled sexual liberation of white flapper women, which can also be seen being represented through Lita's character.

=== Arthur Wyant ===
Arthur is Pauline's ex-husband and Jim's father. His character is viewed by the others as infirm and old-fashioned. Arthur is of the old New York society and his character and his relationship to Pauline (a character representative of new wealth) serve as a representation of new wealth invading the old wealth of New York.

== Themes ==
=== Body image ===
During the 1920s, media platforms such as advertisements and film began to surface with the goal of popularizing this new idea of the perfect female body. With the trending use of cosmetics, as well as cosmetic surgery, becoming more available during this time, women, in particular, pounced on the idea of altering their bodies accordingly to fit in with these standards. Edith Wharton's 1927 novel Twilight Sleep, reflects these similar trends in a number of ways.

The novel essentially has three main female protagonists, and readers follow their daily lives throughout the novel. These main characters being Pauline, Lita and Nona. Each of these female characters has a different relationship with their body, and each has taken on a different literary role concerning 1920s technology of the female body. Beginning with Pauline, she has used new technological advances of the time, in order to work on tailoring her body to the 1920s idea of perfection. From the very beginning of the novel we see how Pauline Manford has an extremely busy schedule, full of techniques that she believes will alter her body and mind. As she makes her many attempts at rejuvenating her body, she often forgets about her own children and has very little time for them as a result. In addition to this Pauline's body is constantly on the move, making her one of the most efficient characters in this sense. Her body is consistently at work and goes from either running her home to achieving her many public duties outside of the home. As a female character set in the 1920s, Pauline spends a huge amount of time working and improving on her body and image.

On the other hand, Lita is the character within the novel who serves as the overall image of these new beauty standards. While this does come with a downfall as well, as the women in Lita's life try to prevent her body from being used to attract men. For example, Nona follows Lita to multiple parties with the idea of keeping an eye on her. While Pauline attempts to talk Lita out of getting involved in movies and dancing, and instead pushes her towards focusing on being a housewife. Whereas Nona undergoes the pain of always comparing herself to Lita, and feeling as though she is hidden behind Lita's shadow. Although at the end of the novel, this is the same body that saves her family, as she essentially takes a bullet for them. Unlike her mother, Nona remains skeptical of these new technologies used on women's exterior, and is the character who ends up staying most true to herself.

=== Marriage, relationships, and divorce ===
The most prominent theme in Twilight Sleep is the dysfunctional relationships that the characters have with one another. This is especially significant in terms of romantic relationships, marriage, and divorce. In the 1920s, marriage was a key life goal for women, but divorce was becoming more acceptable and the number of divorced couples was on the rise. This cultural shift is what Wharton chooses to focus on in Twilight Sleep. Through her characters, Wharton seemingly asserts that these breakdowns in relationships are tied to a lack of communication and sense of identity within the characters. All of the characters in this novel struggle to understand themselves and this makes it nearly impossible for them to understand each other. This lack of communication and moments of misunderstanding can be most clearly seen with Pauline and her interactions with others, especially with her husband Dexter. During a dinner party she feels that she's done something special for Dexter when she sets him next to Mrs. Toy, believing that Dexter gains pleasure from flirting with her. In reality Dexter has no social interest in Mrs. Toy and it isn't until later that he has a purely sexual interest and has an affair with her.

Wharton's characters are a display of the modern personalities of the 1920s, personalities that are often dull, shallow, and selfish. The characters' need for a stronger sense of self identity leads them to be selfish and hold no loyalties to those they have relationships with Lita is a perfect example of this as she becomes increasingly bored with her life and her relationships. She wants more for herself and continuing to be married to Jim does not fit into the identity she is seeking for herself.

The characters' inability to communicate and self-identify are key factors in the breakdown of their relationships and the divorce/want for a divorce that result. Twilight Sleep shows the shift in the cultural perception of marriage from a symbol of wholeness and personal completion to that of a burden on one's self-identity.

== Reception ==
When the Pictorial Review published Twilight Sleep as a serialized story, the headline proclaimed it "the finest novel of New York society", and the sales seem to agree. Twilight Sleep appears on many lists, such as Publishers Weekly, in the top ten bestsellers of 1927, but upon its release, the critics were largely underwhelmed. Percy Hutchison wrote in The New York Times that he did not believe Wharton could live up to Ethan Frome and The House of Mirth, but he mostly begins his review praising her and her past works. He uses these works to excuse certain shortcomings of Twilight Sleep: "But she maintains herself at so consistently high a level that any occasional faltering of the imagination may be charitably set down as nothing more serious than a change of pace, any lapse in artistry as a mere peccadillo of the pen". Edmund Wilson of The New Republic is less critical of the novel, as well, and finds Wharton's loss "of her old harshness" to be an acceptable turn and uses it to excuse her novel being "proportionately less vivid". Like Hutchison and Wilson, many of the other reviewers appear to have had a great appreciation for Wharton's work in itself, but they had much to say about this one not quite adding up to the others.

America voiced a concern "that her latest novel "Twilight Sleep" is an inartistic abandonment of her former office of telling what ought to be known about well-bred people in order to describe the vagaries of the new war-made rich". The people are an issue for several reviewers, The Atlantic was disappointed with the characters, calling them "puppets, pulled at times by too inadequate strings". The puppet theme continues as Hutchison refers to the characters as "marionettes", but his bigger issue stems from the disconnect to America he feels from Wharton and that these puppets are being "operated from a distance rather than persons actually at our side". The Atlantic then gives the verdict that there is a lack of "compelling naturalness in character and in situation". There is a fair amount of critique on the scenarios these characters are put in. America's review counts them as "fantastic", particularly with the people Pauline manages to throw together at her dinner parties. The finale of the novel is no exception. Wilson classified it this way: "when the catastrophe finally occurs, it is not quite dramatic enough".
