= Sorrell and Son (1934 film) =

- Theatrical release poster
- Directed by: Jack Raymond
- Written by: Lydia Hayward
- Based on: Sorrell and Son by Warwick Deeping
- Produced by: Herbert Wilcox
- Starring: H. B. Warner; Margot Grahame; Peter Penrose; Hugh Williams; Winifred Shotter
- Cinematography: Cyril Bristow
- Edited by: Michael Hankinson
- Music by: Roy Robertson
- Production company: British & Dominions Film Corporation
- Distributed by: United Artists
- Release date: 29 May 1934
- Running time: 84 minutes
- Country: United Kingdom
- Language: English

Sorrell and Son is a 1934 British drama film directed by Jack Raymond and starring H. B. Warner, Margot Grahame, Peter Penrose, Hugh Williams and Winifred Shotter. It was written by Lydia Hayward based on the 1925 novel of the same title by Warwick Deeping and produced by Herbert Wilcox at British and Dominion Elstree Studios. A silent version had previously been released in 1927, also starring Warner.

The film was released on 29 May 1934, by United Artists. It was actor Louis Hayward's final British film before relocating to America, where he had a successful acting career for many years.

== Synopsis ==
When Captain Sorrell returns home from the war, his wife Dora leaves him for another man. Despite considerable hardship, the captain devotes his life to bringing up his young son Kit, who becomes the object of his devotion. Eventually, the boy grows up to have a successful career as a doctor, and the captain lives long enough to see him happily married.

== Cast ==
- H. B. Warner as Captain Stephen Sorrell
- Margot Grahame as Mrs. Dora Sorrell
- Peter Penrose as Kit Sorrell as a child
- Hugh Williams as Kit Sorrell as an adult
- Winifred Shotter as Molly Pentreath
- Ruby Miller as Mrs. Palfrey
- Evelyn Roberts as Mr. Roland
- Donald Calthrop as Dr. Richard Orange
- Arthur Chesney as Mr. Porteous
- Wally Patch as Buck
- Hope Davy as Ethel
- Louis Hayward as Duncan

== Critical reception ==
The Daily Film Renter wrote: "Powerfully emotional, gripping, and intensely human. Outstanding for moving performance by H. B. Warner, with other principals playing up strongly to star. Beautifully mounted and handled with fine restraint. Exceptional in dramatic and emotional appeal, picture ranks as unqualified box-office for halls of all grades."

The New York Times wrote "Warwick Deeping's novel, Sorrell and Son, which was produced as a silent film about seven years ago, is now to be seen at the Mayfair in talking-picture form. It was made by the British and Dominions concern under the supervision of Herbert Wilcox. It gives a faithful transcription...but in an episodic fashion, which often causes the story to be somewhat abrupt in its development. H.B. Warner, who acted Captain Sorrell in the mute edition, again plays the rôle in the current offering; and if his acting is not always as restrained as one might wish, it is frequently affecting. And after all, the author himself piled on the agony, a fact which gives both Mr. Warner and Mr. Wilcox an excuse to overemphasize the depiction of the hardships and misfortunes of the ex-British officer. Although there were disappointing spots in the Brenon film, its continuity was infinitely better than the present work, and also the silent production had the advantage of many impressive glimpses of London, the upper reaches of the Thames and the English countryside. Admitting that Mr. Wilcox gives an occasional flash of a charming country town, there are not enough of such views...The tragic note in the end is touched upon with laudable reticence."

TV Guide noted "Warner is nearly perfect in his portrayal of the broken man who refuses to give in, although choppy editing hinders the overall effect."
