= Warwick Deeping =

English writer (1877–1950)

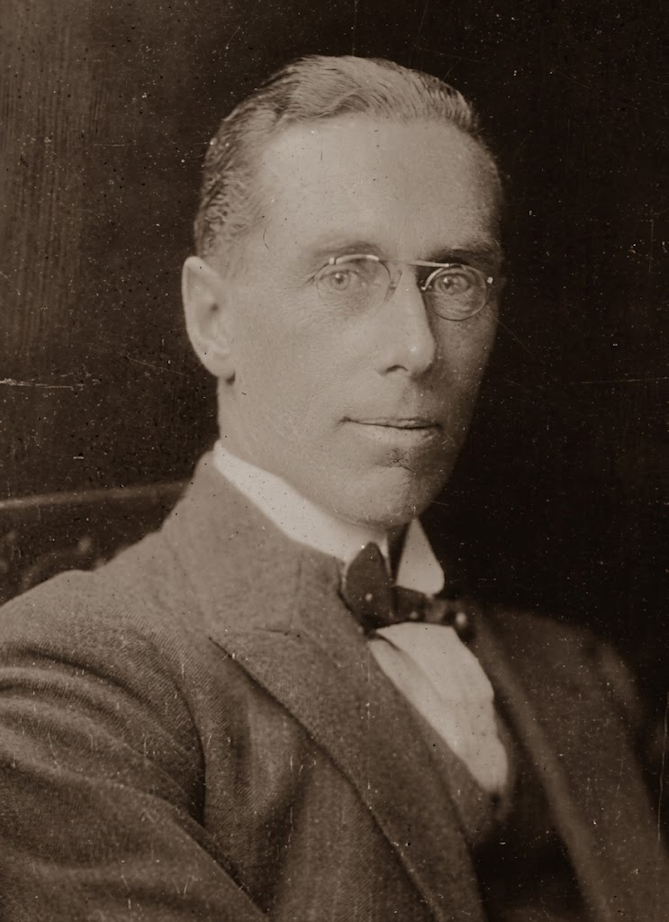
Portrait of Deeping, published around 1927

George Warwick Deeping (28 May 1877 – 20 April 1950) was an English novelist and short story writer, whose best-known novel was Sorrell and Son (1925).

== Life ==
Born in Southend-on-Sea, Essex, into a family of physicians, Warwick Deeping was educated at Merchant Taylors' School. He proceeded to Trinity College, Cambridge, to study medicine and science (receiving his MA in March 1902), then went to Middlesex Hospital to finish his medical training. During the First World War, he served in the Royal Army Medical Corps. Deeping later gave up his job as a physician to become a full-time writer. He married Phyllis Maude Merrill and lived for the rest of his life in "Eastlands" on Brooklands Road, Weybridge, Surrey.

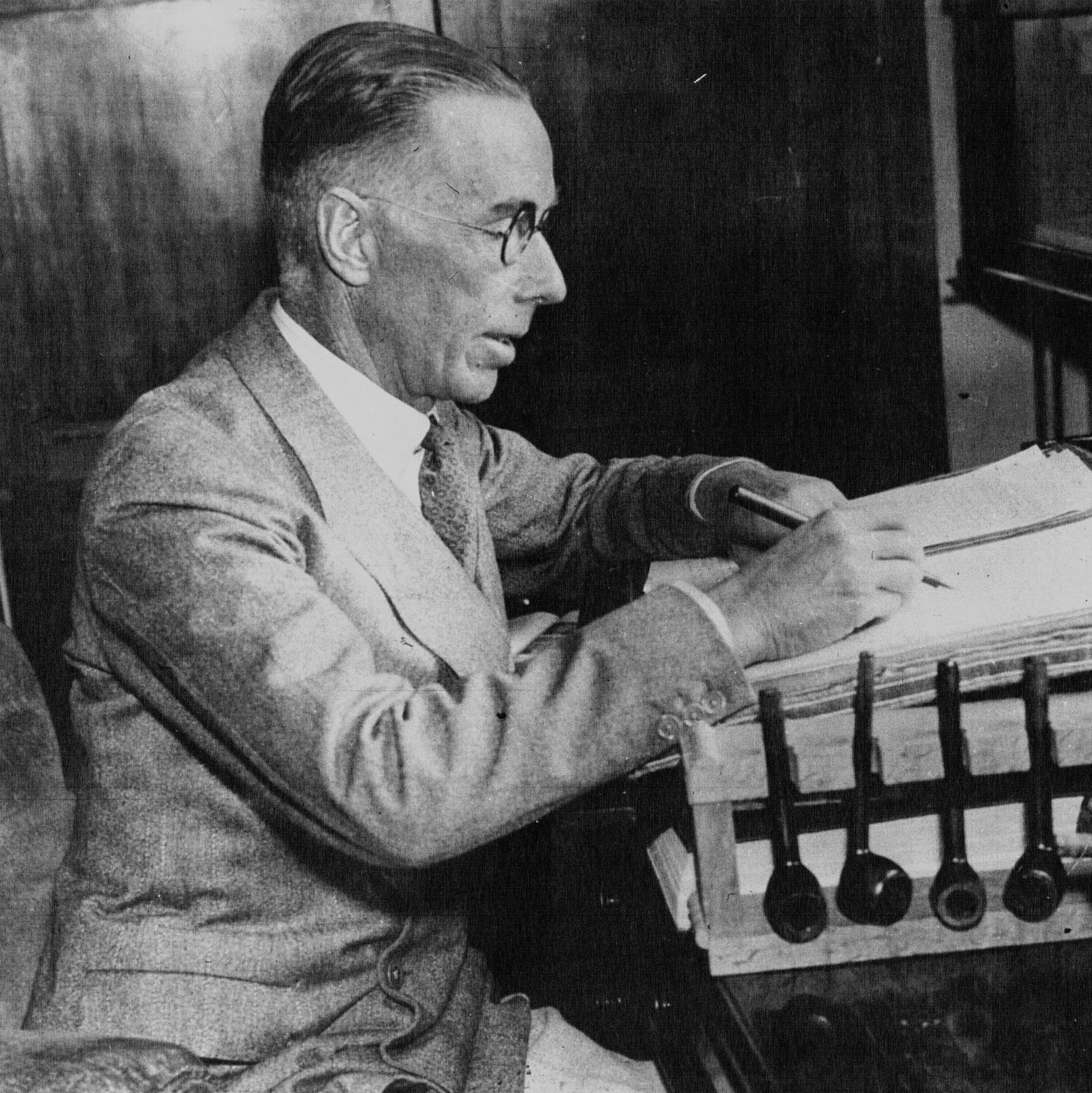
Warwick Deeping in 1932

He was one of the best-selling authors of the 1920s and 1930s, with seven of his novels making the best-seller list. Deeping was a prolific writer of short stories, which appeared in such British magazines as Cassell's, The Story-Teller, and The Strand. He also published fiction in several US magazines, including the Saturday Evening Post and Adventure. All of the short stories and serialised novels in US magazines were reprints of works previously published in Britain. Well over 200 of his original short stories and essays that appeared in various British fiction magazines were never seen in book form during his lifetime.

== Themes ==
Deeping's early work is dominated by historical romances. His later novels more usually dealt with modern life, and were critical of many tendencies of twentieth-century civilisation. His standpoint was generally that of a passionate individualism, distrustful both of ruling elites and of the lower classes, who were often presented as a threat to his embattled middle-class protagonists. His most celebrated hero is Captain Sorrell M.C., the ex-officer who after the First World War is reduced to a menial occupation in which he is bullied by those of a lower social class and less education.

Deeping's novels often deal with controversial issues. In her 2009 study The Ordeal of Warwick Deeping, Mary Grover lists these:

- social work and medicine in the slums (Roper's Row, 1929; The Impudence of Youth, 1946; Paradise Place, 1949.)
- gender ambiguity (The Return of the Petticoat, 1907)
- alcoholism (A Woman's War, 1907; The Woman at the Door, 1937; The Dark House, 1941)
- euthanasia (Sorrell and Son (1925); The Dark House, 1941)
- wife abuse and justifiable homicide (The Woman at the Door, 1937)
- shell shock (The Secret Sanctuary, 1923)
- rape (The White Gate, 1913)
- pollution of the water supply (Sincerity, 1912)

== Critical reception ==
Despite his use of controversial themes, Deeping received little recognition as a serious writer. In her influential 1932 book Fiction and the Reading Public, Q. D. Leavis described Warwick Deeping as a "middlebrow" writer. Leavis criticised Deeping and Gilbert Frankau as pretentious writers who worked to "debase the emotional currency by touching grossly on fine issues." Leavis also accused Deeping of anti-intellectualism. Noting several disparaging references to "highbrows" that appeared in Deeping's novels, Leavis wrote that Deeping's writings " exhibit a persistent hostility to the world of letters which is quite unprecedented." Graham Greene also criticized Deeping's work; in his 1936 book Journey Without Maps Greene includes Deeping's novels on a list of books "written without truth, without compulsion, one dull word following another." George Orwell, whose political beliefs were very different from Deeping's, dismissed Deeping in his 1940 essay "Inside the Whale" as being among the 'huge tribe' of writers who 'simply don't notice what is happening'. By contrast, Kingsley Amis gave some guarded praise for Deeping's work. Amis read Deeping's Sorrell and Son and initially disliked the book. However, in a later interview Amis praised Sorrell and Son, saying "Its sensibility was very crude but it delivered". Martin Seymour-Smith argued that the majority of Deeping's novels "have little literary merit." However, Seymour-Smith added "Sorrell and Son, however, does have some force behind its complacency - and is better written than the other sixty-odd books."

== Books ==
- Uther and Igraine (1903), his first published novel
- Love Among the Ruins (1904)
- The Slanderers (1904)
- The Seven Streams (1905)
- Bess of the Woods (1906)
- The Return of the Petticoat (1907)
- Bertrand of Brittany (1908)
- Mad Barbara, also known as These White Hands (1908) Historical novel set during the Stuart Restoration
- The Red Saint (1909) Historical novel about Henry III of England
- The Rust of Rome (1910)
- Fox Farm, also known as The Eyes of Love (1911)
- Joan of the Tower (1911)
- The Lame Englishman (1910)
- Sincerity, also known as The Challenge of Love, The Strong Hand (1912)
- The House of Spies (1913)
- The White Gate (1913)
- The Pride of Eve (1914)
- The Shield of Love, also known as King Behind The King (1914)
- Marriage by Conquest (1915)
- Unrest, also known as Bridge of Desire (1916)
- Martin Valliant (1917)
- Countess Glika (1919)
- Valour (1919)
- Second Youth, also known as The Awakening (1919)
- The Prophetic Marriage (1920)
- The House of Adventure (1921)
- Lantern Lane (1921)
- Orchards, also known as The Captive Wife(1922)
- Apples of Gold (1923)
- The Secret Sanctuary or The Saving of John Stretton (1923)
- Three Rooms (1924)
- Suvla John (1924)
- Sorrell and Son (1925)
- Doomsday (1927)
- Kitty (1927)
- Old Pybus (1928)
- Roper's Row (1929)
- Exile (1930)
- The Short Stories of Warwick Deeping, also known as Stories of Love, Courage, and Compassion (1930)
- The Bridge of Desire (1931)
- Second Youth, also known as The Awakening (1931)
- The Ten Commandments, also known as The Road (1931)
- Old Wine and New (1932)
- Smith (1932)
- Two Black Sheep (1933)
- The Eyes of Love (1933)
- "The Madness of Professor Pye" (1934)
- Seven Men Came Back (1934)
- The Man on the White Horse (1934)
- Two in a Train and Other Stories (1935)
- Sackcloth into Silk, also known as The Golden Cord (1935)
- No Hero—This (1936)
- Blind Man's Year (1937)
- The Malice of Men (1938)
- Fantasia, also known as Bluewater (1939)
- Shabby Summer, also known as Folly Island (1939)
- The Man Who Went Back (1940)
- The Dark House (1941)
- Corn in Egypt (1941)
- I Live Again (1942)
- Slade (1943)
- Mr Gurney and Mr Slade, also known as The Cleric's Secret (1944)
- The Impudence of Youth (1946)
- Reprieve (1945)
- Laughing House (1946)
- Portrait of a Playboy, also known as The Playboy (1947)
- Paradise Place (1949)
- Old Mischief (1950)

Published posthumously

- Time to Heal (1952)
- Man in Chains (1953)
- The Old World Dies (1954)
- Caroline Terrace (1955)
- The Serpent's Tooth (1956)
- The Sword and the Cross (1957)
- The Lost Stories of Warwick Deeping – Volumes I – IX (2013–2024) – A total of over 5000 pages, containing over 250 short stories, novellas, essays and 4 unpublished novels. These works were never published in book form and only appeared in British and American fiction magazines in the 1910s-1930s, such as The Story-Teller, The New Magazine, Cassell's Magazine of Fiction, and The Strand.

== Films ==
Movies based on Deeping's novels belong, with two exceptions, to the silent era. Unrest was filmed in 1920, Fox Farm in 1922, and Doomsday in 1928. Kitty (1929), directed by Victor Saville, was one of the first British talkies (only the second half of the film had a soundtrack).

Sorrell and Son (about an officer who after the First World War finds himself unemployable except in a menial capacity, but who is determined to give his son the best education possible) was filmed three times: It first appeared in 1927 as a silent movie, was remade in 1934 as a sound film, and turned into a TV mini-series in 1984.
