= Sorrell and Son (1927 film) =

1927 film

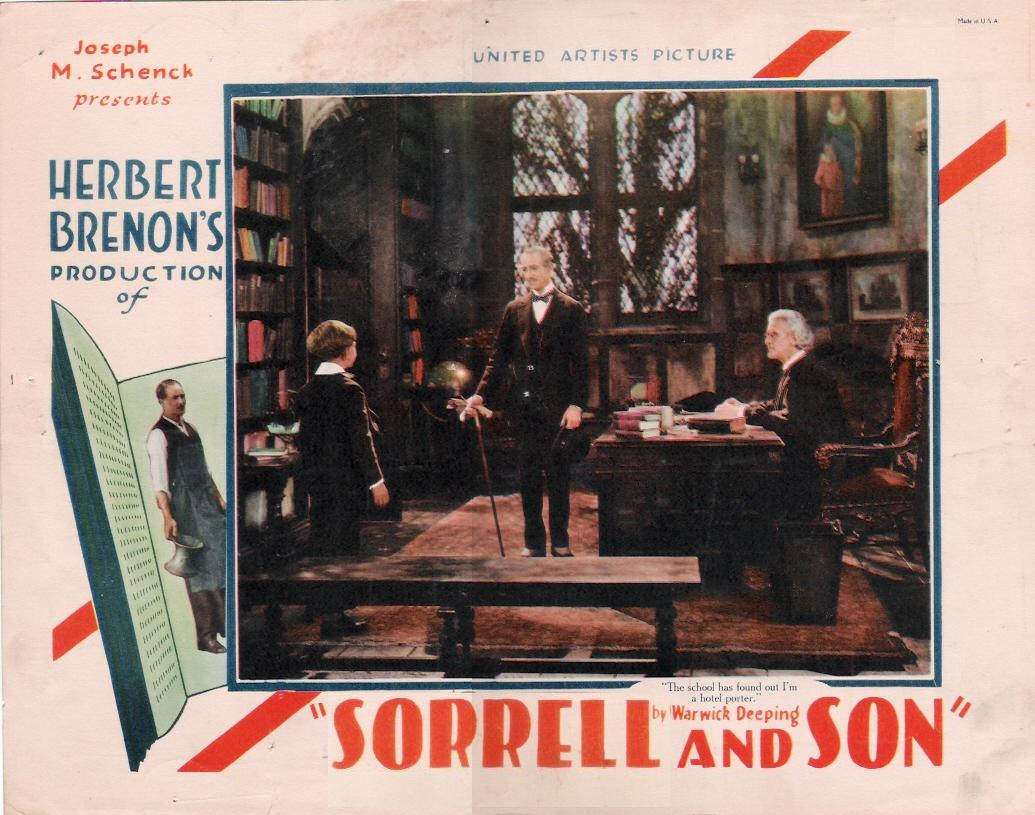
- Directed by: Herbert Brenon; Ray Lissner (assistant)
- Written by: Elizabeth Meehan (adaptation); Herbert Brenon (scenario)
- Based on: Sorrell and Son by Warwick Deeping
- Produced by: Joseph Schenck
- Starring: H. B. Warner; Anna Q. Nilsson; Norman Trevor; Nils Asther; Mary Nolan
- Cinematography: James Wong Howe
- Edited by: Marie Halvey
- Distributed by: United Artists
- Release dates: November 12, 1927 (New York City); December 2, 1927 (U.S.)
- Running time: 10 reels; 9,000 feet 100 minutes
- Country: United States
- Language: Silent (English intertitles)

Sorrell and Son is a 1927 American silent drama film released on December 2, 1927 and nominated for the Academy Award for Best Director at the 1st Academy Awards the following year. The film was based on the 1925 novel of the same name by Warwick Deeping, Sorrell and Son, which became and remained a bestseller throughout the 1920s and 1930s.

The screenplay was adapted by Elizabeth Meehan. It was written and directed by Herbert Brenon. Filming took place in England.

== Remake ==
The story has been remade twice, once in 1934 as Sorrell and Son, with H.B. Warner repeating his role as Stephen Sorrell, and once as a British television serial in 1984.

== Preservation status ==
The 1927 version was considered a lost film for many years. However, the Academy Film Archive restored both an almost-complete copy of Sorrell and Son and a trailer for the film, in 2004 and 2006, respectively.

== Cast ==
- H. B. Warner as Stephen Sorrell
- Anna Q. Nilsson as Dora Sorrell
- Mickey McBan as Kit (as a child)
- Carmel Myers as Flo Palfrey
- Lionel Belmore as John Palfrey
- Norman Trevor as Thomas Roland
- Betsy Ann Hisle as Molly (as a child)
- Louis Wolheim as Buck
- Paul McAllister as Dr. Orange
- Alice Joyce as Fanny Garland
- Nils Asther as Christopher 'Kit' Sorrell
- Mary Nolan as Molly Roland

== See also ==
- List of rediscovered films
