= Sorrell and Son (novel) =

1925 novel by Warwick Deeping

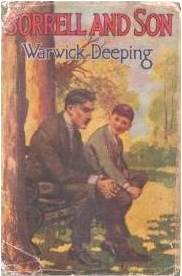
- First edition
- Author: Warwick Deeping
- Language: English
- Publisher: Cassell
- Publication date: 1925
- Publication place: United Kingdom
- Media type: Print

Sorrell and Son is a novel by the British writer Warwick Deeping, published in 1925. It became an international bestseller. The novel explores the theme of filial love and the effects of war on the same.

== Plot ==
When Captain Sorrel's wife leaves him, he takes upon himself to raise his son, Kit, by making sacrifices in terms of his career and life. He keeps his son under the impression that his mother is dead while he works hard as a hotel porter to provide for his son's medical education. At one point in the story, Kit's mother reenters their life, making it problematic for Sorrel to balance his lie with the facts that are emerging. In the end, Kit successfully becomes a doctor, and Sorrel's efforts pay off.

== Reception ==
Kingsley Amis saw the novel as an example of how the best-seller authors have psyches not less comparable to "their highbrow equivalents": "A rapturous wish-fulfilling dream of perfect filial love lies at the core of the book, involving absolute rejection of the mother and absolute devotion to the father, and hinting at a disturbance in the author of dimensions normally reserved for figures of pan-European stature."

== Adaptations ==
The novel has been adapted into two films:

- Sorrell and Son, a 1927 American silent film directed by Herbert Brenon
- Sorrell and Son, a 1934 British film directed by Jack Raymond

In 1984 a six-part television series Sorrell and Son was released.

== Bibliography ==
- David Ayers. English Literature of the 1920s. Edinburgh University Press, 2004.
