= A Lady of Quality =

A Lady of Quality may refer to:

- A Lady of Quality (novel), an 1896 novel by Frances Hodgson Burnett
- A Lady of Quality (play), a play based on the novel with Julia Arthur
- A Lady of Quality (1913 film), a silent film drama, based on the novel
- A Lady of Quality (1924 film), an American silent historical drama film, based on the novel

== See also ==
- Lady of Quality, a 1972 novel by Georgette Heyer
