= Hikaru Nishida discography =

- Studio albums: 12
- EPs: 1
- Live albums: 3
- Compilation albums: 4
- Singles: 25
- Video albums: 12 (Note: This includes the music video compilation albums and concert DVDs.)

The discography of the Japanese singer and actress Hikaru Nishida consists of twelve studio albums, four compilation albums, and twenty-five singles released since 1988.

== Albums ==
=== Studio albums ===
Year	Information	Oricon weekly peak position	Sales	RIAJ certification
1989	Clear: Released: June 21, 1989; Label: Pony Canyon; Formats: LP, CD, cassette	—		
1989	Silhouette: Released: December 21, 1989; Label: Pony Canyon; Formats: CD, cassette	90		
1990	Tokimeki no Prologue: Released: December 5, 1990; Label: Pony Canyon; Formats: CD, cassette	43		
1991	Esprit: Released: December 2, 1991; Label: Pony Canyon; Formats: CD, cassette	24		
1992	19 Dreams: Released: August 5, 1992; Label: Pony Canyon; Formats: CD, cassette	26		
1993	Sun Dance: Released: July 7, 1993; Label: Pony Canyon; Formats: CD, cassette	31		
1994	Love Always: Released: August 3, 1994; Label: Pony Canyon; Formats: CD, cassette	28		
1995	A File of Life: Released: September 6, 1995; Label: Pony Canyon; Formats: CD, cassette	36		
1996	24 Two-Four: Released: July 3, 1996; Label: Pony Canyon; Formats: CD, cassette	68		
1996	You'll Never Know: Released: December 11, 1996; Label: Pony Canyon; Formats: CD, cassette	—		
1998	Shiawase no Katachi: Released: September 2, 1998; Label: Pony Canyon; Formats: CD, cassette	—		
2002	Love for All Seasons: Released: May 22, 2002; Label: Pony Canyon; Formats: CD	—		
"—" denotes a release that did not chart.

=== Live albums ===
Year	Information	Oricon weekly peak position	Sales	RIAJ certification
1995	Sophisticated Yancha Lady: Hikaru Nishida 1995 Concert: Released: November 17, 1995; Label: Pony Canyon; Formats: CD, cassette	96		
1997	Live Two-Four: Hikaru Nishida Fall Concert 1996: Released: January 18, 1997; Label: Pony Canyon; Formats: CD, cassette	—		
1998	Hippie Happy Groove!! Hikaru Nishida Live '97: Released: March 4, 1998; Label: Pony Canyon; Formats: CD, cassette	—		
"—" denotes a release that did not chart.

=== Compilations ===
Year	Information	Oricon weekly peak position	Sales	RIAJ certification
1994	Very Best of Hikaru: Theme Song, CF Song Collection: Released: December 7, 1994; Label: Pony Canyon; Formats: CD, cassette	69		
2002	My Collection! Hikaru Nishida Best: Released: March 20, 2002; Label: Pony Canyon; Formats: CD	—		
2007	Hikaru Nishida Singles Complete: Released: August 17, 2007; Label: Pony Canyon; Formats: CD	—		
2010	My Colle! Lite: Released: April 21, 2010; Label: Pony Canyon; Formats: CD, digital	—		
"—" denotes a release that did not chart.

== Singles ==
=== Regular singles ===
List of singles, with selected chart positions
Title	Date	Peak chart positions	Sales (JPN)	RIAJ certification	Album
Title	Date	Oricon Singles Charts	Sales (JPN)	RIAJ certification	Album
"Fifteen"	April 6, 1988	40			Clear
"Nice-Catch!"	July 21, 1988	45			Clear
"Little Chance"	October 21, 1988	75			Clear
"Koi wa Shiroi T-shirt"	March 25, 1989	49			Non-album single
"Natural Summer Days"	July 5, 1989	52			Silhouette
"Namida no Pearl Moon"	October 21, 1989	57			Silhouette
"Pun Pun Pun"	April 4, 1990	29			Tokimeki no Prologue
"Te no Hira no Watashi"	August 1, 1990	20			Tokimeki no Prologue
"Oh My God!! Dane"	November 7, 1990	35			Tokimeki no Prologue
"Kokoro dake Soba ni Iru (Here in My Heart)"	March 21, 1991	25			Esprit
"Tokimeite"	August 7, 1991	7			Esprit
"Meguri Ai"	February 5, 1992	15			19 Dreams
"Ikiterutte Subarashī"	July 24, 1992	24			19 Dreams
"Kagayaki! Kudasai"	November 6, 1992	35			Sun Dance
"Namida Tomaranai"	May 12, 1993	18			Non-album single
"Kitto Ai ga Aru"	May 20, 1994	19			Love Always
"Jinsei Kaechau Natsu Kamo ne"	March 17, 1995	18			A File of Life
"C'mon³!"	August 2, 1995	24			A File of Life
"Go! Paradise"	June 21, 1995	20			Non-album single
"Watashi no No. 1 (You're the Only One)"	May 2, 1996	36			24 Two-Four
"Melody" (Duet with Kazuhiko Katō)	October 1, 1996	67			Non-album single
"Love Is Changing"	August 20, 1997	54			Non-album single
"Dan Dan Musume"	October 17, 1997	65			Non-album single
"Pure"	April 29, 1998	—			Shiawase no Katachi
"As Pure as..."	April 21, 1999	72			Non-album single
"Sorairo"	November 1, 2000	—			My Collection! Hikaru Nishida Best
"Egao no Tane"	May 31, 2013	—			Non-album single
"—" denotes releases that did not chart.

=== Other singles ===
List of singles, with selected chart positions
Title	Date	Peak chart positions	Sales (JPN)	RIAJ certification	Album
Title	Date	Oricon Singles Charts	Sales (JPN)	RIAJ certification	Album
"Bokura no Cedie"	January 21, 1988	—			Non-album single
"Lookin' for the Promised Land"	November 13, 1996	—			Non-album single
"—" denotes releases that did not chart.

== Videography ==
=== Music video albums ===
List of media, with selected chart positions
Title	Album details	Peak positions		Sales (Oricon)
Title	Album details	JPN DVD	JPN Blu-ray	Sales (Oricon)
P-Can Island	Released: October 5, 1988; Label: Pony Canyon; Formats: LD, VHS	—	—	N/A
Tenshi ni Aitai: Hikaru Nishida in Los Angeles	Released: February 1991; Label: Pony Canyon; Formats: LD, VHS	—	—	N/A
Nishida 1	Released: September 1996; Label: Pony Canyon; Formats: LD, VHS	—	—	N/A
Hikaru 2	Released: September 1996; Label: Pony Canyon; Formats: LD, VHS	—	—	N/A
25th Anniversary DVD: Are mo Kore mo PV Collection	Released: July 17, 2013; Label: Pony Canyon; Formats: DVD	237	—	N/A

=== Live video albums ===
List of media, with selected chart positions
Title	Album details	Peak positions		Sales (Oricon)
Title	Album details	JPN DVD	JPN Blu-ray	Sales (Oricon)
First Concert: Manatsu no Surprise	Released: October 1990; Label: Pony Canyon; Formats: LD, VHS	—	—	N/A
Hikaru Nishida 1991 Concert: Manatsu Jōzu	Released: October 1991; Label: Pony Canyon; Formats: LD, VHS	—	—	N/A
Hikaru Nishida 1992 Concert: Manatsu Jōzu Vol. 2 Lady	Released: October 1992; Label: Pony Canyon; Formats: LD, VHS	—	—	N/A
Hikaru Nishida 1994 Concert: Love Always ~Umi de Mitsuketa Tenshi~	Released: December 1994; Label: Pony Canyon; Formats: LD, VHS	—	—	N/A
Hikaru Nishida 1995 Concert: Sophisticated Yancha Lady	Released: November 1995; Label: Pony Canyon; Formats: LD, VHS	—	—	N/A
Hikaru Nishida Fall Concert 1996 Live Two-Four	Released: January 1997; Label: Pony Canyon; Formats: LD, VHS	—	—	N/A
'Hikaru Nishida Live '97: Hippie Happy Groove!!	Released: March 1998; Label: Pony Canyon; Formats: LD, VHS	—	—	N/A
