= Little Lord Fauntleroy (TV series) =

Japanese anime television series

- 小公子セディ
- Genre: Drama, family, historical
- Based on: Little Lord Fauntleroy by Frances Hodgson Burnett
- Screenplay by: Fumio Ishimori
- Directed by: Kōzō Kusuba
- Music by: Kōichi Morita
- Country of origin: Japan
- Original language: Japanese
- No. of episodes: 43

Production
- Executive producer: Koichi Motohashi
- Producers: Shigeo Endō; Junzō Nakajima (Nippon Animation); Jirō Komaki (Fuji TV)
- Production companies: Fuji Television; Nippon Animation

Original release
- Network: FNS (Fuji TV)
- Release: 10 January – 25 December 1988

Little Lord Fauntleroy, also known as Little Prince Cedie (小公子セディ, Shōkōshi Sedi), is a Japanese anime series produced by Nippon Animation in 1988 and was broadcast on the World Masterpiece Theater. The series is based on Frances Hodgson Burnett's 1886 book Little Lord Fauntleroy.

In the Philippines, the series aired on ABS-CBN in the early 1990s (with some reruns during the next decade or two) under the title of Cedie, Ang Munting Prinsipe, with the spin-off live-action film of the same title released in 1996 by Star Cinema. The film adaptation of Little Lord Fauntleroy starred former child actor Tom Taus Jr. as the eponymous character.

In the United Kingdom, the series premiered in the form of an English-dubbed version that aired on ITV between 1995 and 1998.

== Outline ==
The series is a home drama which depicts the process of a grumpy grandfather and the surroundings of a noble family moved by his grandson and becoming mild. Several animal characters also appear in the series.

The story is divided into two parts: part one takes place in New York and part 2 takes place in the United Kingdom.

== Plot ==
The story concerns an American boy named Cedric Errol (more fondly known as "Ceddie), who at an early age finds that he is the sole heir to a British earldom and leaves New York City to take up residence in his ancestral castle. After some initial resistance, he is joined by his middle-class mother (whom Cedie calls "Dearest"), widow of heir James Errol.

His grandfather, the Earl of Dorincourt, intends to teach the boy to become an aristocrat, but Cedie inadvertently teaches his grandfather compassion and social justice, and the artless simplicity and motherly love of Dearest warms the old man's heart.

== Characters ==
=== Main characters ===
- Cedric "Ceddie" Errol (voiced by Ai Orikasa): The main character of this anime, Cedric is an innocent and warm-hearted 7-year-old boy who likes baseball and is good at playing the flute.
- James Errol (voiced by Shinji Ogawa): The father of Cedie, he is kind and respected man. A reporter of a newspaper company, James was born in an earl family of the United Kingdom. He married a US citizen, Annie, despite his family's opposition, and was estranged from his family as a result. Due to fatigue from over work, he died of a heart attack at the age of 32 at the end of episode 5.
- Annie Errol (Mrs. Errol) (voiced by Tomoko Munakata): The mother of Cedie, Annie is pretty, young, and kind-hearted woman.
- Earl Dorincourt (voiced by Takeshi Watabe): The grandfather of Cedie, Earl is a grumpy, bitter, and selfish old man at first. He eventually leared to love Cedie and, in the process, accept Annie as his late son's husband and the mother of his grandson.

=== Part 1: New York ===
- Alec (voiced by Yuzuru Fujimoto): The stubborn chief editor of the Morning Journal where James is on work.
- Silas Hobbes (voiced by Hiroyuki Shibamoto): An aged man who runs a greengrocer who initially despises aristocrats. He is also one of Cedie's closest adult friends in the neighborhood alongside Dick.
- Dick Tipton (voiced by Yuzuru Fujimoto): A bootblack who is one of Cedie's closest adult friends in the neighbourhood outside of Mr. Hobbes. He treats Cedie as a younger brother. He, together with Mr. Hobbes, help clear Cedie's name when the latter had issues with his legitimacy as the Earl of Doringcourt.
- Ms. Eliza (voiced by Miharu Yokota): A teacher at the school Ceddie attends.
- Eric (voiced by Kazue Ikura): A "best friend" and classmate of Ceddie.
- Mickey (voiced by Yūko Mita): A friend and classmate of Ceddie.
- Roy (voiced by Minami Takayama): A friend and classmate of Ceddie.
- Catherine (voiced by Rei Sakuma): A friend and classmate of Ceddie.
- Sara (voiced by Rihoko Yoshida): Catherine's mother.

=== Part 2: United Kingdom ===
- Mrs. Lesley Melon (voiced by Shō Saitō): The chief maid of the Dorincourt family, who cares for Ceddie.
- Jane Short (voiced by Eiko Yamada): A maid of Cedie, who becomes one of his close friends.
- Wilkins (voiced by Bin Shimada): The keeper of the territory of Earl Drincourt and the keeper of the stables.
- Cocky/Colleen (voiced by Mitsuko Horie): A precocious 5-year-old girl who became Ceddie's best friend. Orphaned from both parents, she was raised under her grandmother that lives in Court Lodge near the Dorincourt family. Mrs. Errol also lives there at some Point.
- Brigette (voiced by Naoko Matsui): Cedie's distant cousin. Initially she despised Cedie, but by an incident caused by her, she reconciled with Cedie.
- Harris (voiced by Yoshiko Sakakibara): The mother of Bridget and is malicious against Cedie.
- Guard: An unnamed member of the palace guards who protects the queen and freezes, Cedric just called him a doll, and he also doesn't speak.
- Mr. Jefferson (voiced by Kōichi Kitamura): The butler of the Dorincourt castle, and who constantly looks after the Earl which always annoyes him.
- Kathy/Katy (voiced by Miyako Shima): Cocky/Coline's grandmother.
- Peter (voiced by Teiyū Ichiryūsai): A boy a little older than Ceddie that works in the fields that befriends him.

=== Animal characters ===
- Dougal: Cedie's pet dog, and a dog of the Dorincourt family.
- Little Prince: A white horse presented for Cedie.
- Searim: Earl Dorincourt's horse.
- Lyla: Cocky's pet cat.

== Staff ==
- Director: Kōzō Kusuba
- Scenario: Fumio Ishimori
- Character design: Michiyo Sakurai
- Music: Kōichi Morita
- Sound director: Etsuji Yamada
- Animation director: Michiyo Sakurai, Hideaki Shimada, Hidemi Maeda, Megumi Kagawa, Toshiki Yamazaki, Hisatoshi Motoki, Yūko Fujii
- Art director: Nobuaki Numai
- Producer: Shigeo Endō, Junzō Nakajima (Nippon Animation), Jirō Komaki (Fuji Television)
- Planning: Shōji Satō (Nippon Animation), Taihei Ishikawa (Fuji Television)
- Production management: Mitsuru Takakuwa, Junzō Nakajima (Nippon Animation)
- Production desk: Shun'ichi Kosao (Nippon Animation)

== Theme songs ==
- Opening theme: Our Cedie (ぼくらのセディ, Bokura no Sedi)
  - Song by: Hikaru Nishida
  - Lyrics by: Michio Yamagami
  - Composition by: Kōichi Morita
  - Arrangement by: Kazuo Ōtani
- Ending theme: For Loving Someone (誰かを愛するために, Dare ka o Aisuru Tameni)
  - Song by: Hikaru Nishida
  - Lyrics by: Michio Yamagami
  - Composition by: Kōichi Morita
  - Arrangement by: Kazuo Ōtani
- Insert song: You Are My Friend (きみは友だち, Kimi wa Tomodachi)
  - Song by: Ai Orikasa
  - Lyrics by: Akira Itō
  - Composition by: Kōichi Morita
  - Arrangement by: Kazuo Ōtani

Hikaru Nishida, who sang the opening and ending themes of the series, was not part of the voice cast, but she did play Cedie in the musical adaptation.

== Trivia ==
- Shōkōshi Cedie was a runaway hit in the Philippines, as was Hodgson-Burnett's other anime-adapted work, Princess Sarah. Both series were adapted into feature-length, live-action films by Star Cinema. The film adaptation of Little Lord Fauntleroy stars former child actor Tom Taus Jr. as the eponymous character.
- A video game based on the series was made for the Nintendo Family Computer and was released in December 1988.
- In one episode, Cedie is seen reading a National Geographic magazine that features British aristocrats.

== Legacy ==
Ai Orikasa, who made her voice acting debut with the series, said as follows on Twitter:

緒方賢一さんと子供ミュージカルの舞台で出会ってなければ、声優のお仕事をしていなかった‥『小公子セディ』主役デビューなんてラッキーなことも‥振り返ると人々の作って下さった流れに乗っかっての今である。その是非は問わずに前に進もう！若人のエネルギーで今また一つ支流が生まれそう^.^ ("If I hadn't met Kenichi Ogata on the stage of a children's musical, I wouldn't have worked as a voice actor.. I'm lucky to make my debut as the leading role in "Little Prince Cedie".. Looking back, I'm on the flow that people made. Let's move forward regardless of whether we like it or not! With the energy of young people, another tributary is likely to be born now^.^")

In other words, she is happy that she got her voice acting start on the series due to having a happy experience of being part of the voice cast.

== See also ==
- Romeo and the Black Brothers, another anime series that had Orikasa in a main voice acting role and Kōzō Kusuba as the director
- Moero! Top Striker, an anime series that had Orikasa and Ikura in main voice roles, a dog character appearing and harsh characters gradually becoming milder, showing similarities to the Little Lord Fauntleroy series
