= Cedie =

- Official movie poster
- Directed by: Romy Suzara
- Screenplay by: Mari L. Mariano
- Story by: Shiro Ishimori
- Based on: Little Lord Fauntleroy by Fumio Ishimori; Little Lord Fauntleroy by Frances Hodgson Burnett
- Produced by: Charo Santos-Concio; Lily Monteverde
- Starring: Tom Taus Jr.
- Cinematography: Joe Batac
- Edited by: Joyce Bernal
- Music by: Nonong Buencamino
- Distributed by: Star Cinema
- Release date: May 8, 1996
- Running time: 115 minutes
- Country: Philippines
- Languages: Tagalog; English

Cedie, also known as Cedie: Ang Munting Prinsipe (lit. 'Cedie: The Little Prince'), is a 1996 Filipino family film loosely based on the popular anime Little Lord Fauntleroy which was in turn based on the 1886 children's novel of the same name by English playwright and author Frances Hodgson Burnett. The film was directed by Romy V. Suzara who also directed the film adaptation of Princess Sarah. The film starred Tom Taus Jr. as Cedric Erol.

In 2017, the film was digitally remastered by ABS-CBN's Film Restoration project.

== Plot ==
The story concerns an American boy named Cedie Erol, who at an early age finds that he is the sole heir to a British earldom and leaves New York City to take up residence in his ancestral castle, where, after some initial resistance, he is joined by his middle-class mother, the widow of the late heir. His grandfather, the Earl of Dorincourt, intends to teach the boy to become an aristocrat, but Cedie inadvertently teaches his grandfather compassion and social justice and the artless simplicity and motherly love of Dearest warms his heart.

== Cast and characters ==
- Tom Taus Jr. as Cedie Errol / Cedric James Errol
- Ronaldo Valdez as the Earl Errol of Dorincourt
- Jaclyn Jose as Annie Errol
- Mark Gil as Captain James Cedric Errol
- Noel Trinidad as Mr. Jefferson
- Subas Herrero as Mr. Hobbs
- Anita Linda as Mrs. Lesley Melon
- Thou Reyes as Eric
- Carlo Aquino as Ray
- Tita de Villa as Mrs. Taylor
- Shiela Ysrael as Mina
- Bon Vibar as Mr. Habisham
- Chuckie Dreyfus as Dick
- Korinne Lirio as Lady Brigette
- Melisse Santiago as Coleen
- Susan Lozada as Jane
- Menggie Cobarubbias as Newick
- Sara Polverini as Catherine
- Thelma Crisologo as Lady Claudette

=== Supporting roles ===
- Joseph McCarthy as Peter
- Mila Ferrer as Elizabeth
- Kenneth Cole as Mr Higgins
- Penny Miller as Mrs. Higgins
- Jose Javier de Silva as Wilkins
- Clint Fadera as Mickey
- Cris Soulios as Hartel
- Eugene Christensen as Ben
- Louie de Moral as Tom
- Michael Cruz as the bully boy
- Arsenio Ventosa as Alex
- Ria Salvador as Kim
- Eduardo Aquino as Dr. Gaston
- Francisco da Silva as the Priest in Brooklyn

== Production ==
The live action film was produced due to the success of the anime Little Lord Fauntleroy, known as Cedie, Ang Munting Prinsipe in the Philippines. Most of the film was shot on location in Spain, with other scenes shot on set in Baguio and Manila, Philippines.

== Accolades ==
- Nominated Best Child Actor for Tom Taus at the 1997 FAMAS Awards.
