= Hikaru Nishida =

Japanese pop singer and actress (born 1972)

- 西田 ひかる
- Born: Hikaru Nishida; August 16, 1972 (age 54); Fujisawa, Kanagawa, Japan
- Occupations: Singer; actress
- Agent: Manase Productions
- Height: 164 cm (5 ft 5 in)
- Spouse: Shigeki Ebi (m. 2002)
- Children: 2
- Musical career
- Genres: J-pop; dance-pop; kayōkyoku
- Instrument: Vocals
- Years active: 1988–present
- Label: Pony Canyon

Japanese name
- Kanji: 西田 ひかる
- Hiragana: にしだ ひかる
- Katakana: ニシダ ヒカル
Transcriptions
- Romanization: Nishida Hikaru
- Website: www.manasepro.co.jp/hikaru/

Hikaru Nishida (西田 ひかる, Nishida Hikaru; born August 16, 1972) is a Japanese pop singer and actress. She was born in Fujisawa, Kanagawa Prefecture, Japan, and made her singing debut on April 6, 1988 with the release of the single "Fifteen", named after her age at the time. Nishida is affiliated with Manase Productions.

== Biography ==
=== Early life and education ===
Hikaru Nishida moved to Los Angeles, California with her family in 1973 when her father was transferred there by his electrical equipment firm. There, she attended Clairbourn School in San Gabriel. Nishida visited Fujisawa during her summer and winter vacations. In 1979, she participated in a chorus with other children in Stevie Wonder's song "Ai no, Sono" on his album Stevie Wonder's Journey Through "The Secret Life of Plants".

In 1985, Nishida's family moved back to Japan, where she attended the American School in Japan until her graduation in 1990. She then attended Sophia University and graduated in 1994, with a major in comparative history of Japan and China.

Because of her residency in the U.S., Nishida is fluent in English. She has some trouble understanding Japanese poetry due to her time away from Japan. Nishida enjoys writing poetry, basket weaving, learning Spanish and the flute.

=== Entertainment career ===
In 1988, Nishida made her entertainment debut when she was appointed as a campaign girl for Japan Air System. She also starred in the stage musical production of Little Lord Fauntleroy that year and recorded the opening theme of the anime TV adaptation Little Prince Cedie. On April 6, Nishida released her debut single "Fifteen".

In 1991, Nishida made her debut on NHK's Kōhaku Uta Gassen, performing her single "Tokimeite".

Nishida hosted the 2002 FIFA World Cup Preliminary Draw gala on at the Tokyo International Forum and served as an ambassador in the Nagano Olympic Peace Appeal program.

== Personal life ==
In May 2002, Nishida married Shigeki Ebi, director of Fuji Electronic Industries. She gave birth to her first son in California in 2006 and her second son in 2009. Since 2006, Nishida has lived in Nishinomiya, Hyōgo. She was the first tourism ambassador for Nishinomiya from August 2011 to the end of March 2013.

== Discography ==
- Clear (1989)
- Silhouette (1989)
- Tokimeki no Prologue (1990)
- Esprit (1991)
- 19 Dreams (1992)
- Sun Dance (1993)
- Love Always (1994)
- A File of Life (1995)
- 24 Two-Four (1996)
- You'll Never Know (1996)
- Shiawase no Katachi (1998)
- Love for All Seasons (2002)

== Filmography ==
=== TV ===
==== Kōhaku Uta Gassen appearances ====
Year / Broadcast	Appearance	Song	Appearance order	Opponent	Notes
1991 (Heisei 3) / 42nd	Debut	"Tokimeite"	1/28	Bubblegum Brothers	
1992 (Heisei 4) / 43rd	2	"Ikiterutte Subarashī"	14/28	Masayuki Suzuki	Also performed a cover of "Candy Candy" with Chisato Moritaka and Miho Nakayama.
1993 (Heisei 5) / 44th	3	"Namida Tomaranai"	2/26	SMAP	Also performed a cover of "Moonlight Densetsu" with Fuyumi Sakamoto and Hiroko Moriguchi in a special segment.
1998 (Heisei 10) / 49th	4	"That's Disney Fantasy" (Medley)	5/25	Yutaka Yamakawa	

== Bibliography ==
=== Books ===
1. 5 December 1992: HUG
2. 20 September 1993: HUG II

=== Picture books ===
1. 20 September 1988: P-Can Island
2. 25 February 1990: Hi-Tide (ISBN 4-8470-2131-2) ¥1550
3. 1 April 1991: In Your Dreams (ISBN 4-8470-2183-5) ¥1950
4. 26 October 1992: 19 Dreams (ISBN 4-06-325401-1) ¥2800
5. 16 August 1994: Making of H.N. (ISBN 4-8470-2369-2) ¥4800. Mini-Photobook/Postcard/Video Set
