= Gretchen Gerzina =

American historian (born 1950)

- Born: 1950 (age 74–75); Ann Arbor, Michigan, U.S.
- Other names: Gretchen Holbrook Gerzina
- Occupation(s): Historian, author, academic
- Notable work: Black England: Life Before Emancipation
- Spouse: Anthony Gerzina
- Children: 2
- Website: gretchengerzina.com

Gretchen Holbrook Gerzina (born 1950) is an American author and academic who has written mostly historically-grounded biographical studies. She has written about Black British history. Her academic posts have included being the Kathe Tappe Vernon Professor of Biography at Dartmouth College, working as a professor at Vassar College, being a professor and a director of Africana Studies at Barnard College, and as of April 2019 being the Dean of the University of Massachusetts Amherst Commonwealth Honors College. Gerzina was the host of WAMC's nationally-syndicated radio program The Book Show for fourteen years, where she interviewed authors.

In the UK, she presented a 10-part documentary for BBC Radio 4 called Britain's Black Past, which she subsequently adapted into a book.

== Personal life ==
She was born in Ann Arbor, Michigan, and moved to Springfield, Massachusetts, just before she was five years old. She is married to Anthony Gerzina and they have two sons.

== Selected publications ==
- 1989: Carrington: A Life
- 1995: Black England: Life Before Emancipation. (Also known as Black London: Life Before Emancipation)
- 2004: Frances Hodgson Burnett: The unexpected life of the author of The Secret Garden
- 2008: Mr. and Mrs. Prince: How an Extraordinary 18th-Century Family Moved out of Slavery and into Legend
