= Stephen Townesend (surgeon) =

English surgeon and writer

Stephen Townesend FRCS
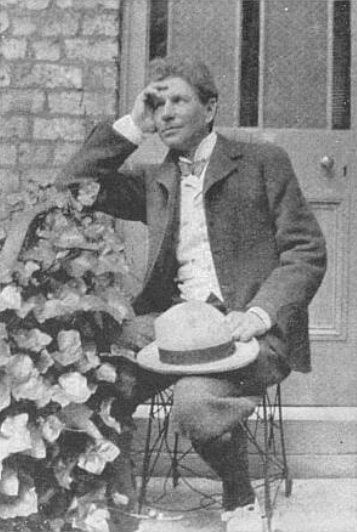
- Townesend in 1899
- Born: 1860; London, England
- Died: May 1914 (aged 53–54); Colney Heath, England
- Occupations: Surgeon, actor, activist, writer
- Spouse: Frances Hodgson Burnett (m. 1900; div. 1902)

Stephen Chapman Townesend (Note: His second name has also been cited as Townsend) FRCS (1860 – May 1914) was an English surgeon, stage actor, writer and anti-vivisectionist.

== Biography ==
Stephen Chapman Townesend was the son of a rector in London. He was educated at St Bartholomew's Hospital and the University of Edinburgh. He qualified M.R.C.S. in 1883 and F.R.C.S. in 1887. He was surgeon on the Orient Steamship Company's line, house surgeon at St Mark's Hospital and at Birmingham General Hospital. Townesend was a stage actor under the name Will Dennis and assisted the Amateur Dramatic Society of St Bartholomew's Hospital.

In 1900, he married Frances Hodgson Burnett in Genoa. He was involved with the stage adaptations of her novels. They divorced two years later. Townesend was an anti-vivisectionist, who was described as loving animals more than people.

Townesend died in Colney Heath from pneumonia in May 1914.

== Selected publications ==
- A Thorough-Bred Mongrel: The Tale of a Dog, Told by a Dog to Lovers of Dogs (1900)
- Dr. Tuppy (1912)
