= Kathryn Kidder =

American actress

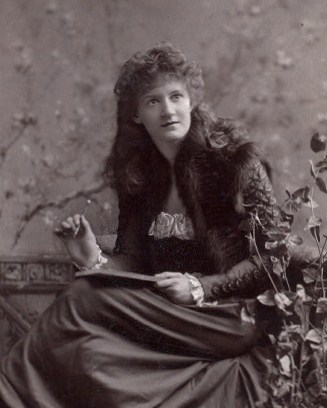
- Born: 1868; Newark, New Jersey
- Died: September 7, 1939; New York City, New York
- Other names: Mrs. L. K. Anspacher
- Occupation: Stage actress
- Spouse: Louis K. Anspacher

Kathryn Kidder (Mrs. L. K. Anspacher) (1868 – September 7, 1939) was an American actress.

Born at Newark, N. J., the daughter of Henry Martyn Kidder and Sarah Ravenhill, she studied dramatic art in New York, London, and Paris, made her début as an actress in Chicago in 1886, and later appeared in Davy Crockett, Nordeck, and Little Lord Fauntleroy.

After 1894 she starred continuously in old English comedies, in Shakespearean tragedies, and in French dramas. Her earliest success was in Sardou's Madame Sans-Géne, of which she obtained exclusive performing rights in the United States and Canada, in any language except French. She also played in Molly Pitcher (1902); Salammbô (1904); The Embarrassment of Riches (1906); A Woman of Impulse (1909); The Glass House (1911); The Washerwoman Duchess (1912), a version of Madame Sans-Géne.

Kathryn married Louis Kaufman Anspacher in 1905.
