= A Lady of Quality (1913 film) =

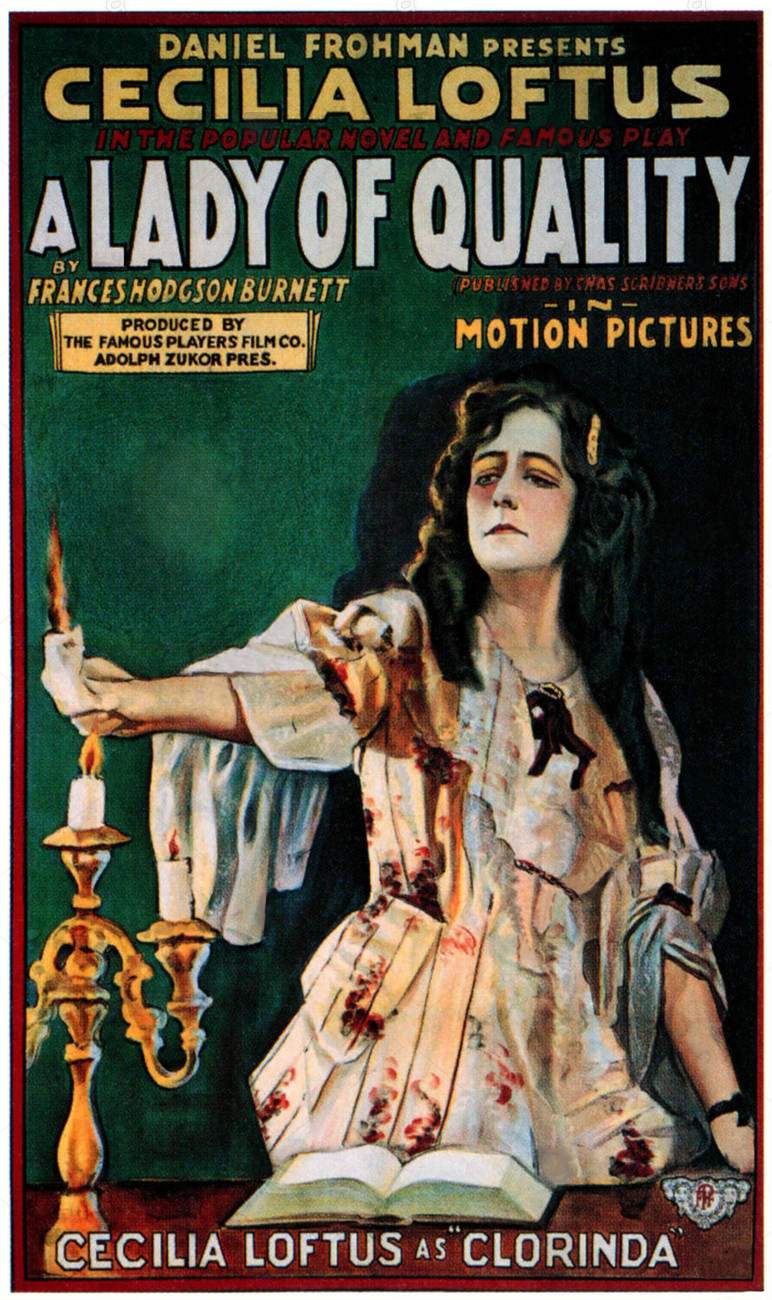
- Film poster
- Directed by: J. Searle Dawley
- Written by: J. Searle Dawley
- Based on: novel and play A Lady of Quality by Frances Hodgson Burnett c.1896
- Produced by: Daniel Frohman; Adolph Zukor
- Starring: Cecilia Loftus
- Distributed by: State's Rights
- Release date: December 27, 1913
- Running time: 5 reels
- Country: USA
- Language: Silent...English intertitles

A Lady of Quality is a lost 1913 silent film drama directed by J. Searle Dawley and starring stage actress Cissy Loftus. The film was produced by Daniel Frohman and Adolph Zukor, and it is based on the 1896 novel A Lady of Quality by Frances Hodgson Burnett. It was among the first of Zukor's feature-length productions.

== Cast ==
- Cecilia Loftus - Clorinda Wildairs
- House Peters - The Duke of Osmonde
- Peter Lang - Sir Jeoffrey Wildairs
- Hal Clarendon - Sir John Oxen
- Geraldine O'Brien - Sister Anne
- Roy Pilcher - Earl of Dunstandwolde (*as Roy Pilser)
- David Wall - Lord Eldershawe (*as Dave Wall)
- Alexander Gaden - Lord Twemlow
- Henrietta Goodman - Peasant Girl
- Edna May Weick - Clorinda, age 7 (*as Edna Weick)

== See also ==
- List of Paramount Pictures films
- A Lady of Quality (1924)
