= Cecilia Loftus =

British actress (1876–1943)

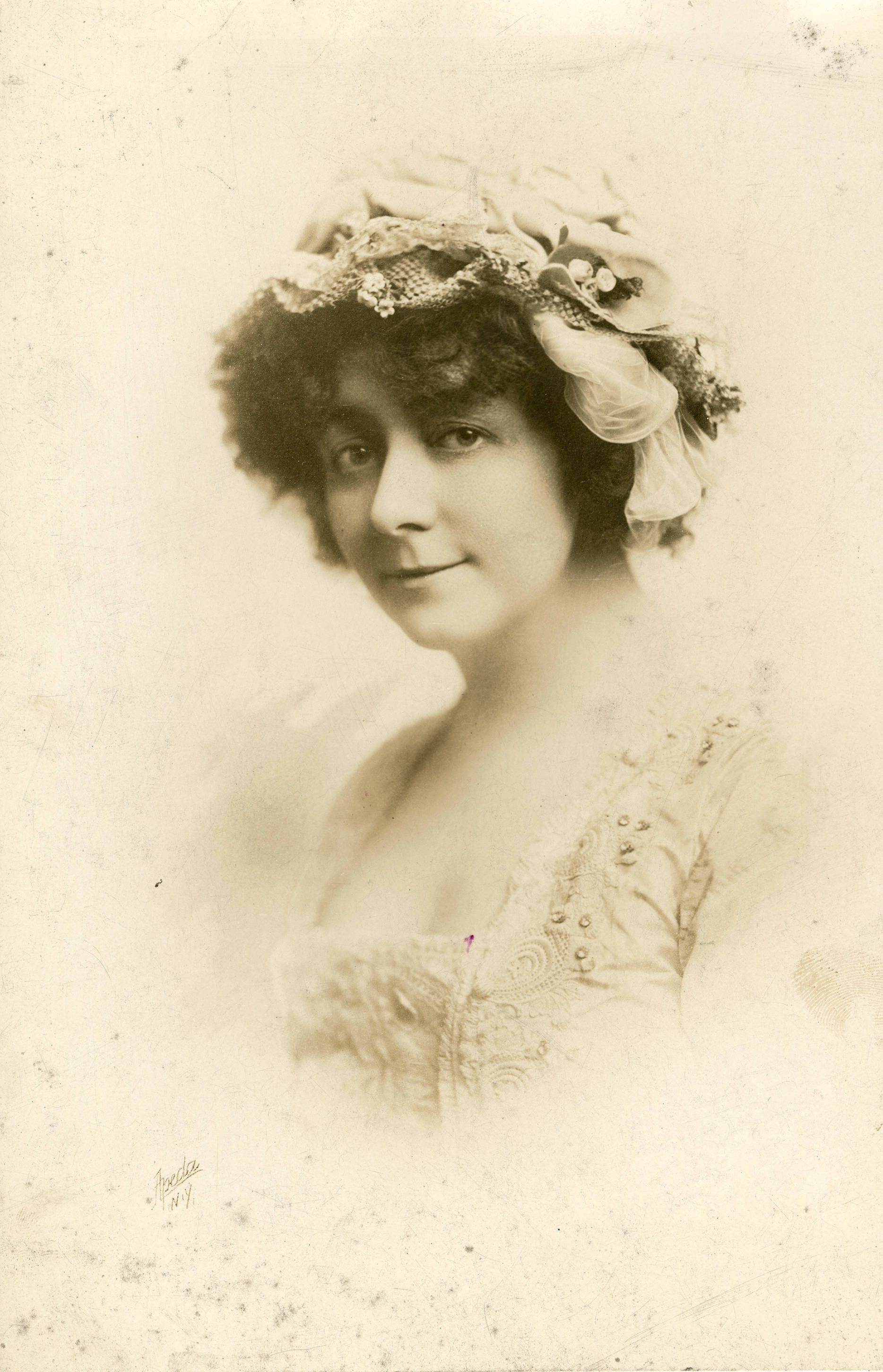
- Loftus circa 1913
- Born: Marie Cecilia Loftus Brown; October 22, 1876; Glasgow, Scotland
- Died: July 12, 1943 (aged 66); New York City, U.S.
- Other names: Cissie; Cissy
- Occupations: Actress; singer; vaudevillian; music hall performer
- Years active: 1893–1941
- Spouse: Justin Huntly McCarthy (m. 1893; div. 1899) Alonzo Higbee Waterman (m. 1908; div. 1920)
- Children: 1

Cecilia Loftus (born Marie Cecilia Loftus Brown; 22 October 1876 – 12 July 1943) was a Scottish actress, vaudevillian, and music hall performer in the late 19th and early 20th centuries. She was known professionally as Cissie Loftus or Cissy Loftus.

== Early life ==
Loftus was born in Glasgow, Scotland. Her father, Ben Brown, was part of the successful variety group, Brown, Newland & Le Clerc. Her mother, Marie Loftus, was 18 years old when Cecilia was born. An actress, pantomimic, and music hall performer, Marie later became a star of burlesque, billed as "The Sarah Bernhardt of the Halls".

Daughter Cecilia was given an education at the Convent of the Holy Child, Raikes Parade, Blackpool, England which moved in 1890 to the premises at Layton Hill Convent, Blackpool which it still occupies although now, after various name changes, splits and mergers, it is known as St. Mary's Catholic College. In July 1893, 17-year-old Cissy Loftus made her début at the Oxford Music Hall in London, followed by an appearance at the Palace Theatre of Varieties. After an early career in music hall and variety performing impersonations of well-known actresses of the day, such as Yvette Guilbert, she appeared at the Gaiety Theatre in musical comedy for one season.

== Theatre ==
In 1894, she appeared in vaudeville at the Lyceum Theatre in New York City. Loftus toured with the Ada Rehan Company and the Augustin Daly Company before she first appeared at Koster & Bial's on 21 January 1895. With the Rehan troupe she played Washington, DC, St. Louis, Missouri, and Chicago, Illinois as "Miss Cecile" in a playbill. Her exit from Daly's organisation occurred after Loftus was offered larger salaries in New York City. Other roles she played prior to 1895 were "Winnie" in The Last Word and "Audrey" in Love's Labour's Lost. Critics did not speak kindly of her work in these parts, to her dismay. Loftus became an international favourite in vaudeville along with Vesta Tilley and Harry Lauder.

She then began to appear in the legitimate theatre, appearing in The Children of the King at the Royal Court Theatre, in 1898. The following year she returned to the United States to tour in vaudeville and was seen by Sir Henry Irving in 1901 at the Knickerbocker Theatre. He was so impressed that he engaged her to appear with him in the roles that Dame Ellen Terry could no longer play. She later toured with Irving, although the earnings were not as great as those on the music hall circuit.

In 1905, she successfully essayed the very serious role of Nora in Henrik Ibsen's A Doll's House. Later that year she played Peter Pan to considerable acclaim in the second British production of Barrie's play. The next year she toured with The Diamond Express and appeared at the Royal Variety Performance at the Palace Theatre in 1912. In 1914, Loftus played the part of Desdemona in Othello at the Lyric Theatre (New York).

== Burlesque, Broadway, and lyricist ==
She had a successful career both in burlesque, as an accomplished mimic, and on Broadway. Some of the productions she appeared in are The Man of Forty (1900), If I Were King (1901) by her husband Justin Huntly McCarthy, Hamlet (1903) with E.H. Sothern, the Victor Herbert operetta Dream City (1906), Venus (1927) with Tyrone Power, Sr., Three-Cornered Moon (1933) with Ruth Gordon, Clare Boothe Luce's Abide With Me (1935), and Little Dark Horse (1941). As Cissie Loftus, she wrote lyrics and music for songs in a number of productions, including The Belle of Bridgeport (1900) and The Lancers (1907).

== Films ==
Loftus also appeared in cinema from the 1910s to the 1940s, with roles that included Clorinda Widairs in A Lady of Quality (1913), Mrs. Sinclair in Young Sinners (1931), Grandmother Lovell in The Old Maid (1939), and Granny Tyl in The Blue Bird (1940).

== Personal life ==
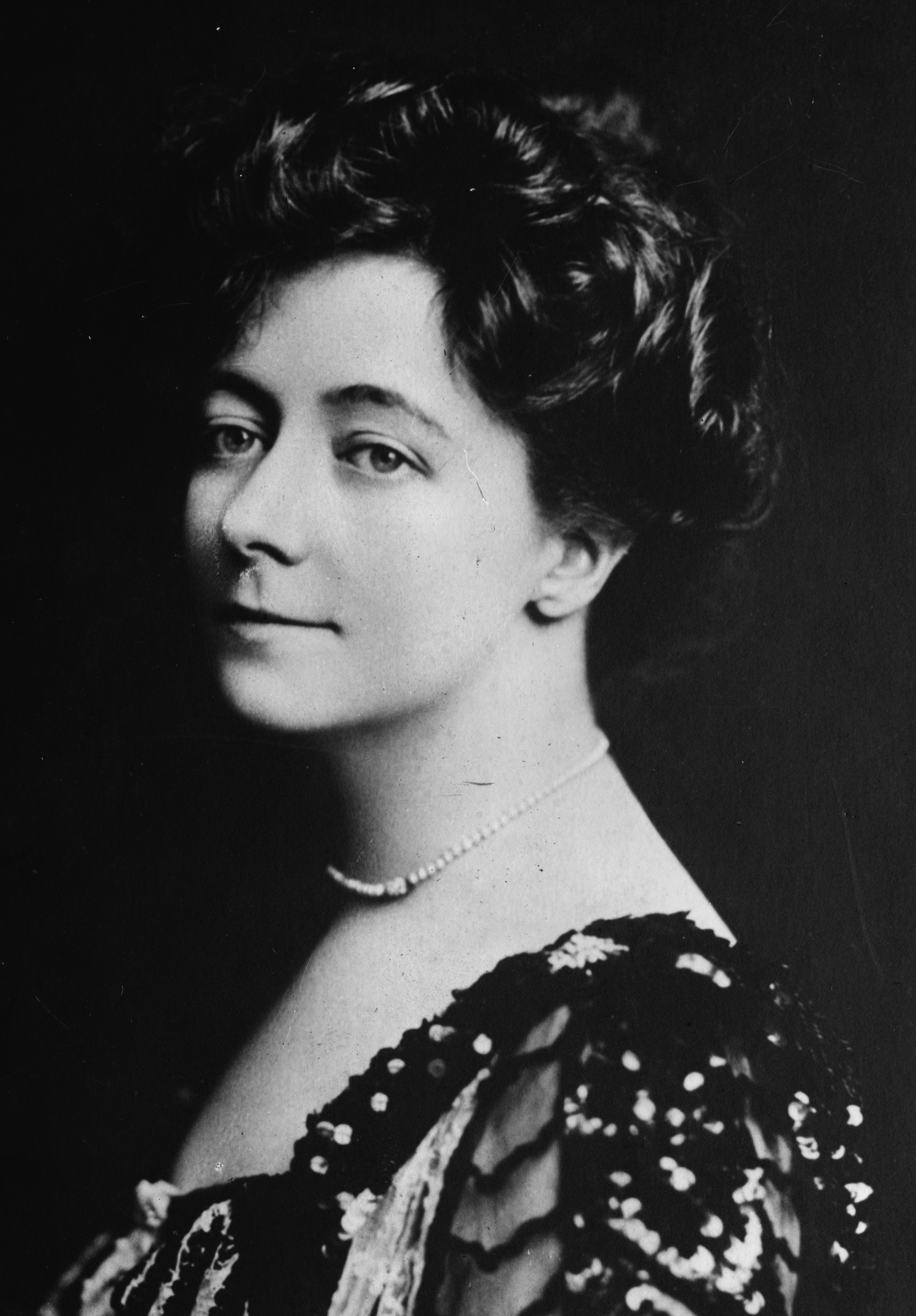
Loftus c. 1922

When she was seventeen, she eloped with Justin Huntly McCarthy (1859–1936), an Irish writer, and associate of her friend and admirer Max Beerbohm. They married in Edinburgh on 29 August 1894. The groom was twice as old as the bride. The marriage failed, and the couple divorced.

In 1908, she married Alonzo Higbee Waterman, an American doctor. By 1914, both her marriage and health were in a perilous state, and an acrimonious divorce ensued in 1920. Her health and the premature birth of their son, Peter, had made her increasingly dependent on alcohol and painkillers. In November 1922, she was arrested for possession of morphine and atropine.

Her fellow actress, Eva Moore bailed her for a surety of £100, and she was put on probation for twelve months at the Great Marlborough Street Magistrates Court. In 1923, she left Great Britain for good, and sailed to New York City to return to Broadway and pursue a career in Hollywood.

Loftus died from a heart attack and the effects of alcoholism at the Lincoln Hotel in New York City, on 12 July 1943, aged 66. Her mother had predeceased her by only three years. She is buried in Kensico Cemetery, Valhalla, Westchester County, New York, in a plot provided by the Actors' Fund.

== Filmography ==
Year	Title	Role	Notes
1913	A Lady of Quality	Clorinda Wildairs	
1914	The City of Promise	The Country Girl	Short
1917	Diana of Dobson's	Diana	
1931	East Lynne	Cornelia Carlyle	
1931	Doctors' Wives	Aunt Amelia	
1931	Young Sinners	Mrs. Sinclair	
1935	Once in a Blue Moon	Duchess	
1939	The Old Maid	Grandmother Lovell	
1939	On Dress Parade	Mrs. Neeley	
1940	The Blue Bird	Granny Tyl	
1940	It's a Date	Sara Frankenstein	
1940	Blame It on Love	Granny	
1940	Lucky Partners	Mrs. Sylvester	
1941	The Black Cat	Henrietta Winslow	(final film role)

== Sources ==
- Commire, Anne (2001). Women in World History:A Biographical Encyclopedia Volume 15. London: Yorkin Publications. ISBN 978-0-7876-4074-3.
