= The Lost Prince (Burnett novel) =

1915 novel by Frances Hodgson Burnett

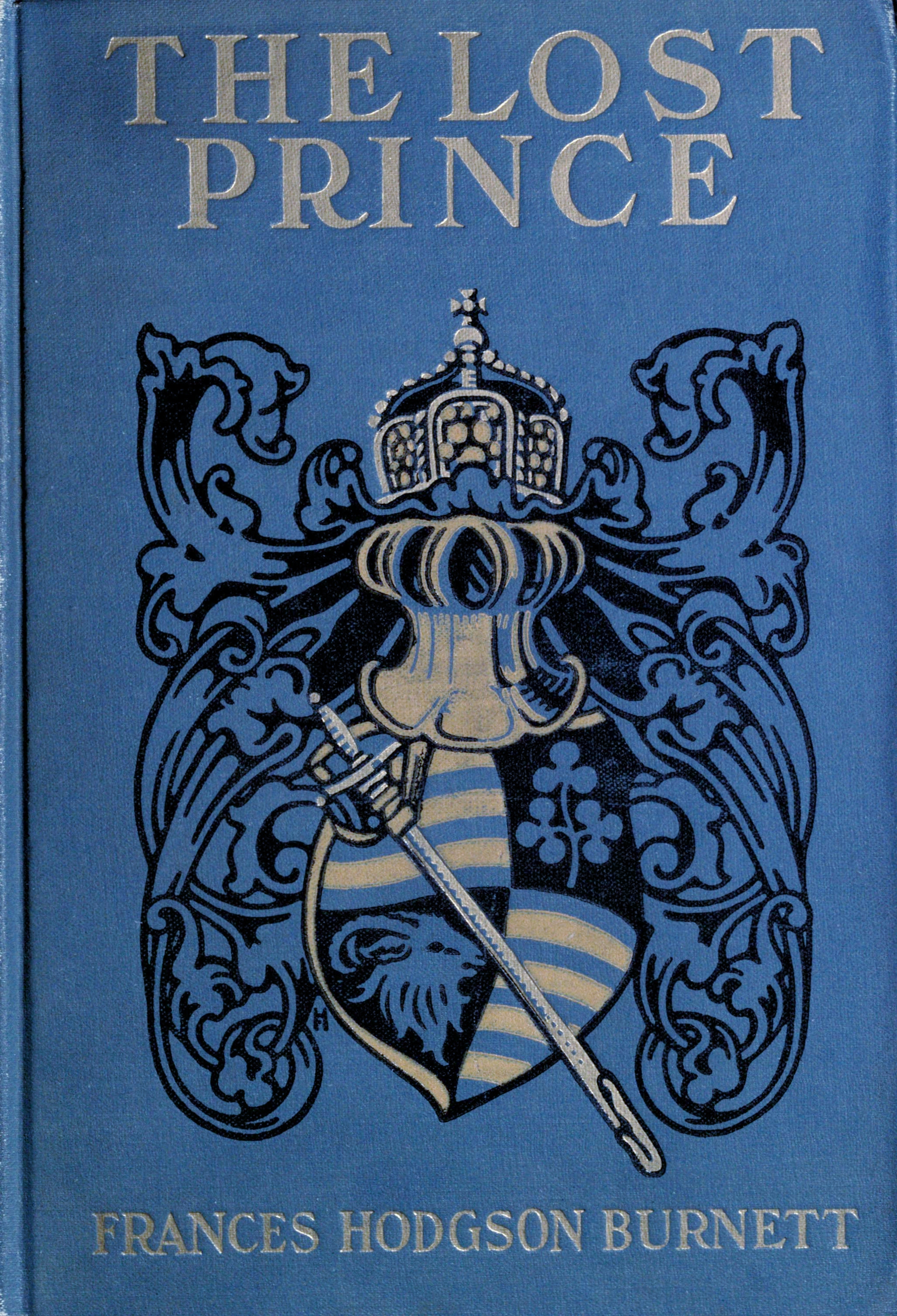
- First edition cover
- Author: Frances Hodgson Burnett
- Illustrator: Maurice L. Bower
- Language: English
- Genre: Children's novel Ruritanian romance
- Publisher: Hodder & Stoughton (UK); Century Co. (US)
- Publication date: 1915
- Publication place: United Kingdom; United States
- Media type: Print (Hardback & Paperback)
- Pages: 415 pp (first edition); 321 pp (1971 Puffin paperback abr. ed.)
- ISBN: 0-8488-1253-0

Chapter 1 of The Lost Prince by Frances Hodgson Burnett

The Lost Prince is a novel by British-American author Frances Hodgson Burnett, first published in 1915.

== Plot summary ==
This book, a Ruritanian romance for children, is about Marco Loristan, his father, and his friend, a street urchin called "The Rat". Marco's father, Stefan, is a Samavian patriot working to overthrow the cruel dictatorship in the kingdom of Samavia. Marco and his father come to London where Marco strikes up a friendship with a crippled street urchin known as The Rat. The friendship occurs when Marco overhears The Rat shouting in military form. Marco discovers he had stumbled upon a club known as the Squad, where the boys drill under the leadership of The Rat, whose education and imagination far exceeds their own.

Stefan, realizing that two boys are less likely to be noticed, entrusts them with a secret mission to travel across Europe giving the secret sign: 'The Lamp is lighted.' Marco is to go as the Bearer of the Sign while The Rat goes as his Aide-de-Camp (so-named at his own request). The boys encounter many dangers while on this journey.

This brings about a revolution which succeeds in overthrowing the old regime and re-establishing the rightful king. When Marco and The Rat return to London, Stefan has already left for Samavia. They wait there with his father's faithful bodyguard, Lazarus, until Stefan calls. The book ends in a climactic scene as Marco realizes his father is the descendant of Ivor Fedorovitch and thus the rightful king of Samavia.

== Setting ==
No precise location is given for Samavia in terms of real life geography. It is described as having been a small kingdom with a pastoral economy during the Middle Ages, ruled by the House of Fedorovitch. The Fedorovitch were overthrown in the early fifteenth century after a rebellion ended in the regicide of the reigning king and the disappearance of his son, Ivor Fedorovitch, the Lost Prince. During the next five centuries, two great Houses, the Iarovitch and the Maranovitch, fought for control of the kingdom in civil wars similar to the Wars of the Roses. In the 1830s a secret organisation of Fedorovitch supporters was formed. Early in the twentieth century the reigning monarch, King Michael Maranovitch, was assassinated, and civil war broke out as Nicola Iarovitch sought to gain the crown. The Secret Party instead proclaimed Stefan Loristan, descendant of the Lost Prince, king.
