= A Lady of Quality (1924 film) =

1924 film by Hobart Henley

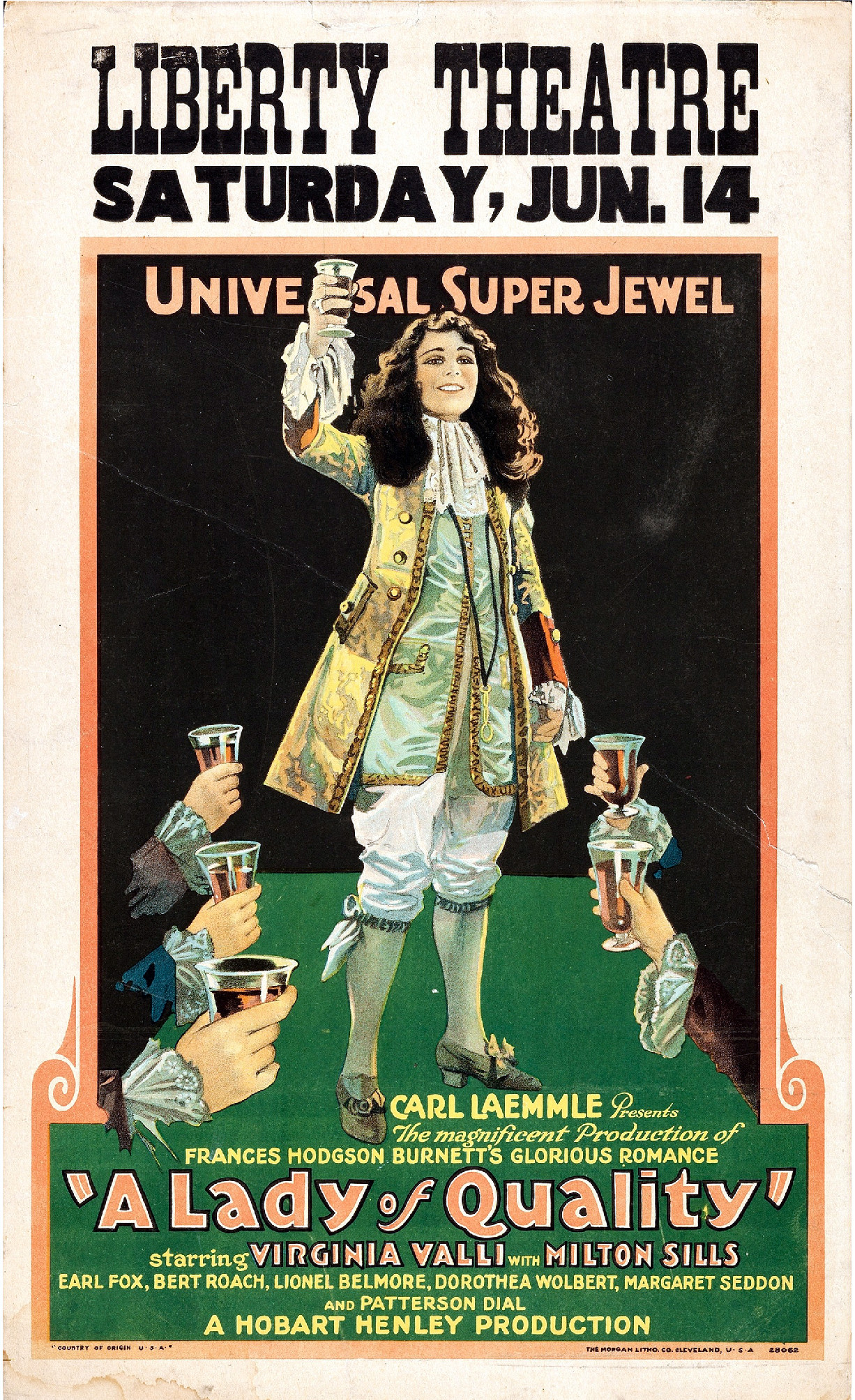
- Lobby poster
- Directed by: Hobart Henley
- Written by: Arthur Ripley; Marian Ainslee
- Based on: A Lady of Quality by Frances Hodgson Burnett
- Produced by: Carl Laemmle
- Starring: Virginia Valli; Milton Sills; Earle Foxe
- Cinematography: John Stumar
- Distributed by: Universal Pictures
- Release date: January 14, 1924
- Running time: 9 reels
- Country: United States
- Language: Silent (English intertitles)

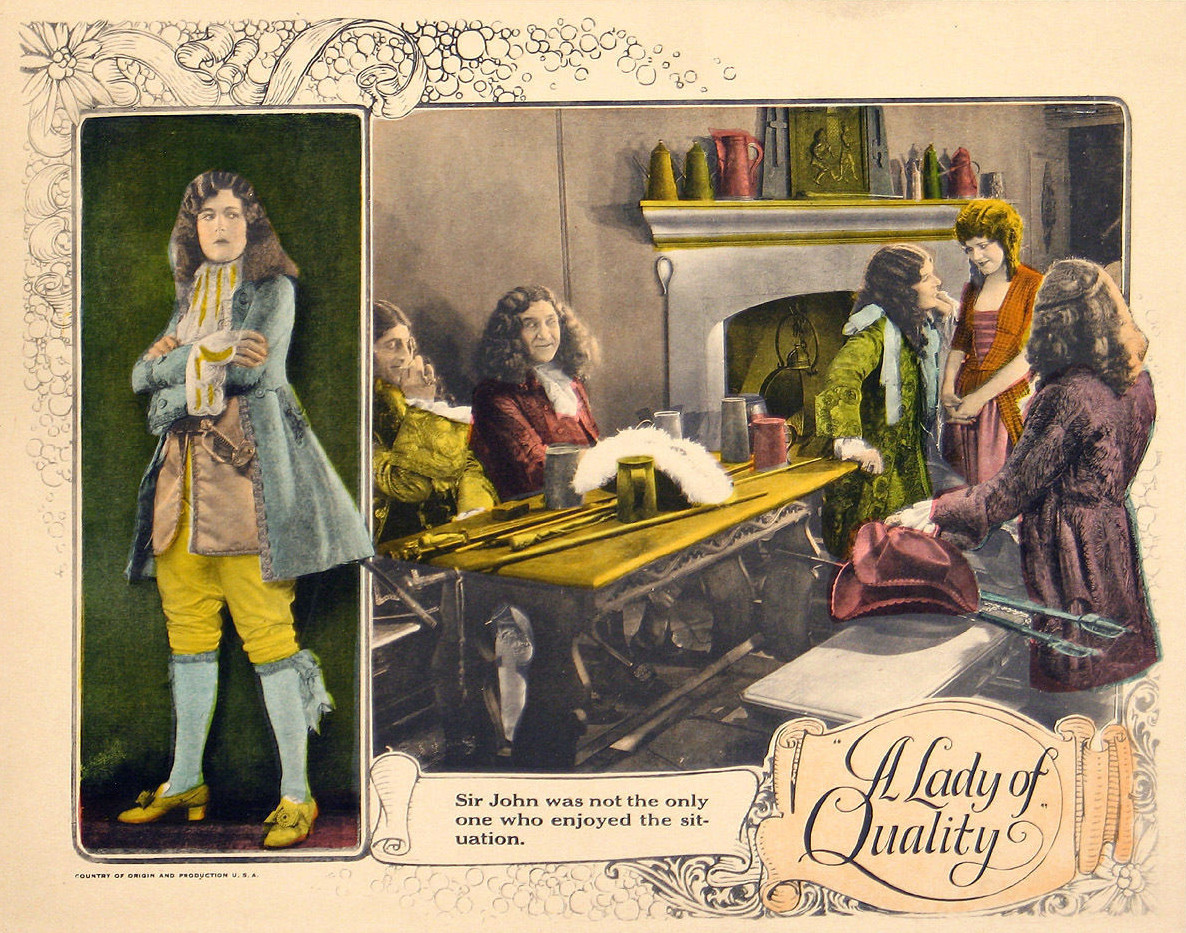
lobby card.

A Lady of Quality is a 1924 American silent historical drama film directed by Hobart Henley and starring Virginia Valli. Produced and distributed by Universal Pictures, it was based on the 1896 novel A Lady of Quality by Frances Hodgson Burnett. Previous adaptations include the film A Lady of Quality (1913).

== Plot ==
As described in a film magazine, Clorinda Wildairs (Valli), brought up as a man as her father had no son, is headstrong, impulsive, unconventional, and fiery. Her contempt for men in any role other than that of sporting pals is dissipated by Sir John Oxen (Foxe), a young blood whose disdain breaks down her barrier and results in winning her affection and trust. Oxen turns out to be an unscrupulous and trifling cad who jilts the almost heart-broken Clorinda. Five years later, with her father dead, Clorinda has become the toast of London and engaged to Gerald Mertoun, Duke of Osmonde (Sills). Together with the forces of the Duke of Buckingham, the Duke has won the Queen's favor with a victory in Flanders. Oxen appears and threatens to compromise Clorinda, jeopardizing her happiness and future. When he makes unwanted advances towards Clorinda, she kills her former betrayer in a tempestuous rage. For days she lives in constant dread lest her deed be discovered. When her sister accidentally happens upon her secret, she connives to aid her in escaping the harsh penalties of the times. Clorinda has the room containing the murdered man's corpse sealed up, never to be disturbed, and flees from London. Her sister informs the Duke of Osmonde of his fiancée's hiding spot, and he joins her, promising that no harm will come to her, that his love will guard and protect her.

== Cast ==
- Virginia Valli as Clorinda Wildairs
- Earle Foxe as Sir John Oxen
- Milton Sills as Gerald Mertoun, Duke of Osmonde
- Lionel Belmore as Sir Geoffrey Wildairs
- Margaret Seddon as Lady Daphne Wildairs
- Peggy Cartwright as Clorinda, age 6
- Florence Gibson as Dame Passett
- Dorothea Wolbert as Mistress Wimpole
- Bert Roach as Sir Christopher Crowell
- Leo White as Sir Humphrey Ware
- George B. Williams as Lord Porkish
- Willard Louis as Tavern Keeper
- Patterson Dial as Annie Wildairs
- Yvonne Armstrong as Annie, 8 years old
- Bobbie Mack as The Groom

== Preservation ==
With no prints of A Lady of Quality held by any film archives, it is a lost film.
