= Queen Silver-Bell =

Novel by Frances Hodgson Burnett

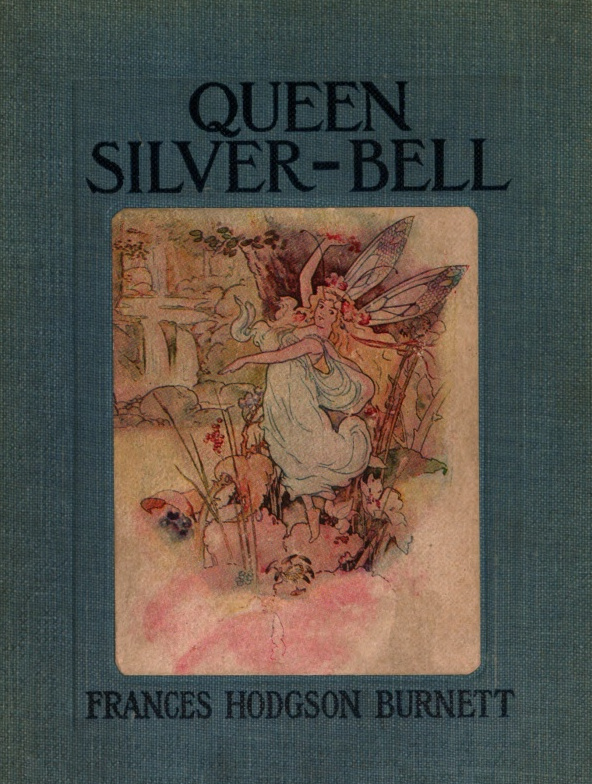
Queen Silver-Bell Book Cover.

Queen Silver-Bell is the first in a series of four children's books by Frances Hodgson Burnett with illustrations by Harrison Cady.

In the first book the queen of the fairies, Queen Silver-Bell, loses her "temper" (which most people do not know is really a fairy) and becomes known from then on as Queen Crosspatch. She knows that she will never find her temper again until she has done something that would make people–-particularly children–-believe in fairies as they used to "once upon a time", so she decides to get a "respectable" person to write the stories down as she tells them. The subsequent stories in the series all have the subtitle "As Told By Queen Crosspatch."

The first book, Queen Silver-Bell, also contains the story "How Winnie Hatched The Little Rooks."

== Books in the series ==
- Queen Silver-Bell (November, 1906)
- Racketty-Packetty House (1906)
- The Cozy Lion (October, 1907)
- The Spring Cleaning (October, 1908)
