= Little Lord Fauntleroy =

1886 novel by Frances Hodgson Burnett

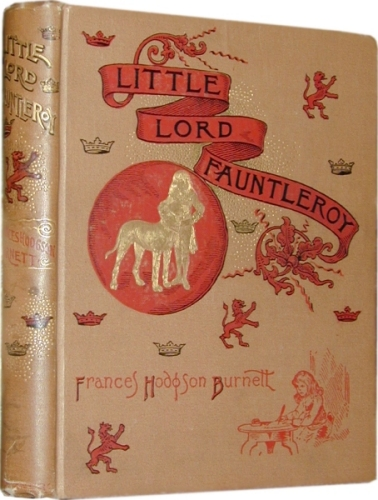
- First edition cover
- Author: Frances Hodgson Burnett
- Illustrator: Reginald B. Birch
- Language: English
- Genre: Children's novel
- Publisher: Scribner's
- Publication date: November 1885 – October 1886 (magazine); October 7, 1886 (novel)
- Publication place: United States; United Kingdom
- Pages: xi + 209 + [17]
- LC Class: PZ7.B934 L
- Text: Little Lord Fauntleroy at Wikisource

Little Lord Fauntleroy is a children's novel by Frances Hodgson Burnett. It was published as a serial in St. Nicholas Magazine from November 1885 to October 1886, then as a book by Scribner's (the publisher of St. Nicholas) on October 7, 1886 in New York. It was also published that year in November by Frederick Warne & Co. in London. The illustrations by Reginald B. Birch set fashion trends and the novel set a precedent in copyright law when Burnett won a lawsuit in 1888 against E.V. Seebohm over the rights to theatrical adaptations of the work.

== Etymology ==
The title surname Fauntleroy is an Anglo-French term ultimately derived from L'enfant le roy ("child of the king"), evoking the image of being pampered and spoiled. More proximally, it is from a Middle English variant faunt from enfaunt, meaning child or infant. It is attested as a real surname since the 13th century.

== Synopsis ==
In a shabby New York City side street in the mid-1880s, young Cedric Errol lives with his mother (known to him as "Dearest") in genteel poverty after the death of his father, Captain Cedric Errol. One day, they are visited by a British lawyer named Havisham, with a message from young Cedric's paternal grandfather, the Earl of Dorincourt, a millionaire who despises the United States and was disappointed when his youngest son married an American woman. With the deaths of his father's elder brothers, Cedric has now inherited the title Lord Fauntleroy and is the heir to the earldom and a vast estate. Cedric's grandfather wants him to live in the United Kingdom and be educated as a British aristocrat. He offers his son's widow a house and guaranteed income, but refuses to have anything else to do with her, even after she declines his money.

However, the earl is impressed by the appearance and intelligence of his American grandson and is charmed by his innocent nature. Cedric believes his grandfather to be an honorable man and benefactor, and the earl cannot disappoint him. The earl therefore becomes a benefactor to his tenants, to their delight, but he takes care to let them know that their benefactor is the child Lord Fauntleroy.

Meanwhile, back in New York, a homeless bootblack named Dick Tipton tells Cedric's old friend Mr. Hobbs, a New York City grocer, that a few years prior, after the death of his parents, Dick's older brother Benjamin married an awful woman who got rid of their only child together after he was born and then left. Benjamin moved to California to open a cattle ranch while Dick ended up in the streets. At the same time, a neglected pretender to Cedric's inheritance appears in the United Kingdom, the pretender's mother claiming that he is the offspring of the earl's eldest son, Bevis. The claim is investigated by Dick and Benjamin, who come to the United Kingdom and recognize the woman as Benjamin's former wife. She flees, and the Tipton brothers and the pretender, Benjamin's son, do not see her again. Afterward, Benjamin goes back to his cattle ranch in California where he happily raises his son by himself. The earl is reconciled to his American daughter-in-law, realizing that she is far superior to the impostor.

The Earl had planned to teach his grandson how to be an aristocrat. Instead, Cedric teaches his grandfather that an aristocrat should practice compassion towards those dependent on him. The earl becomes the man Cedric always innocently believed him to be. Cedric is happily reunited with his mother and with Mr. Hobbs, who decides to stay to help look after Cedric.

== Effect on fashion ==
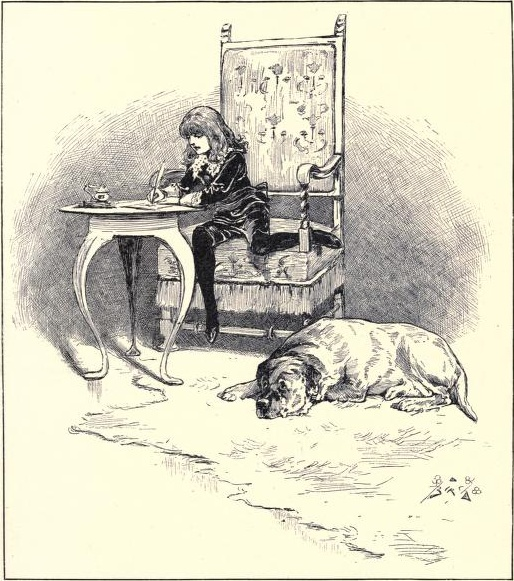
An illustration by Birch from 1886

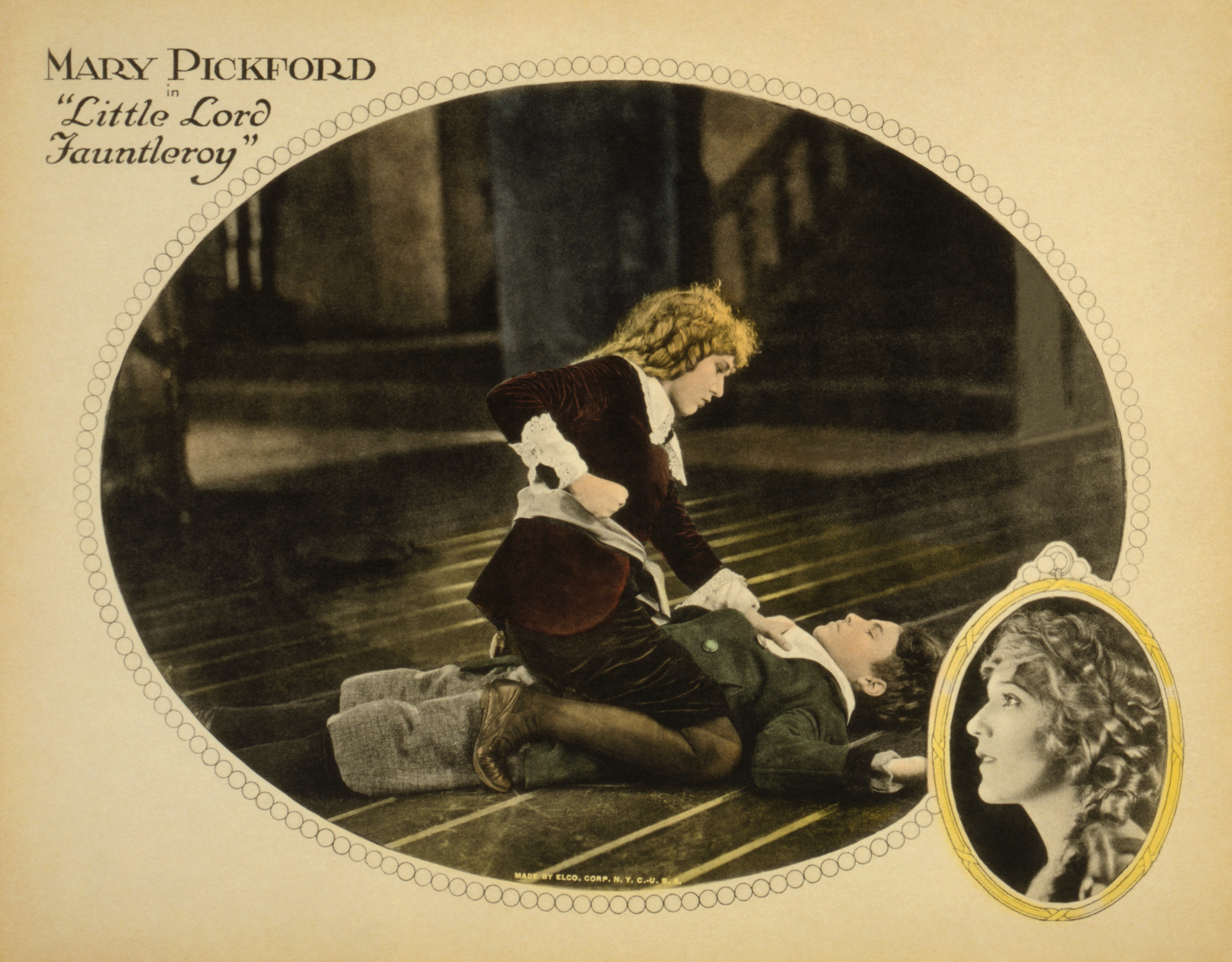
Lobby card from the 1921 film adaptation starring Mary Pickford

The Fauntleroy suit (see also Buster Brown suit), so well described by Burnett and realised in Reginald Birch's detailed pen-and-ink drawings, created a fad for formal dress for American middle-class children:

What the Earl saw was a graceful, childish figure in a black velvet suit, with a lace collar, and with lovelocks waving about the handsome, manly little face, whose eyes met his with a look of innocent good-fellowship.

— Little Lord Fauntleroy

The Fauntleroy suit appeared in Europe as well but nowhere was it as popular as in the United States. The classic Fauntleroy suit was a velvet cut-away jacket and matching knee pants, worn with a fancy blouse and a large lace or ruffled collar. These suits appeared right after the publication of Burnett's story (1885) and were a major fashion for boys until after the turn of the 20th century. Many boys who did not wear an actual Fauntleroy suit wore suits with Fauntleroy elements, such as a fancy blouse or floppy bow. Only a minority of boys wore ringlet curls with these suits, but the photographic record confirms that many boys did.

It was most popular for boys from 3 to 8 years of age, but some older boys wore them as well. It has been speculated that the popularity of the style encouraged many mothers to breech their boys earlier than before, and it was a factor in the decline of the fashion for dressing small boys in dresses and other skirted garments. Clothing that Burnett popularised was modelled on the costumes which she tailored herself for her two sons, Vivian and Lionel.

== Reception ==
Polly Hovarth writes that Little Lord Fauntleroy "was the Harry Potter of his time and Frances Hodgson Burnett was as celebrated for creating him as J.K. Rowling is for Potter". During the serialisation in St. Nicholas magazine, readers looked forward to new installments. The fashions in the book became popular with velvet Lord Fauntleroy suits being sold as well as other Fauntleroy merchandise such as velvet collars, playing cards, and chocolates. During a period when sentimental fiction was the norm, and in the United States the "rags to riches" story popular, Little Lord Fauntleroy was a hit.

Donald Duck's middle name of Fauntleroy and his sailor suit costume is said to have its origins from Little Lord Fauntleroy.

Edith Nesbit included in her own children's book The Enchanted Castle (1907) a rather unflattering reference:

Gerald could always make himself look interesting at a moment's notice...by opening his grey eyes rather wide, allowing the corners of his mouth to droop, and assuming a gentle, pleading expression, resembling that of the late little Lord Fauntleroy who must, by the way, be quite old now, and an awful prig.

== Adaptations ==
=== Stage ===
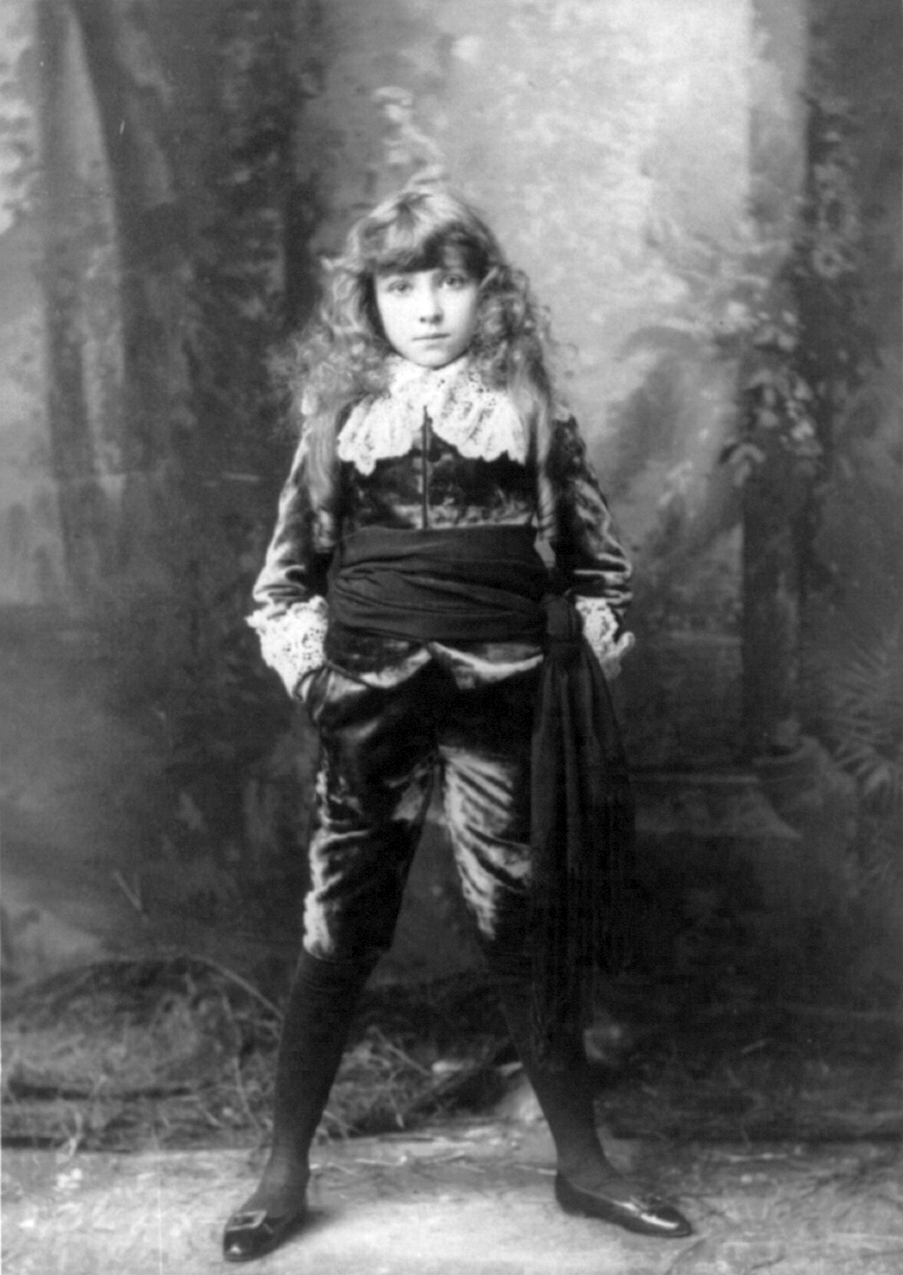
Elsie Leslie in the Broadway production of Little Lord Fauntleroy (1888).

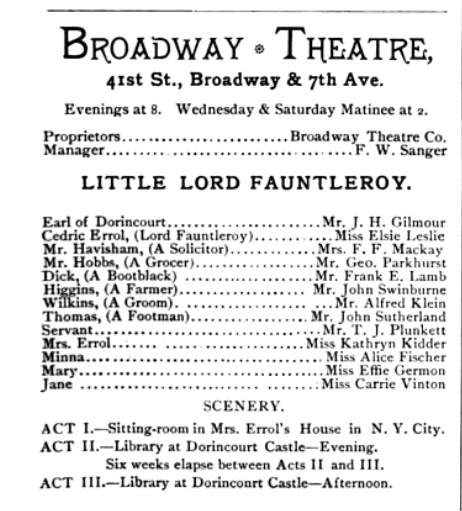
Broadway cast listed in The Theatre.

The first stage adaptation of Hodgson's novel, titled simply Little Lord Fauntleroy, opened at the Prince of Wales' Theatre in London on 23 Feb 1888. Written by E.V. Seebohm, the piece in three acts was "suggested by Mrs F. H, Burnett's story", starred Annie Hughes as Cedric and played only a short season of matinees. After discovering her novel had been plagiarized for the stage, Burnett successfully sued and then wrote her own theatrical adaptation titled The Real Little Lord Fauntleroy. Opening on 14 May, at Terry's Theatre in London it played for 57 matinees and was subsequently presented in the English provinces, France, Boston and New York City.

The Broadway production of Burnett's play opened on 10 December 1888, at the Broadway Theatre, New York City. The original cast follows:

- Earl of Dorincourt – J. H. Gilmour
- Cedric Errol (Lord Fauntleroy) – Elsie Leslie and Tommy Russell
- Mr. Havisham, a Solicitor – F. F. Mackay
- Mr. Hobbs, a Grocer – George A. Parkhurst
- Dick, a Bootblack – Frank E. Lamb
- Higgins, a Farmer – John Swinburne
- Wilkins, a Groom – Alfred Klein
- Thomas, a Footman – John Sutherland
- James, a Servant – T. J. Plunkett
- Mrs. Errol ("Dearest") – Kathryn Kidder
- Minna – Alice Fischer
- Mary – Effie Germon

Touring versions of the play were common in the late 19th and early 20th century. A 1906 version cast 11-year-old Buster Keaton in the role of Lord Fauntleroy.

In 1994, an Australian open-air/site specific theatre production of Little Lord Fauntleroy, adapted by Julia Britton and directed by Robert Chuter, was presented in the historical gardens of the National Trust of Australia (Victoria) property Rippon Lea.

=== Film and television ===
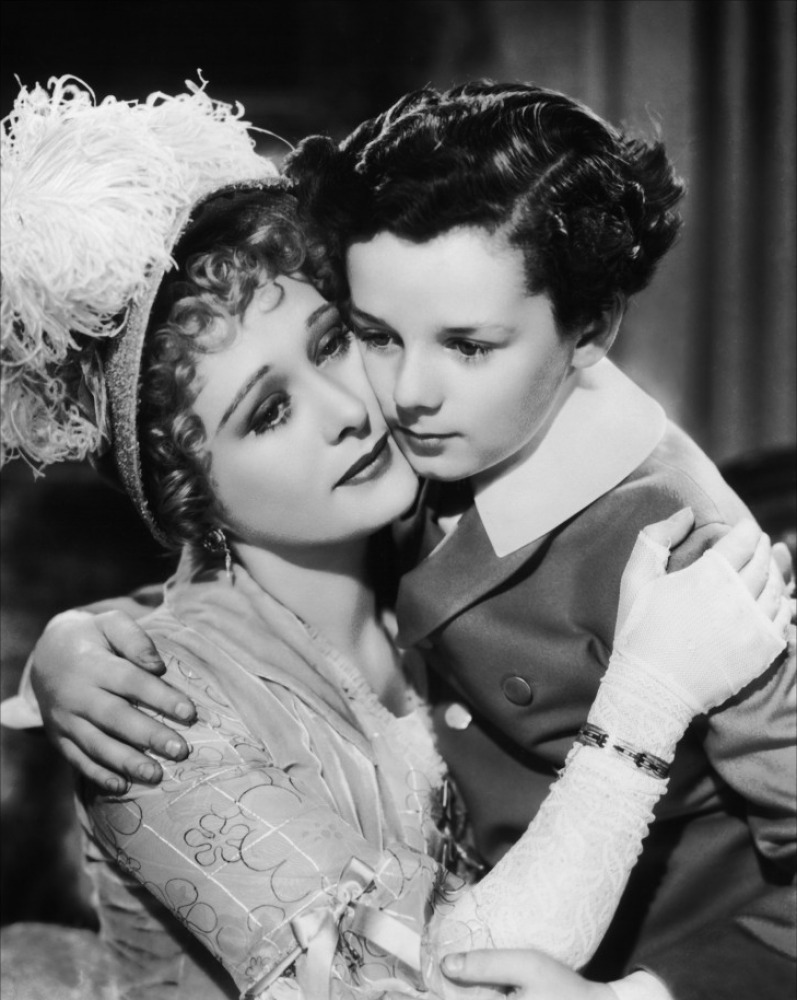
Dolores Costello and Freddie Bartholomew in Little Lord Fauntleroy (1936)

- Little Lord Fauntleroy (1914), a British silent film, one of the last made in Kinemacolor, directed by F. Martin Thornton, starring Gerald Royston (Cedric); H. Agar Lyons (The Earl); Jane Wells (Dearest); Bernard Vaughan (Mr. Havisham); F. Tomkins (Mr. Hobbs); and Harry Edwards (Dick).
- Little Lord Fauntleroy (A Kis Lord) (1918), a Hungarian silent film, directed by Alexander Antalffy, starring Tibor Lubinszky (Cedric); Alexander Antalffy (The Earl); Giza Báthory (Dearest); József Hajdú (Mr. Havisham); Jenõ Horváth (Mr. Hobbs); Ernõ Kenessey (Dick).
- Little Lord Fauntleroy (1921), an American silent film, directed by Alfred E. Green and Jack Pickford, starring Mary Pickford (Cedric & Dearest); Claude Gillingwater (The Earl); Joseph J. Dowling (Mr. Havisham); James A. Marcus (Mr. Hobbs); Fred Malatesta (Dick).
- L'ultimo Lord (1926), an Italian silent film, directed by Augusto Genina, starring Carmen Boni (Freddie). Based on L'ultimo Lord by Ugo Falena.
- Little Lord Fauntleroy (1936), arguably the best-known adaptation, directed by John Cromwell, starring Freddie Bartholomew (Cedric); C. Aubrey Smith (The Earl); Dolores Costello (Dearest); Henry Stephenson (Mr. Havisham); Guy Kibbee (Mr. Hobbs); Mickey Rooney (Dick).
- Il ventesimo duca (1945), an Italian film, directed by Lucio De Caro, starring Paola Veneroni ("Freddie"). Based on L'ultimo Lord by Ugo Falena.
- O Pequeno Lord (1957), Brazilian soap opera written by Tatiana Belinky and directed by Júlio Golveia.
- Little Lord Fauntleroy (1957), a TV miniseries, starring Richard O'Sullivan (Cedric).
- Il piccolo Lord (1960), an Italian TV miniseries (sceneggiato) aired on RAI, directed by Vittorio Brignole, starring Sandro Pistolini (Cedric); Michele Malaspina (The Earl); Andreina Paul (Dearest); Attilio Ortolani (Mr. Havisham); Giuseppe Mancini (Mr. Hobbs); Ermanno Anfossi (Dick).
- Der kleine Lord (1962), a German TV film aired on Bayerischer Rundfunk (BR), directed by Franz Josef Wild, starring Manfred Kunst (Cedric); Albrecht Schoenhals (The Earl); Gertrud Kückelmann (Dearest); Sigfrit Steiner (Mr. Havisham); Eric Pohlmann (Mr. Hobbs); Michael Ande.
- Lille Lord Fauntleroy (1966), a Norwegian TV film, directed by Alfred Solaas, starring Gøsta Hagenlund (Cedric).
- O Pequeno Lord (1967), remake Brazilian of the 1957 version of Tatiana Belincky, directed by Antônio Abujamra, starring Paulo Castelli, Elísio de Albuquerque, Patrícia Mayo and Serafim Gonzalez.
- Il Piccolo Lord (1971), an Italian TV movie, directed by Luciano Emmer, starring Ellen and Alice Kessler, Johnny Dorelli, Dina Perbellini, and Alice Rossi.
- Little Lord Fauntleroy (1976), a BBC TV miniseries, directed by Paul Annett, starring Glenn Anderson (Cedric); Paul Rogers (the Earl); Jennie Linden (Dearest); Preston Lockwood (Mr. Havisham); Ray Smith (Mr. Hobbs); Paul D'Amato (Dick).
- As one installment in 1977 of the late 1970s children's television show Once Upon a Classic.
- Little Lord Fauntleroy (1980), a popular adaptation, directed by Jack Gold, starring Ricky Schroder (Cedric); Alec Guinness (The Earl); Connie Booth (Dearest); Eric Porter (Mr. Havisham); Colin Blakely (Mr. Hobbs); and Rolf Saxon (Dick). This film has become a Christmas classic in Germany.
- The Adventures of Little Lord Fauntleroy was a 1982 TV movie, directed by Desmond Davis and starring Jerry Supiran (Cedric); John Mills (The Earl), and Caroline Smith (Dearest).
- Little Lord Fauntleroy (1988), a Japanese anime series, also known as Shōkōshi Cedie (小公子セディ Shōkōshi Sedi, trans. Little Prince Cedie), directed by Kōzō Kusuba, spanning 43 episodes (20–25-minute each per episode) based on the same novel. The anime has been translated in many languages, notably French, German, Italian, Spanish, Dutch, Tagalog, Polish and Arabic. In this adaptation (and in the Filipino film adaptation based on it), Cedric's mother is named "Annie", and his father, "James" (in contrast to the novel's namesake), who was seen alive in the early episodes of the series until his untimely demise on episode five.
- Il Piccolo Lord/Der kleine Lord (1994), an Italian and German co–production TV movie, aired on RAI and ARD, directed by Gianfranco Albano, starring Francesco De Pasquale (Cedric) and Mario Adorf (The Earl).
- Little Lord Fauntleroy (1995), a BBC TV mini-series adaptation by Julian Fellowes, directed by Andrew Morgan, starring Michael Benz (Cedric) and George Baker (The Earl).
- Cedie: Ang Munting Prinsipe (Cedie: The Little Prince) (1996), a Filipino film adaptation, directed by Romy Suzara, starring Tom Taus.
- Little lord's joy and sorrow (Russian: Радости и печали маленького лорда, romanized: Radosti i pechali malenʹkogo lorda) (2003), a Russian film, directed by Ivan Popov, starring Aleksey Vesyolkin (Cedric).
- Little Lady (2012), an Austrian TV movie aired on ZDF, directed by Gernot Roll, starring Philippa Schöne in the role of a little countess.

== Sources ==
- Horvath, Polly (2004), "Foreword", Little Lord Fauntleroy, Simon and Schuster, ISBN 978-0-689-86994-5.
- Rutherford, L. M. (1994), "British Children's Writers 1880–1914", in Laura M. Zaldman, Dictionary of Literary Biography, Volume 141, Detroit: Gale Research Literature Resource Center.
