= Tokimeite =

1991 single by Hikaru Nishida

Single by Hikaru Nishida

from the album Esprit
- Language: Japanese
- English title: Crush
- B-side: "Ki-su"
- Released: August 7, 1991
- Recorded: 1991
- Genre: J-pop; kayōkyoku
- Label: Pony Canyon
- Composer(s): Kyōhei Tsutsumi
- Lyricist(s): Takashi Matsumoto

Hikaru Nishida singles chronology
"Kokoro dake Soba ni Iru (Here in My Heart)" (1991)	"Tokimeite" (1991)	"Meguri Ai" (1992)

"Tokimeite" (ときめいて, lit. "Crush") is the 11th single by Japanese entertainer Hikaru Nishida. Written by Takashi Matsumoto and Kyōhei Tsutsumi, the single was released on August 7, 1991, by Pony Canyon.

== Background and release ==
As Nishida had gone through three years without a hit song, her music director Kazuhiro Nagaoka had Matsumoto and Tsutsumi compose a song for her, as the duo's collaborative efforts resulted in the early success of Miho Nakayama. "Tokimeite" was used as the theme song of the TBS drama series Depart! Natsu Monogatari (デパート!夏物語, Depāto! Natsu Monogatari, Depart! Summer Story).

"Tokimeite" peaked at No. 7 on Oricon's weekly singles chart, becoming Nishida's first and only top-10 single. The single also earned her a performance on the 42nd Kōhaku Uta Gassen in 1991, marking her debut on NHK's New Year's Eve special.

== Track listing ==
No.	Title	Lyrics	Music	Arrangement	Length
1.	"Tokimeite" (Tokimeite (ときめいて, lit. 'Crush'))	Takashi Matsumoto	Kyōhei Tsutsumi	Iteru Watanabe
2.	"Ki-su" (Kisu (キ☆ス))	Shun Taguchi	Megumi Ishii	Hiroshi Uesugi
3.	"Tokimeite" (Original Karaoke)

== Charts ==
Chart (1991)	Peak position
Oricon Weekly Singles Chart	7
