= A Lady of Quality (novel) =

1896 novel by Frances Hodgson Burnett

A Lady of Quality is a novel published in 1896 by Frances Hodgson Burnett that was the second highest best-selling book in the United States in 1896. It was the first of series of successful historical novels by Burnett.

In addition to a play version of the novel, which debuted in 1897 featuring Julia Arthur, silent-film adaptations were released in 1913 and 1924.
