= Frances Hodgson Burnett =

English-American novelist (1849–1924)

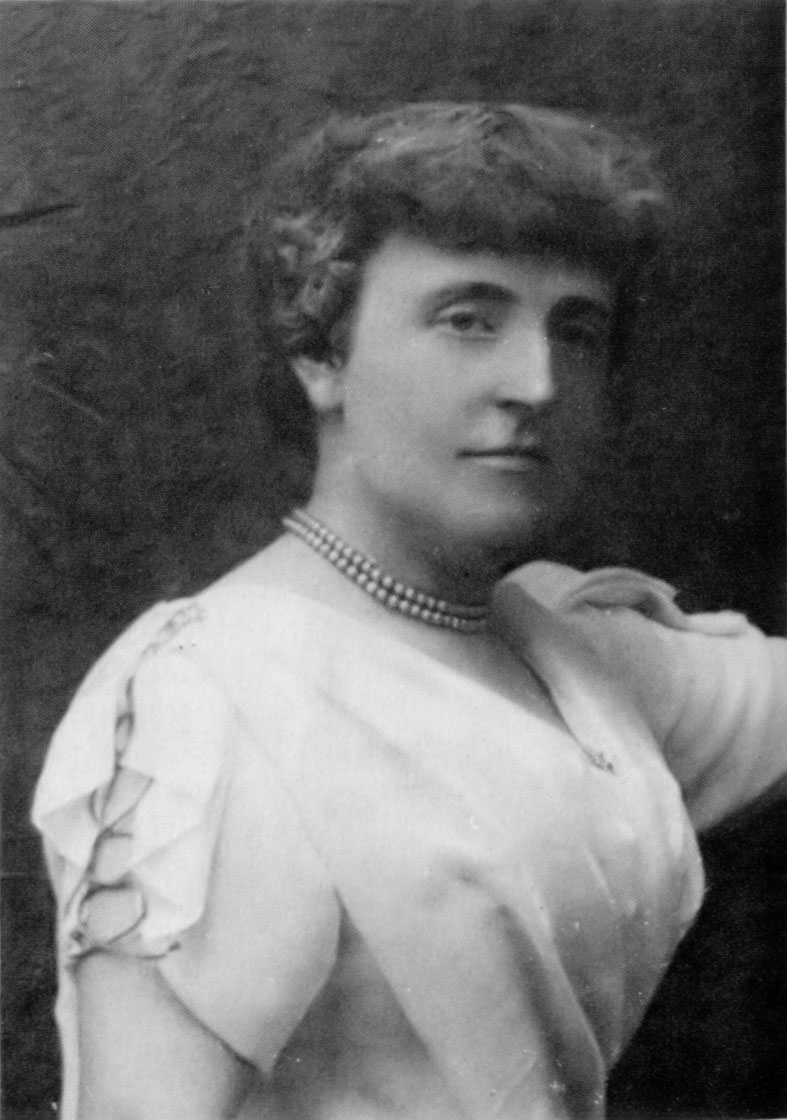
- Burnett in 1888
- Born: Frances Eliza Hodgson; 24 November 1849; Cheetham, Manchester, England, United Kingdom
- Died: 29 October 1924 (aged 74); Plandome Manor, New York, United States
- Citizenship: United Kingdom (from birth); United States (from 1905)
- Occupations: Novelist, playwright
- Spouses: Swan Burnett (m. 1873; div. 1898) Stephen Townsend (m. 1900; div. 1902)
- Children: 2

Frances Eliza Hodgson Burnett (24 November 1849 – 29 October 1924) was an English-American novelist and playwright. She is best known for the three children's novels Little Lord Fauntleroy (1886), A Little Princess (1905), and The Secret Garden (1911).

Hodgson was born in Cheetham, Manchester, England. After her father died in 1853, when Frances was only four years old, the family fell on strained circumstances and emigrated to the United States 12 years later, settling in New Market, Tennessee. Frances began her writing career there at age 19 to help earn money for the family, publishing stories in magazines. In 1870, her mother died. Three years later, Hodgson married Swan Burnett in Knoxville, Tennessee, who became a medical doctor. Their first son, Lionel, was born a year later. The Burnetts lived for two years in Paris, where their second son, Vivian, was born, before returning to the United States to live in Washington, D.C. Burnett then began to write novels, the first of which (That Lass o' Lowrie's), was published to good reviews. Little Lord Fauntleroy was published in 1886 and made her a popular writer of children's fiction, although her romantic adult novels written in the 1890s were also popular. She wrote and helped to produce stage versions of Little Lord Fauntleroy and A Little Princess.

Beginning in the 1880s, Burnett began to travel to England frequently and in the 1890s bought a home there, where she wrote The Secret Garden. Burnett's elder son, Lionel, died of tuberculosis in 1890, which caused a relapse of the depression she had struggled with for much of her life. Burnett divorced her husband in 1898 and married Stephen Townsend two years later, but they divorced in 1902. A few years later, Burnett settled in Nassau County, New York, where she died in 1924 and is buried in Roslyn Cemetery.

In 1936, a memorial sculpture by Bessie Potter Vonnoh was erected in Burnett's honour in Central Park's Conservatory Garden. The statue depicts her two famous Secret Garden characters, Mary and Dickon.

== Biography ==
=== Childhood in Manchester, England ===
Frances Eliza Hodgson was born at 141 York Street (Note: York Street was later renamed and became Cheetham Hill Road. The house, along with the other houses in the terrace, was demolished in the 1990s to make way for new development.) in Cheetham, Manchester on 24 November 1849. She was the third of five children of Edwin Hodgson, an ironmonger from Doncaster in Yorkshire, and his wife Eliza Boond, from a well-to-do Manchester family. Her father owned a business in Deansgate, selling ironmongery and brass goods. The family lived comfortably, employing a maid and a nursemaid. Frances had two older brothers and two younger sisters.

In 1852, the family moved about a mile away to a newly built terrace, opposite St Luke's Church, with greater access to outdoor space. (Note: The house, which was extant when Thwaite's book was published in 1991, later became number 385 Cheetham Hill Road. Manchester City Council mounted a blue plaque on the front which read "Frances Hodgson Burnett (1849–1924) Novelist and Authoress of 'Little Lord Fauntleroy' and many other works lived here (1852–1854)" The house was later demolished and the plaque is now on show at the Metropolitan University of Manchester.) Barely a year later, on 1 September 1853 and with his wife pregnant for a fifth time, Hodgson died suddenly of a stroke, leaving the family without an income. Frances was cared for by her grandmother while her mother took over running the family business. From her grandmother, who bought her books, Frances learned to love reading, in particular her first book, The Flower Book, which had colored illustrations and poems. Because of their reduced income, Eliza had to give up their family home and moved with her children to live with relatives in Seedley Grove, Tanners Lane, Pendleton, Salford, where they lived in a house with a large, enclosed garden in which Frances enjoyed playing.

For a year, Frances went to a small dame school run by two women, where she first saw a book about fairies. When her mother moved the family to Islington Square, Salford, Frances mourned the lack of flowers and gardens. Their new home was located in a gated square of faded gentility adjacent to an area with severe overcrowding and poverty that "defied description", according to Friedrich Engels, who lived in Manchester at the time.

Frances had a fertile imagination, writing stories of her own creation in old notebooks. One of her favorite books was Harriet Beecher Stowe's novel Uncle Tom's Cabin, and she spent many hours acting out scenes from the story. Frances and her siblings were sent to be educated at The Select Seminary for Young Ladies and Gentlemen, where she was described as "precocious" and "romantic". She had an active social life and enjoyed telling stories to her friends and cousins; in her mother, she found a good audience, although her brothers tended to tease her about her stories.

Manchester was almost entirely dependent on a cotton economy that was ruined by the Lancashire cotton famine brought about by the American Civil War. In 1863, Eliza Hodgson was forced to sell their business and move the family once again to an even smaller home; at that time, Frances' limited education came to an end. Eliza's brother (Frances' uncle), William Boond, asked the family to join him in Knoxville, Tennessee, where he now had a thriving dry goods store. Within the year, Eliza decided to accept his offer and move the family from Manchester. She sold their possessions and told Frances to burn her early writings in the fire. In 1865, the family emigrated to the United States and settled near Knoxville.

=== Move to Tennessee ===
Burnett as a young woman

After the end of the Civil War and the trade it had brought to the area, Frances' uncle lost much of his business and was unable to provide for the newly arrived family. The family went to live in a log cabin during their first winter in New Market, outside Knoxville. They later moved to a home in Knoxville that Frances called "Noah's Ark, Mt. Ararat", a name inspired by the house's location atop an isolated hill. Living across from them was the Burnett family, and Frances became friendly with Swan Burnett, introducing him to books by authors such as Charles Dickens, Sir Walter Scott and William Makepeace Thackeray that she had read in England. She may have befriended him because of a childhood injury that left him lame and unable to participate in physical activities. Not long after they met, Swan left for college in Ohio.

Frances turned to writing to earn money. Her first story was published in Godey's Lady's Book in 1868. Soon after, Frances was being published regularly in Godey's Lady's Book, Scribner's Monthly, Peterson's Magazine and Harper's Bazaar. Keen to escape from the family's poverty, she tended to overwork herself, later writing that she had been "a pen driving machine" during the early years of her career. For five years, Frances wrote constantly, often not worrying about the quality of her work. Once her first story was published, before she was 18, Frances spent the rest of her life as a working writer. By 1869, she had earned enough to move the family into a better home in Knoxville. Her mother died the following year, and within two years, her two sisters and one of her brothers were married. Although she remained friends with Swan, neither was in a hurry to be married.

=== Marriage ===
With the income from her writing, Frances returned to England for an extended visit in 1872, and then went to Paris where, having agreed to marry Swan, she ordered an haute couture wedding dress to be made and shipped to Tennessee. Shortly afterward, Frances returned home and attempted to postpone the wedding until the dress arrived, but Swan insisted they marry as soon as possible, and they were married in September 1873. Writing about the dress disappointment to a Manchester friend, she said of her new husband: "Men are so shallow ... he does not know the vital importance of the difference between white satin and tulle, and cream-coloured brocade". Frances gave birth to her first child, Lionel, in September 1874. That same year, she began work on her first full-length novel, That Lass o' Lowrie's, set in Lancashire.

The couple wanted to leave Knoxville, and her writing income allowed them to travel to Paris, where Swan continued his medical training as an eye and ear specialist. The birth of their second son, Vivian, forced them to return to the United States. She had wanted her second child to be a girl, and having chosen the name Vivien, and changed to the masculine spelling for her new son. The family continued to rely on her writing income, and to economize, Burnett made clothing for her sons, often including many frills. Later, Burnett continued to make clothing, designing velvet suits with lace collars for her boys and frilly dresses for herself. She allowed her sons' hair to grow long, which she then shaped into long curls.

=== Moved to Washington, D.C. ===
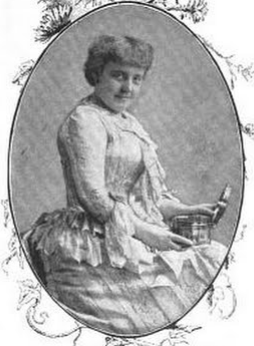
Burnett in 1890

After two years in Paris, the family intended to move to Washington, D.C., where Swan, now qualified as a doctor, wanted to start his medical practice. However, as they were in debt, Frances was forced to live with Swan's parents in New Market while he established himself in D.C. Early in 1877, she was offered a contract to have That Lass o' Lowrie's published, which was doing well in its serialisation, and at that point, she made her husband her business manager. That Lass o' Lowrie's was published to good reviews, and the rights were sold for a British edition. Shortly after the publication of the book, Burnett joined her husband in D.C., where she established a household and friends. She continued writing, becoming known as a rising young novelist. Despite the difficulties of raising a family and settling into a new city, Burnett began work on Haworth's, which was published in 1879, as well as writing a dramatic interpretation of That Lass o' Lowrie's in response to a pirated stage version presented in London. After a visit to Boston in 1879, where she met Louisa May Alcott, and Mary Mapes Dodge, editor of children's magazine St. Nicholas, Burnett began to write children's fiction. For the next five years, she had published several short works in St. Nicholas. Burnett continued to write adult fiction as well: Louisiana was published in 1880; A Fair Barbarian in 1881; and Through One Administration in 1883. She wrote the play Esmerelda in 1881 while staying at the "Logan House" inn near Lake Lure, North Carolina; it became the longest-running play on Broadway in the 19th century. However, as had happened earlier in Knoxville, Burnett felt the pressure of maintaining a household, caring for children and a husband, and keeping to her writing schedule, which caused exhaustion and depression.

Within a few years, Burnett became well known in Washington society and hosted a literary salon on Tuesday evenings, often attended by politicians, as well as local literati. Swan's practice grew and had a good reputation, but his income lagged behind hers, so Burnett believed she had to continue writing. Unfortunately, she was often ill and suffered from the heat of D.C., which she escaped whenever possible. In the early 1880s, Burnett became interested in Christian Science as well as Spiritualism and Theosophy. These beliefs would affect her later life as well as being incorporated into her later fiction. Burnett was a devoted mother and took great joy in her two sons. She doted on their appearance, continuing the practice of curling their long hair each day, which became the inspiration for Little Lord Fauntleroy.

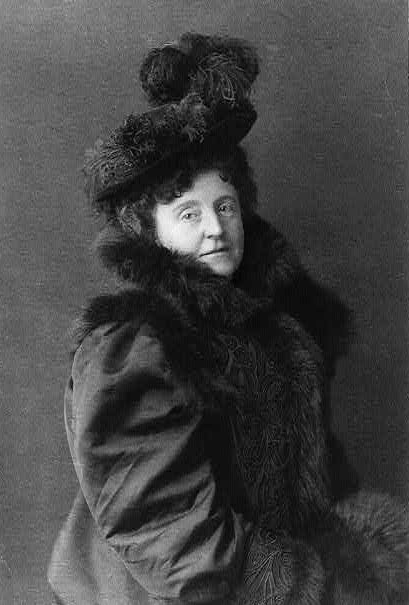
Burnett, date unknown (1890–1910)

In 1884, Burnett began working on Little Lord Fauntleroy, with the serialization beginning the following year in St. Nicholas, and the publication in book form in 1886. Little Lord Fauntleroy received good reviews, became a bestseller in the United States and the United Kingdom, was translated into 12 languages and secured Burnett's reputation as a writer. The story features a boy who dresses in elaborate velvet suits and wears his long hair in curls. The protagonist, Cedric, was modeled on Burnett's younger son Vivian, and the autobiographical aspects of Little Lord Fauntleroy occasionally led to disparaging remarks from the press. After the publication of Little Lord Fauntleroy, Burnett's reputation as a writer of children's books was fully established. In 1888, she won a lawsuit in the UK over the dramatic rights to Little Lord Fauntleroy, establishing a precedent that was incorporated into British copyright law in 1911. In response to a second incident of pirating her material into a dramatic piece, Burnett wrote The Real Little Lord Fauntleroy, which was produced on stage in London and on Broadway. The play went on to make her as much money as the book.

=== Return to United Kingdom ===
In 1887, Burnett travelled to The United Kingdom for Queen Victoria's Golden Jubilee, which became the first of yearly transatlantic trips from the United States to United Kingdom. Accompanied by her sons, Burnett visited tourist attractions such as Madame Tussaud's Wax Museum in London. In her rented rooms, Burnett continued the Tuesday evening salon and soon attracted visitors, meeting Stephen Townsend for the first time. Despite her busy schedule, Burnett felt ill from the heat and the crowds of tourists, spending protracted periods in bed. With her sons, Burnett moved on to spend the winter in Florence, where she wrote The Fortunes of Philippa Fairfax, the only book to be published in United Kingdom but not in the United States. That winter, Sara Crewe or What Happened at Miss Minchin's, was published in the United States. Burnett would go on to make Sara Crewe into a stage play and later rewrote the story into A Little Princess. In 1888, she returned to Manchester, where Burnett leased a large home off Cromwell Road, had it decorated, and then turned it over to cousins to run as a boarding house, after which Burnett moved to London, where she again took rooms, enjoyed the London season, and prepared Phyllis for production, a stage adaptation of The Fortunes of Philippa Fairfax. When the play ran, Burnett was disappointed by the bad reviews and turned to socialize. During this period, she began to see more of Stephen Townsend, whom Burnett had met during the Jubilee year.

In December 1890, Burnett's elder son, Lionel, died from consumption in Paris, which greatly affected her life and her writing. Burnett had sought a cure for her son from physicians, also taking him to Germany to visit spas. Following his death, before Burnett sank into a deep depression, she wrote in a letter to a friend that her writing was insignificant in comparison to having been the mother of two boys, one of whom died. At this time, Burnett turned away from her traditional faith in the Church of England and embraced a mix of Spiritualism, New Thought, Christian Science, and others without actually joining any particular church. Burnett returned to London, where she sought the distraction of charity work and formed the Drury Lane Boys' Club, hosting an opening in February 1892. Also during this period, Burnett wrote a play with a starring role for Stephen Townsend in an attempt to establish his acting career. After a two-year absence from her Washington, D.C. home, Burnett, her husband, and their younger son returned there in March 1892, where she continued charity work and began writing again. In 1893, Burnett published an autobiography, devoted to her elder son, titled The One I Knew Best of All. That same year, she had a set of her books displayed at the Chicago World Fair.

=== Divorce and move to Great Maytham Hall ===
Burnett returned to London in 1894, where she heard the news that her younger son Vivian was ill, so she quickly went back to the United States. Vivian recovered from his illness, but missed his first term at Harvard University. Burnett stayed with Vivian until he was well and then returned to London. At this time, she began to worry about her finances: Burnett was paying for Vivian's education; keeping a house in Washington D.C. (Swan had moved out of the house to his own apartment); and keeping a home in London. As she had in the past, Burnett turned to writing as a source of income and began to write A Lady of Quality. A Lady of Quality, published in 1896, was to become the first of a series of successful adult historical novels, which was followed in 1899 with In Connection with the De Willoughby Claim; and in 1901, she had published The Making of a Marchioness and The Methods of Lady Walderhurst.

When Vivian graduated from Harvard in 1898, Burnett divorced Swan Burnett. Officially, the cause for the divorce was given to be desertion, but in reality, Burnett and Swan had orchestrated the dissolution of their marriage some years earlier. Swan took his own apartment and ceased to live with Burnett so that after a period of two years she could plead desertion as a reason for the divorce. The press was critical, calling her a New Woman, with The Washington Post writing that the divorce resulted from Burnett's "advanced ideas regarding the duties of a wife and the rights of women".

From the mid-1890s, Burnett lived in United Kingdom at Great Maytham Hall—which had a large garden where she indulged her love for flowers—where she made her home for the next decade, although Burnett continued annual transatlantic trips to the United States. Maytham Hall resembled a feudal manor house which enchanted Burnett. She socialized in the local villages and enjoyed the country life. Burnett filled the house with guests and had Stephen Townsend move in with her, which the local vicar considered a scandal. In February 1900, she married Townsend.

=== Remarriage and later life ===
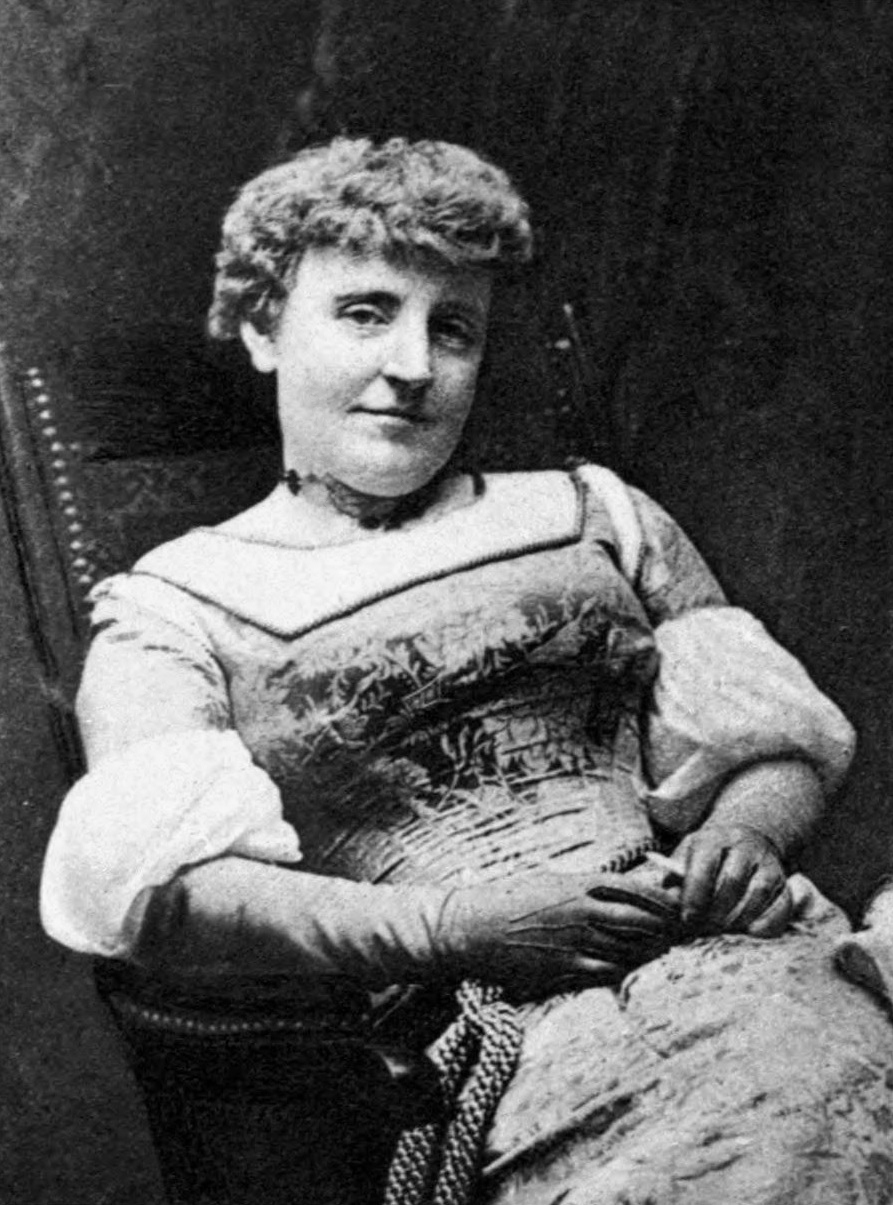
Burnett in 1901

The marriage took place in Genoa, Italy, and the couple went to Pegli for their honeymoon, where they endured two weeks of steady rain. Burnett's biographer Gretchen Gerzina writes of the marriage, "it was the biggest mistake of her life". The press stressed the age difference—Townsend was ten years younger than she—and she referred to him as her secretary. Biographer Ann Thwaite doubts Townsend loved Burnett, claiming that 50-year-old Burnett was "stout, rouged and unhealthy" and believes Townsend needed Burnett to help with his acting career, and support him financially. Within months, in a letter to her sister, Burnett admitted the marriage was in trouble, describing Townsend as scarcely sane and hysterical. Thwaite argues that Townsend blackmailed Burnett into the marriage, and he just wanted her money and to be in control of Burnett as a husband.

Unable to bear the thought of continuing to live with Townsend at Maytham, Burnett rented a house in London for the winter of 1900–1901. There, she socialised with friends and wrote. Burnett worked on two books simultaneously: The Shuttle, a longer and more complicated book; and The Making of a Marchioness, which she wrote in a few weeks and published to good reviews. In the spring of 1901, when she returned to the country, Townsend tried to replace her long-time publisher Scribner's with a publishing house offering a larger advance. In the autumn of 1902, after a summer of socialising and filling Maytham with houseguests, she suffered a physical collapse. Burnett returned to United States, and in the winter of 1902 entered a sanatorium. There, she told Townsend she would no longer live with him, and the marriage ended.

Burnett returned to Maytham in June 1904. Maytham Hall had a series of walled gardens, and she wrote several books in the rose garden; it was there Burnett had the idea for The Secret Garden, mainly written at the manor house in Buile Hill Park while visiting Manchester. In 1905, A Little Princess was published, after she had reworked the play into a novel. Once again, Burnett turned to writing to increase her income. Burnett lived an extravagant lifestyle, spending money on expensive clothing. It was reported in 1905 that Burnett was a semi-vegetarian. She had eliminated meat almost entirely from her diet.

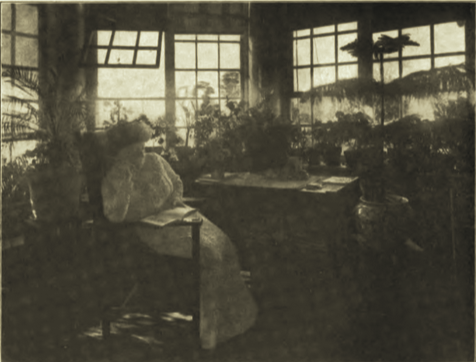
The Bookman, 1914

In 1907, she returned permanently to the United States, having become a citizen in 1905, and built a home, completed in 1908, in the Plandome Park section of Plandome Manor on Long Island outside New York City. Her son Vivian was employed in the publishing business, and at his request, Burnett agreed to be an editor for Children's Magazine. Over the next several years, she had published in Children's Magazine several shorter works. In 1911, Burnett had The Secret Garden published. In her later years, Burnett maintained the summer home on Long Island, and a winter home in Bermuda. The Lost Prince was published in 1915, and The Head of the House of Coombe and its sequel, Robin, were published seven years later.

Burnett lived for the last 17 years of her life in Plandome Manor, where she died on 29 October 1924, at age 74. Burnett was buried in Roslyn Cemetery next to her son Lionel.

== Reception ==
During the serialisation of Little Lord Fauntleroy in St. Nicholas in 1885, readers looked forward to new installments. The fashions in the book became popular, with velvet Fauntleroy suits being sold; other Fauntleroy merchandise included velvet collars, playing cards, and chocolates. Sentimental fiction was then the norm, and "rags to riches" stories were popular in the United States; in time, however, Little Lord Fauntleroy lost the popularity that The Secret Garden has retained.

Several of Burnett's novels for adults were also very popular in their day, according to the Publishers Weekly list of bestselling novels in the United States. A Lady of Quality was second in 1896, The Shuttle was fourth in 1907 and fifth in 1908, T. Tembarom was tenth in 1913 and sixth in 1914, and The Head of the House of Coombe was fourth in 1922.

Between 1886 and 1887, Burnett published a fairy tale titled The Story of Prince Fairy Foot in three installments of the American children's magazine St. Nicholas. A reader later pointed out that the tale had been plagiarised from Frances Browne’s The Story of Fairyfoot, published in the 1857 book Granny’s Wonderful Chair and the Tales it Told. Burnett apologised, explaining that she had remembered the story from her childhood but couldn’t locate the original book, which she had been given as a school prize. Her intention had been to write a series called Stories from the Lost Fairy-Book, retold by the Child who Read Them. Seventeen years later, in 1904—after the original work had fallen out of copyright—Burnett wrote an introduction for a new edition of Granny’s Wonderful Chair.

== Selected works ==
Advertisement of Burnett's works

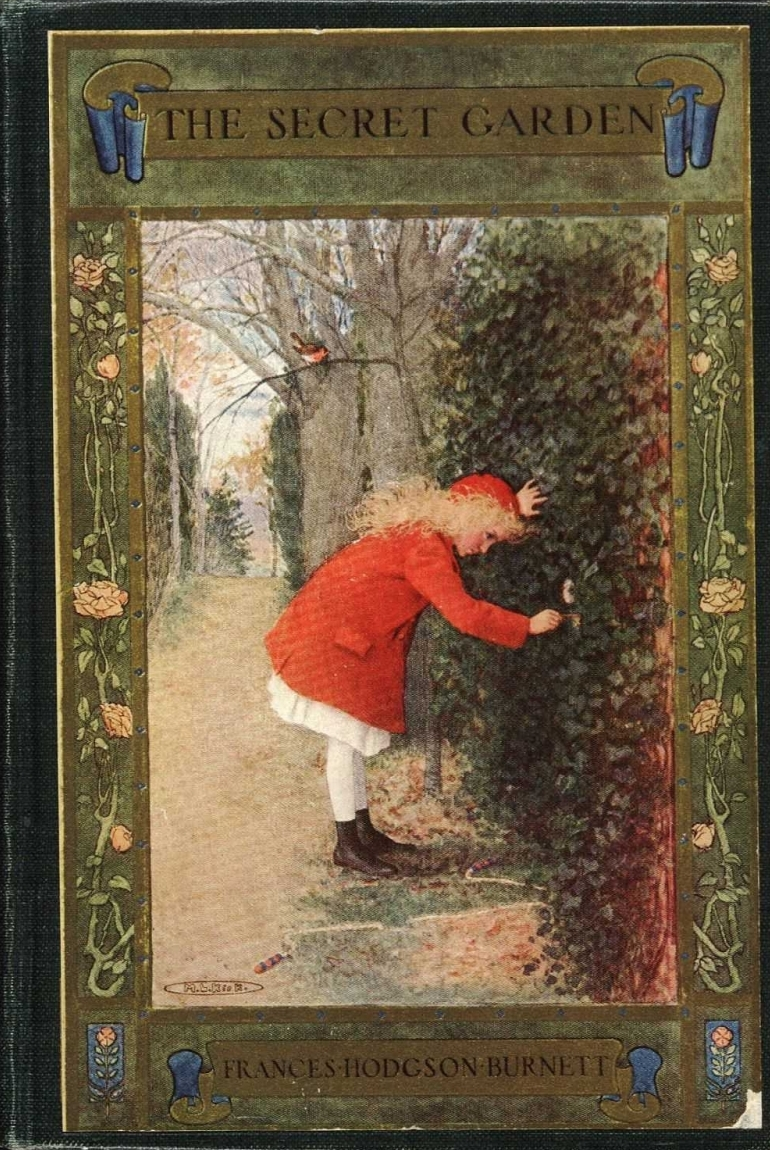
The Secret Garden (1911)

- That Lass o' Lowrie's (1877)
- Surly Tim (1877)
- Theo: A Sprightly Love Story (1877)
- Lindsay's Luck (1878)
- Haworth's (1879)
- Miss Crespigny (1879)
- Louisiana (1880)
- A Fair Barbarian (1881)
- Esmerelda (1881), with William Gillette
- Through One Administration (1883)
- Little Lord Fauntleroy (1886)
- Sara Crewe: or, What Happened at Miss Minchin's (1888)
- Editha's Burglar: A Story for Children (1888)
- The Fortunes of Philippa Fairfax (1888)
- The Pretty Sister of José (1889)
- The Drury Lane Boys' Club (1892)
- The One I Knew the Best of All: A Memory of the Mind of a Child (1893)
- Little Saint Elizabeth, and Other Stories (1893)
- Two Little Pilgrims' Progress. A Story of the City Beautiful (1895)
- A Lady of Quality (1896)
- In Connection with the De Willoughby Claim (1899)
- The Making of a Marchioness (1901), reprinted by Persephone Books
- A Little Un-fairy Princess (1902)
- In the Closed Room (1904)
- The Land of the Blue Flower (1904)
- A Little Princess: Being the Whole Story of Sara Crewe Now Told for the First Time (1905)
- Queen Silver-Bell (1906)
- Racketty-Packetty House (1906)
- The Dawn of A To-morrow (1905)
- The Shuttle (1907), reprinted by Persephone Books in 2007
- The Good Wolf (1908)
- The Secret Garden (1911)
- My Robin (1912)
- T. Tembarom (1913)
- The Lost Prince (1915)
- The Little Hunchback Zia (1916)
- The White People (1917)
- The Head of the House of Coombe (1922)
- Robin (1922) – sequel to The Head of the House of Coombe

== General sources ==
- Gerzina, Gretchen (2004), Frances Hodgson Burnett: the unexpected life of the author of The Secret Garden, Rutgers University Press, ISBN 0-8135-3382-1
- Hofstader, Beatrice (1971), "Burnett, Frances Hodgson", Notable American Women: 1607–1950, Cambridge: Harvard University Press
- Horvath, Polly (2004), "Foreword", Little Lord Fauntleroy, Simon and Schuster, ISBN 978-0-689-86994-5
- Rutherford, L. M. (1994), "British Children's Writers 1880–1914", in Laura M. Zaldman (ed.), Dictionary of Literary Biography, vol. 141, Detroit: Gale Research Literature Resource Center (subscription required)
- Thwaite, Ann (1991), Waiting for the Party: The Life of Frances Hodgson Burnett, 1849–1924, David R. Godine, ISBN 978-0-87923-790-5
