= 1936 in literature =

This article contains information about the literary events and publications of 1936.

== Events ==
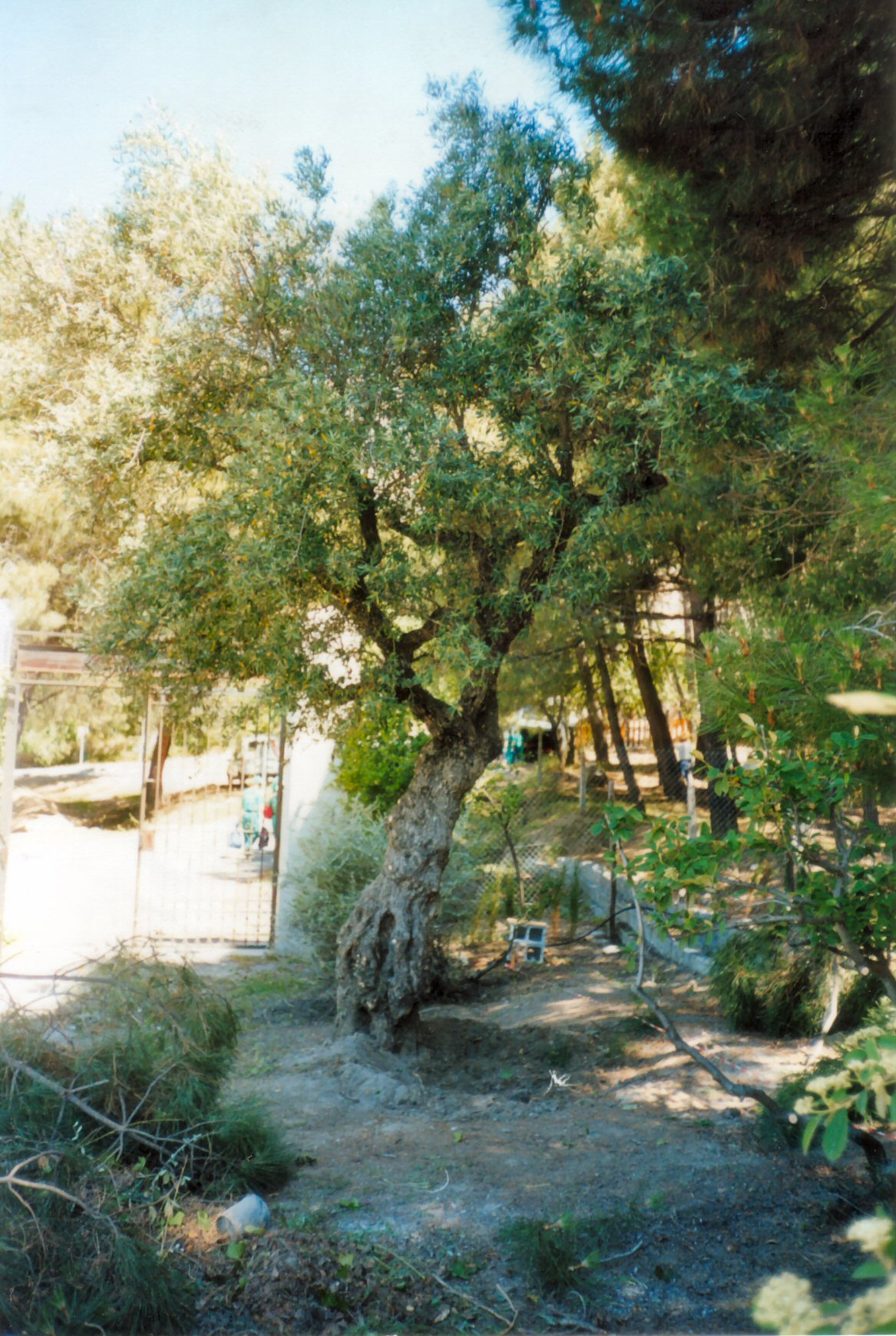
The olive tree near Alfacar where Federico García Lorca is executed on August 19

- January 8 – Jewish booksellers throughout Nazi Germany are deprived of their Reich Publications Chamber membership cards, without which no one can sell books.
- May – The Greek poet and Communist activist Yiannis Ritsos is inspired to write his poem Epitaphios (Epitaph) by a photograph of a dead protester at a massive tobacco workers' demonstration in Thessaloniki. It is published soon after. In August, the right-wing dictatorship of Ioannis Metaxas comes to power in Greece and copies are burned publicly at the foot of the Acropolis of Athens.
- May 16–17 – About 30 left-wing writers of the Second Polish Republic gather at the Lviv Anti-Fascist Congress of Cultural Workers.
- August 3 – George Heywood Hill establishes the Heywood Hill bookshop in London's Mayfair.
- August 18 – The 38-year-old Spanish dramatist, Federico García Lorca, is arrested by Francoist militia during the White Terror and never seen alive again. His brother-in-law, Manuel Fernández-Montesinos, the leftist mayor of Granada, is shot on the same day. Lorca's play The House of Bernarda Alba (La casa de Bernarda Alba), completed on June 19, will not be performed until 1945.
- November 6 – After United States publication in 1934, the U.K. authorities decide they will not prosecute or seize copies of James Joyce's 1922 novel Ulysses.
- November 23 – Life magazine begins to appear as a weekly news magazine in the United States, under the management of Henry Luce.
- unknown dates
  - The New Theatre, Sydney, in Australia, attempts to stage Clifford Odets' anti-Nazi drama Till the Day I Die; the German Consul General in the country complains to the Commonwealth Government and the play is banned; but the theatre stages the play in private premises.
  - The first lighthearted crime novel by Scottish-born university teacher of English literature J. I. M. Stewart, writing as Michael Innes, is published: Death at the President's Lodging, set in Oxford. It introduces his long-running character Detective Inspector John Appleby of Scotland Yard.
  - The Carnegie Medal for excellence in children's literature is inaugurated by the Library Association in the United Kingdom. The first winner is Arthur Ransome for Pigeon Post.

== New books ==
=== Fiction ===
- Felipe Alfau – Locos: A Comedy of Gestures
- Sutan Takdir Alisjahbana – Layar Terkembang (With Sails Unfurled)
- Jorge Amado – Sea of Death (Mar Morto)
- Eric Ambler – The Dark Frontier
- Arturo Ambrogi – El Jetón
- Nigel Balchin – Lightbody on Liberty
- Djuna Barnes – Nightwood
- Henry Bellamann – The Gray Man Walks
- Stephen Vincent Benét – "The Devil and Daniel Webster" (short story, published in The Saturday Evening Post)
- E. C. Bentley – Trent's Own Case
- Georges Bernanos – The Diary of a Country Priest
- Arna Bontemps – Black Thunder
- Mary Borden - Action for Slander
- Marjorie Bowen – The Poisoners
- Carol Ryrie Brink – Caddie Woodlawn
- John Bude – The Sussex Downs Murder
- Edgar Rice Burroughs – Tarzan's Quest
- James M. Cain – Double Indemnity
- Morley Callaghan – Now that April's Here and Other Stories
- Karel Čapek – War with the Newts (Válka s mloky)
- John Dickson Carr
  - The Arabian Nights Murder
  - The Punch and Judy Murders (as by Carter Dickson)
- Willa Cather – Not Under Forty
- Mihail Celarianu – Femeia sângelui meu (The Woman in My Blood)
- Louis-Ferdinand Céline – Death on the Installment Plan (Mort à crédit)
- Peter Cheyney – This Man Is Dangerous
- Agatha Christie – Hercule Poirot novels
  - The A. B. C. Murders
  - Cards on the Table
  - Murder in Mesopotamia
- Robert P. Tristram Coffin – John Dawn
- Freeman Wills Crofts
  - The Loss of the Jane Vosper
  - Man Overboard!
- Cecil Day-Lewis – Thou Shell of Death
- Warwick Deeping – No Hero–This
- Carmen de Icaza – Cristina Guzmán
- Henry de Montherlant – Les Jeunes Filles (The Young Girls; first part of tetralogy)
- John Dos Passos – The Big Money
- William Pène du Bois – Otto at Sea
- Daphne du Maurier – Jamaica Inn
- Walter D. Edmonds – Drums Along the Mohawk
- Mircea Eliade – Miss Christina (Domnișoara Christina)
- William Faulkner – Absalom, Absalom!
- Gilbert Frankau – Farewell Romance
- Konstantine Gamsakhurdia – Stealing the Moon (Georgian: მთვარის მოტაცება, romanized: mtvaris mot'atseba)
- Anthony Gilbert – Murder by Experts
- Jean Giono – Joy of Man's Desiring (Que ma joie demeure)
- Maxim Gorky (posthumous) – The Life of Klim Samgin (the final fourth volume, unfinishes, translated as The Specter)
- Graham Greene – A Gun for Sale
- Walter Greenwood – Standing Room Only
- Winifred Holtby – South Riding
- Aldous Huxley – Eyeless in Gaza
- Michael Innes – Death at the President's Lodging
- C. L. R. James – Minty Alley
- Mikheil Javakhishvili – A Woman's Burden (Georgian: ქალის ტვირთი, Qalis tvirti)
- Storm Jameson
  - None Turn Back (The Mirror in Darkness III)
  - In the Second Year
- Arthur Joseph – Dark Metropolis
- Margaret Kennedy – Together and Apart
- Leo Kiacheli – Gvadi Bigva
- Jonathan Latimer – The Lady in the Morgue
- Jean de La Varende – Leather-Nose (Nez-de-Cuir)
- Alexander Lernet-Holenia – Baron Bagge (Der Baron Bagge)
- Haniel Long – Interlinear to Cabeza de Vaca
- E. C. R. Lorac
  - Crime Counter Crime
  - A Pall for a Painter
  - Post After Post-Mortem
- Andrew Lytle – The Long Night
- Compton Mackenzie – Figure of Eight
- Klaus Mann – Mephisto
- Ngaio Marsh – Death in Ecstasy
- A. E. W. Mason – Fire Over England
- Alan Melville – Death of Anton
- Henry Miller – Black Spring
- Gladys Mitchell – Dead Men's Morris
- Margaret Mitchell – Gone with the Wind
- Naomi Mitchison – The Fourth Pig
- John A. Moroso – Nobody's Buddy
- Anaïs Nin – House of Incest
- George Orwell – Keep the Aspidistra Flying
- John Cowper Powys – Maiden Castle
- Theodore Pratt – The Big Blow
- Premchand – Godaan (Hindi: गोदान, Gōdān, The Gift of a Cow)
- Ellery Queen – Halfway House
- Ayn Rand – We the Living
- Erich Maria Remarque – Three Comrades (Drei Kameraden)
- Kate Roberts – Traed mewn cyffion (Feet in the Stocks)
- Rafael Sabatini – The Fortunes of Captain Blood
- Sim Hun – Sangnoksu (Korean: 상록수; Hanja: 常綠樹; "Evergreen (Tree)"; serialization concludes and book publication)
- Israel Joshua Singer – The Brothers Ashkenazi (Di brider Ashkenazy, in book format)
- Eleanor Smith – Portrait of a Lady
- John Steinbeck – In Dubious Battle
- Rex Stout – The Rubber Band
- Cecil Street
  - Death at Breakfast
  - Death in the Tunnel
  - In Face of the Verdict
  - Murder of a Chemist
- Phoebe Atwood Taylor
  - The Crimson Patch
  - Out of Order
- Frank Thiess – Tsushima
- Aleksey Tolstoy – «Золотой ключик, или Приключения Буратино» (The Golden Key, or The Adventures of Buratino)
- S. S. Van Dine – The Kidnap Murder Case
- Vũ Trọng Phụng – Số đỏ (Dumb Luck)
- Henry Wade – Bury Him Darkly
- Sylvia Townsend Warner – Summer Will Show
- Carolyn Wells – Murder in the Bookshop
- Ethel Lina White – The Wheel Spins (later The Lady Vanishes)
- Francis Brett Young – Far Forest

=== Children and young people ===
- Edward Ardizzone – Little Tim and the Brave Sea Captain (Journal d'un curé de campagne)
- M. E. Atkinson – August Adventure
- Carol Ryrie Brink – Caddie Woodlawn
- Joanna Cannan – A Pony for Jean (first of nine Pony series books)
- Noel Langley – The Tale of the Land of Green Ginger
- Munro Leaf – The Story of Ferdinand
- John A. Moroso – Nobody's Buddy
- Carola Oman – Ferry the Fearless
- Arthur Ransome – Pigeon Post
- Ruth Sawyer – Roller Skates
- Lester Basil Sinclair (as John Mystery) – Why Cows Moo
- Noel Streatfeild – Ballet Shoes (illustrated by Ruth Gervis)
- Barbara Euphan Todd – Worzel Gummidge (first in the Worzel Gummidge series of eleven books)
- Aleksey Nikolayevich Tolstoy – The Golden Key, or the Adventures of Buratino

=== Drama ===
- Pralhad Keshav Atre
  - Lagnāchi Bedi
  - Udyāchā Sansār
- W. H. Auden and Christopher Isherwood – The Ascent of F6 (published English edition)
- S. N. Behrman – End of Summer
- Charles Bennett – Page From a Diary
- Bertolt Brecht – Round Heads and Pointed Heads (Die Rundköpfe und die Spitzköpfe)
- Max Catto – Green Waters
- Noël Coward
  - Tonight at 8.30
  - Present Laughter
- Mazo de la Roche and Nancy Price – Whiteoaks
- Henry de Montherlant – Pasiphaé
- Harley Granville-Barker – Waste (first public performance, 1927 version; originally written 1906)
- Ian Hay – The Frog
- George S. Kaufman and Moss Hart – You Can't Take It with You
- Sinclair Lewis and John C. Moffitt – It Can't Happen Here (dramatisation)
- Federico García Lorca – The House of Bernarda Alba (La casa de Bernarda Alba; written)
- Clare Boothe Luce – The Women
- Barré Lyndon – The Amazing Dr. Clitterhouse
- Hugh Mills – Laughter in Court
- J. B. Priestley – Bees on the Boat Deck
- Terence Rattigan – French Without Tears
- Dorothy L. Sayers and Muriel St. Clare Byrne – Busman's Honeymoon: A Detective Comedy in Three Acts
- Irwin Shaw – Bury the Dead
- George Shiels
  - The Jailbird
  - The Passing Day
- Ödön von Horváth
  - Don Juan kommt aus dem Krieg (Don Juan Comes Back From the War)
  - Figaro läßt sich scheiden (Figaro Gets a Divorce)

=== Poetry ===
- W. H. Auden – Look, Stranger!
- Gottfried Benn – Ausgewählte Gedichte (Selected Poems)
- T. S. Eliot – Collected Poems 1909–35 including "Burnt Norton", first of the Four Quartets
- Patrick Kavanagh – Ploughman, and Other Poems
- Michael Roberts (ed.) – The Faber Book of Modern Verse
- Dylan Thomas – Twenty-five Poems
- W. B. Yeats (ed.) – The Oxford Book of Modern Verse 1892–1935

=== Non-fiction ===
- A. J. Ayer – Language, Truth, and Logic
- John Dickson Carr – The Murder of Sir Edmund Godfrey
- Victor Hugo Green – The Negro Motorist Green Book (1st edn)
- Graham Greene – Journey Without Maps
- Richard Foster Jones – Ancients and Moderns: A Study of the Background of The Battle of the Books
- Carl Gustav Jung – The Idea of Redemption in Alchemy (Die Erlösungsvorstellungen in der Alchemie)
- John Maynard Keynes – The General Theory of Employment, Interest and Money
- Osbert Lancaster – Progress at Pelvis Bay
- F. R. Leavis – Revaluation: Tradition and Development in English Poetry
- C. S. Lewis – The Allegory of Love
- Karl Mannheim – Ideology and Utopia
- Edwin Muir – Scott and Scotland
- George Orwell – "Bookshop Memories"
- Olavi Paavolainen – Kolmannen valtakunnan vieraana (Guest of the Third Reich)
- J. R. R. Tolkien – "Beowulf: The Monsters and the Critics" (version of a lecture)

== Births ==
- January 5 – Florence King, American writer (died 2016)
- January 10 – Stephen E. Ambrose, American historian (died 2002)
- January 28 – Ismail Kadare, Albanian novelist and poet (died 2024)
- February 12 – Shawkat Ali, Bangladeshi writer (died 2018)
- February 18 – Jean M. Auel, American historical novelist
- March 1 – Jean-René Huguenin, French novelist and literary critic (died 1962)
- March 2 – Gondoo U Thein Naing, Burmese writer (died 2025)
- March 7 – Georges Perec, French novelist, filmmaker and essayist (died 1982)
- March 28
  - Peter Mayer, English-born publisher (died 2018)
  - Mario Vargas Llosa, Peruvian writer, politician, journalist and essayist, Nobel Prize in Literature laureate (died 2025)
- March 29 – Judith Guest, American novelist and screenwriter
- March 31 – Marge Piercy, American poet and activist
- April 12 – Frankétienne, Haitian writer (died 2025)
- April 13 – Choi In-hun, South Korean writer (died 2018)
- April 30 – Viktor Likhonosov, Soviet Russian writer and editor (died 2021)
- May 10 – Anthea Bell, English translator (died 2018)
- May 23 – Ian Kennedy Martin, English scriptwriter and novelist
- May 27 – Ivo Brešan, Croatian playwright, novelist, screenwriter and satirist (died 2016)
- June 3
  - Duff Hart-Davis, English biographer and journalist
  - Larry McMurtry, American novelist, essayist and screenwriter (died 2021)
- June 9 – Nell Dunn, English playwright and author
- June 18 – Dick Wimmer, American novelist (died 2011)
- June 23 – Richard Bach, American novelist and non-fiction writer
- June 24 – J. H. Prynne, English poet (died 2026)
- June 29 – David Rudkin, English playwright
- July 5 – Valerie Flint, English medieval historian (died 2009)
- July 6 – Abidullah Ghazi, Indian-American author, educator and poet (died 2021)
- August 8 – Jan Pieńkowski, Polish-born British children's writer and illustrator (died 2022)
- August 24 – A. S. Byatt, English novelist (died 2023)
- August 27 – Philippe Labro, French writer, journalist and film director (died 2025)
- September 1 – Roderick Thorp, American novelist (died 1999)
- September 2 – Károly Krajczár, Hungarian Slovene teacher, writer and collector (died 2018)
- September 10 – Peter Lovesey, English crime fiction and short story writer (died 2025)
- September 20 – Andrew Davies, Welsh novelist and screenwriter
- September 26 – Victor Watson, English children's writer and academic
- October 1 – Kailayar Sellanainar Sivakumaran, Sri Lankan writer, art and literary critic, journalist and radio and TV personality
- October 5 – Václav Havel, Czech dramatist and first president of Czech Republic (died 2011)
- November 4 – C. K. Williams, American poet (died 2015)
- November 17 – John Wells, English satirical writer and actor (died 1998)
- November 18 – Suzette Haden Elgin, American science fiction writer (died 2015)
- November 20 – Don DeLillo, American novelist
- November 25 – William McIlvanney, Scottish novelist, short story writer and poet (died 2015)
- November 27 – Dahlia Ravikovitch, Israeli poet (died 2005)
- December 1 – Ma Văn Kháng, Vietnamese writer
- December 2 – Hebe Uhart, Argentine writer (died 2018)
- December 5
  - James Lee Burke, American writer
  - Lewis Nkosi, Zulu writer (died 2010)
- December 11 – Ingvar Moe, Norwegian poet, novelist and children's writer (died 1993)
- December 17 – Frank Martinus Arion, Curaçaoan novelist and poet (died 2015)

== Deaths ==
- January 4 – James Churchward, British writer (born 1851)
- January 5 – Ramón del Valle-Inclán, Spanish dramatist and novelist (born 1866)
- January 17 – Mateiu Caragiale, Romanian novelist and poet (stroke, born 1885)
- January 18 – Rudyard Kipling, English writer and Nobel laureate (born 1865)
- February 7 – Elizabeth Robins Pennell, American biographer and critic based in London (born 1855)
- February 8 – Rahel Sanzara, German dancer, actress and novelist (cancer, born 1894)
- February 23 – Lidia Veselitskaya (V. Mikulich), Russian novelist, memoirist and translator (born 1857)
- March 1 – Mikhail Kuzmin, Russian poet, musician and novelist (born 1872)
- March 9 – A. de Herz, Romanian playwright and journalist (hemoptysis, born 1887)
- March 16 – Marguerite Durand, French actress and journalist (born 1864)
- April 30 – A. E. Housman, English poet (born 1859)
- June 11 – Robert E. Howard, American fantasy writer (suicide, born 1906)
- June 12:
  - M. R. James, English ghost story writer and scholar (born 1862)
  - Karl Kraus, Austrian writer and journalist (born 1874)
- June 14 – G. K. Chesterton, English novelist, poet and Catholic apologist (born 1874)
- June 18 – Maxim Gorky, Russian dramatist (born 1868)
- July 25 – Donald Maxwell, English travel writer and illustrator (born 1877)
- July 26 – F. J. Harvey Darton English children's literature historian and publisher (born 1878)
- August 8 – Mourning Dove, Native American writer (born 1884)
- August 15 – Grazia Deledda, Sardinian-born novelist and Nobel laureate (born 1871)
- August 19 – Federico García Lorca, Spanish dramatist and poet (shot, born 1898)
- August 26 – Juliette Adam, French author (born 1836)
- October 5 – J. Slauerhoff, Dutch poet and novelist (born 1898)
- October 9 – Harriette A. Keyser, American industrial reformer (born 1841)
- November 12 – Stefan Grabiński, Polish horror writer (born 1887)
- December – Emma Sheridan Fry, American actor, playwright, and drama teacher (born 1864)
- December 10 – Luigi Pirandello, Italian dramatist and novelist (born 1867)
- December 24 – Frances Garnet Wolseley, 2nd Viscountess Wolseley, English horticulturist and garden writer (born 1872)
- December 27 – Kristína Royová, Slovak novelist, religious writer and poet (born 1860)
- December 28 – John Cornford, English poet (killed in action, born 1915)
- December 31 – Miguel de Unamuno, Spanish novelist, poet and scholar (born 1864)
- date unknown – Bertha M. Wilson, American playwright, critic and actress (born 1874)

== Awards ==
- Carnegie Medal for children's literature: Arthur Ransome, Pigeon Post
- James Tait Black Memorial Prize for fiction: Winifred Holtby, South Riding
- James Tait Black Memorial Prize for biography: Edward Sackville West, A Flame in Sunlight: The Life and Work of Thomas de Quincey
- Newbery Medal for children's literature: Carol Ryrie Brink, Caddie Woodlawn
- Nobel Prize in Literature: Eugene Gladstone O'Neill
- Prix Goncourt: Maxence Van Der Meersch, L'Empreinte de Dieu
- Pulitzer Prize for Drama: Robert E. Sherwood, Idiot's Delight
- Pulitzer Prize for Poetry: Robert P. Tristram Coffin, Strange Holiness
- Pulitzer Prize for the Novel: Harold L. Davis, Honey in the Horn
