= Trent's Last Case =

Trent's Last Case may refer to:

- Trent's Last Case (novel), a 1913 detective novel by E. C. Bentley
- Trent's Last Case (1920 film), a British silent crime film
- Trent's Last Case (1929 film), an American sound part-talkie Pre-Code detective film
- Trent's Last Case (1952 film), a British detective film
