= Moroso =

Moroso may refer to:

- 7724 Moroso, a main-belt asteroid, named after Pascuala Moroso and Rafael Villalobos
- Dick Moroso (fl. 1966–1998), American hot rodder, drag racer, and businessman
- John A. Moroso (1874–1957), American author
- Rob Moroso (1968–1990), NASCAR racing driver
