= Wayne Karlin =

American journalist

- Born: June 13, 1945 (age 81); Los Angeles, California
- Education: BA, Humanities; Master's, Creative Writing
- Alma mater: American College in Jerusalem; Goddard College
- Occupations: Author, editor, teacher
- Spouse: Ohnmar Thein Karlin
- Writing career
- Notable works: Rumors and Stones; Lost Armies

Wayne Karlin (June 13, 1945) is an American author, editor, and teacher. His books include The Genizah (2024), A Wolf by the Ears, Wandering Souls, Marble Mountain, War Movies: Journeys to Vietnam, The Wished-For Country, Prisoners, Rumors and Stones, Crossover, Lost Armies, The Extras, and Us.

== Early life, college and military career ==
Karlin attended White Plains High School, in New York and then served in the U.S. Marine Corps from 1963 to 1967, when he was honorably discharged with the rank of sergeant. His decorations include the Vietnam Service Medal, the Air Medal, a Presidential Unit Citation, and the Combat Air Crew Badge with three stars. He received a Bachelor of Arts degree in Humanities in 1970 from the American College in Jerusalem and his Master's degree in Creative Writing from Goddard College in 1976.

== Post-war and professional career ==
He retired as professor emeritus from the College of Southern Maryland, where he taught for over thirty years. He was also American editor of the Curbstone Press Voices from Vietnam series of books. That series includes The Other Side of Heaven: Postwar Fiction by Vietnamese and American Writers (1995), which he co-edited with Lê Minh Khuê and Truong Lu; The Stars, The Earth, The River: Short Fiction by Lê Minh Khuê (1997); Behind the Red Mist: Fiction by Hồ Anh Thái (1998); Against the Flood, a novel by Ma Văn Kháng (2000); Past Continuous, a novel by Nguyễn Khải (2001); The Cemetery of Chua Village and Other Stories by Đoàn Lê; (2005), Love After War: Contemporary Fiction from Viet Nam, co-edited with Hồ Anh Thái (2003), An Insignificant Family, by Dạ Ngân (2009), and Apocalypse Bell, by Hồ Anh Thái (2012), published by the Texas Tech University Press.

Karlin also adapted and edited In Whose Eyes, the memoir of the Vietnamese filmmaker Karlin was one of the script writers and served as a technical consultant and acted in the feature film Song of the Stork, a Vietnamese–Singaporean co-production, which won awards at several film festivals in Europe and Asia.

Karlin's short stories and essays have been widely anthologized and appeared in many literary magazines, including Glimmer Train, Indiana Review, Michigan Quarterly Review, North American Review, and Prairie Schooner.

== Personal life ==
Karlin lives in Saint Mary's County, Maryland, and was married for 44 years to Ohnmar Thein Karlin, who died in 2020. They have a son.
