= Action for Slander =

1937 film

- Directed by: Tim Whelan
- Written by: Ian Dalrymple; Miles Malleson
- Based on: Action for Slander by Mary Borden
- Produced by: Victor Saville; Alexander Korda; Stanley Haynes
- Starring: Clive Brook; Ann Todd; Margaretta Scott
- Cinematography: Harry Stradling
- Edited by: Hugh Stewart
- Music by: Muir Mathieson
- Production company: London Film Productions
- Distributed by: United Artists
- Release date: 21 January 1937
- Running time: 83 minutes
- Country: United Kingdom
- Language: English

Action for Slander is a 1937 British drama film directed by Tim Whelan and starring Clive Brook, Ann Todd and Googie Withers. The plot is about an army officer who is falsely accused at cheating at cards by a man whose wife he had an affair with and struggles to clear his name. It was an adaptation of the 1937 novel Action for Slander by Mary Borden.

== Plot ==
Major George Daviot is left by his wife Ann due to their growing estrangement and her knowledge that he has fallen in love with another woman, Josie Bradford, the wife of one of his fellow officers. Daviot goes off with friends for a weekend party at a country house attended by a number of prominent figures including businessmen and politicians as well as Captain Bradford and his wife. The tension between Bradford and Daviot is obvious during grouse shooting as Bradford is clearly aware of Daviot's affair with his wife.

That evening, during a game of cards played for high stakes, Daviot is accused of cheating by Grant, a drunken player who has lost large amounts of money, a charge that is dismissed out of hand by the other players until Bradford seconds it. None of the other players believe the accusation, even though they are unaware of the grudge that Bradford has against Daviot. Bradford sticks to his story, even in the face of legal action from Daviot.

The other guests frightened of their own reputations if the scandal becomes widely known, persuade all to hush the matter up. Daviot agrees to keep quiet for all their sakes, even though he still wants to clear his name. Daviot proposes to Josie that she leave her husband and live with him in spite of the scandal, but her lukewarm response leads him to realise that her interest in him is shallow. She subsequently reconciles with her husband and they go abroad to spend time together.

Daviot tries to continue, but rumours about the affair begin to spread. Over the following year, his life disintegrates. He no longer finds himself welcome in his regiment or at his gentlemen's club and his friends begin to cut him socially, including those at the house party who know him to be innocent. Hounded out of his society, Daviot retreats to a cheap boarding house in Bayswater where he ceases to go out or even open letters. His one remaining hope, of receiving a transfer to the Indian Army serving on the Northwest Frontier is dashed and he begins to consider suicide.

Ann Daviot, meanwhile, has been touring around Continental Europe aimlessly, possibly never to return to Britain. As soon as she hears he is in trouble she returns to help him, but he is unresponsive and derides her as an "Angel of Mercy". Eventually she goads him into facing his accusers, and he initiates court proceedings on the understanding that if he loses he will be allowed to take gentlemen's way out with a pistol. With the help of his barrister Sir Quinton Jessops, Daviot attempts to clear his name by suing Bradford and Grant for slander.

== Cast ==
- Clive Brook as Major George Daviot
- Ann Todd as Ann Daviot
- Margaretta Scott as Josie Bradford
- Arthur Margetson as Captain Hugh Bradford
- Ronald Squire as Charles Cinderford
- Athole Stewart as Lord Pontefract
- Percy Marmont as William Cowbit
- Frank Cellier as Sir Bernard Roper
- Anthony Holles as John Grant
- Morton Selten as Judge Trotter
- Kate Cutler as The Dowager
- Enid Stamp-Taylor as Jenny
- Francis L. Sullivan as Sir Quinton Jessops
- Felix Aylmer as Sir Eustace Cunninghame
- Laurence Hanray as Clerk of Court
- Gus McNaughton as Tandy
- Googie Withers as Mary
- Albert Whelan as Roper's butler
- Allan Jeayes as Colonel
- Pauline de Chalus as Polly
- Edward Lexy as Collins (Porter)

== Production ==
The film was made independently at Denham Studios by Victor Saville with backing from Alexander Korda's London Film Productions. It was adapted from the novel Action for Slander by Mary Borden that was released the same year.

== Reception ==
The film was popular at its release and it was re-released several times during the 1940s. However, it has later been criticised as "stilted". Rachael Low describes it as being "well-made and acted" although the "behaviour of the characters was too far-fetched to carry conviction".

Writing for Night and Day in 1937, Graham Greene gave the film a mildly good review, summarizing the film as "a picture of which we needn't feel ashamed if it reaches the United States, even though the story is novelettish in the extreme". Despite expressing the view that Selten had been "badly miscast" for the role of the Judge, Greene generally praised the cast's acting and the direction which allowed "people on the whole [to] behave naturally - and shabbily", and noted that the "love scene for once is not written in".

== Bibliography ==
- Low, Rachael. The History of British Film: Volume VII. Routledge, 1997.
- White, Terry. Justice Denoted: The Legal Thriller in American, British, and Continental Courtroom Literature. Praeger, 2003.
