= Nobody's Buddy =

1936 novel by John A. Moroso

- First edition cover
- Author: John A. Moroso
- Language: English
- Genre: Children's novel
- Publisher: Goldsmith Publishing
- Publication date: 1936
- Publication place: United States
- Media type: Print (Hardback & Paperback)
- Pages: 248
- OCLC: 7212218

Nobody's Buddy is an American children's novel written by John A. Moroso and published in 1936 by Goldsmith Publishing Co. of Chicago, Illinois.

== Plot introduction ==
First edition without Dust Jacket

Sweet story of a homeless boy and his dog, and their adventures with the circus and the local sheriff.
