= Trent's Last Case (1952 film) =

1952 British film by Herbert Wilcox

- British theatrical poster
- Directed by: Herbert Wilcox
- Written by: Pamela Bower
- Based on: Trent's Last Case by E.C. Bentley
- Produced by: Herbert Wilcox
- Starring: Michael Wilding; Margaret Lockwood; Orson Welles; John McCallum
- Cinematography: Mutz Greenbaum
- Edited by: Bill Lewthwaite
- Music by: Anthony Collins
- Production company: Imperadio Pictures
- Distributed by: Republic Pictures
- Release dates: 31 October 1952 (London); 2 February 1953 (UK)
- Running time: 90 minutes
- Country: United Kingdom
- Language: English
- Box office: £155,903 (UK)

Trent's Last Case is a 1952 British detective film directed by Herbert Wilcox and starring Michael Wilding, Margaret Lockwood, Orson Welles and John McCallum. It was written by Pamela Bower based on the 1913 novel of the same title by E.C. Bentley, which had been filmed previously in the UK with Clive Brook in 1920, and in a 1929 US version.

== Plot ==
A major international financier, Sigsbee Manderson, is found shot dead in the grounds of his Hampshire country estate. The Record newspaper sends its leading investigative reporter, Phillip Trent, to cover the story. Trent manages to get past the police cordon and speak to Inspector Murch, the detective leading the investigation.

At the inquest, John Marlowe gives evidence that Manderson gave him instructions to go to Dover to meet a man named George Harrison. Mr Manderson said he would travel with Marlowe as far as the golf course and walk back to the house for some exercise. That was the last time Manderson was seen alive. Marlowe claimed he continued on to his destination, but the police had been unable to trace Mr Harrison.

The coroner's verdict is suicide. Trent, however, is convinced it was murder and persuades his editor to let him pursue the story.

At first, Mrs Manderson gives Trent permission to investigate. John Marlowe prepares to leave and Mrs Manderson tells him they should not see each other again. Trent continues his investigations.

Mrs Manderson changes her mind and asks her uncle, Burton Cupples, to persuade Trent to stop investigating. Trent says his investigation is complete. Trent, by now in love with Mrs Manderson and aware of her husband's cruelty, visits Mrs Manderson and hands over his final report. He says he will leave it up to her whether to send the report on to his newspaper. She does not send it.

Several weeks later, at a concert in London, Trent meets Mrs Manderson. He tells her that suppressing the report has been a weight on his conscience. She says she understands, if he believes that she and Marlowe were lovers and Marlowe shot her husband. She tells him the truth: a week before her husband died, they had been due to go to the theatre, but her husband was delayed and John Marlowe took her to the theatre instead. During the evening, Mrs Manderson realised that Marlowe was in love with her, though she felt only friendship for him. When they returned home, Marlowe kissed her and she knows her husband saw them. She believes his jealousy drove him insane and that is why he shot himself.

Trent is not convinced. At a meeting with Burton Cupples and Marlowe, Trent outlines, in detail, the circumstantial evidence that indicated Marlowe murdered Manderson. Marlowe then explains to him why he is completely wrong.

It was true that Manderson had given Marlowe instructions to meet George Harrison. However, Manderson also told Marlowe he feared Harrison would not be in Dover, and that if he was not, Marlowe must continue on to Paris posing as Harrison to deliver an envelope. It was also true that Manderson did accompany Marlowe as far as the golf course. However, after Manderson exited the car, Marlowe had doubts. He opened the envelope Manderson gave him, and found money and diamonds. He realised that Manderson was framing him, and intended to ruin him. Marlowe turned the car around to have it out with Manderson, only to find him lying dead on the ground. Marlowe's gun lay beside him.

Knowing he would be the obvious suspect, Marlowe decided to give himself an alibi, by creating the impression that Manderson did not die till much later. He entered the house and impersonated Manderson's voice so the staff would hear him talking on the phone. He then continued on to Dover, though he knew it was a futile trip.

Trent believes Marlowe. It is assumed that Manderson killed himself with the intention of laying the blame on Marlowe. However, Burton Cupples later confesses that he encountered Manderson while out walking on the golf links that night. Manderson had the gun in his hand and a strange look in his eye. Cupples attempted to wrest the gun from him but it went off, killing Manderson. The pair had had an altercation in the hotel earlier that day, and Cupples feared he would be accused of killing Manderson deliberately because of it. So instead of contacting the police, he hurried back to the hotel and said nothing.

== Cast ==
- Michael Wilding as Phillip Trent
- Margaret Lockwood as Margaret Manderson
- Orson Welles as Sigsbee Manderson
- John McCallum as John Marlowe
- Miles Malleson as Burton Cupples
- Hugh McDermott as Calvin C. Bunner
- Jack McNaughton as Mr Martin, the butler
- Sam Kydd as Inspector Murch
- Henry Edwards as Coroner
- Geoffrey Bayldon as reporter in court
- Robert Cawdron as PC
- John Chandos as Tim O'Rielly
- Ben Williams as Jimmy, the reporter
- Kenneth Williams as Horace Evans, the junior gardener

== Production ==
The film was shot at Shepperton Studios. The sets were designed by art director William C. Andrews. Location shooting took place around London, Shepperton and nearby Chertsey.

Margaret Lockwood had just signed a contract with Herbert Wilcox who was better known for making films with his wife, Anna Neagle. Neagle and Lockwood were among the most popular stars in Britain in the 1940s, but Lockwood's career had been in a slump and this film was seen as a comeback. It was her first film in two years. It was to be the first of a six-picture deal between Wilcox and Republic although only three films resulted.

Herbert Wilcox claimed that he paid Orson Welles £12,000 for his role but because Welles was in so much debt the actor wound up with only £150. Wilcox and Welles worked together again on Trouble in the Glen (1954). Lockwood wrote in her memoirs that she adored working with Wilcox. She said "Orson is a genius and like most geniuses in my experience, sometimes a trifle off. His oddity, or so it seemed to me while making this picture, was that he wanted to play his love scenes with me entirely by himself; without me... I must say they were very successful."

In one scene, Eileen Joyce is shown playing part of Mozart's C minor Concerto, K. 491 at the Royal Opera House with an orchestra under Anthony Collins. It was the film debut of actor Kenneth Williams, best known for his roles in the Carry On comedy film series.

== Critical reception ==
The Monthly Film Bulletin wrote: "This is a weird hotch-potch of a film, incorporating all kinds of quaint film traditions – opera house scenes with the screen's first lady of the pianoforte, Eileen Joyce, Orson Welles in a sinister role of minor significance, lots and lots of dialogue where there should be silence, Miss Lockwood doing nothing (but with such dignity) etc. In addition, there is the conventional 'who-dunnit' story. The confusion of elements, however, shatters the shape of a film that might well have proved efficient entertainment had a simpler canvas been employed."

Variety wrote: "While the suspense is adroitly kept going and the climax has all the elements of surprise, the film suffers from an excess of wordage. All the characters talk too much, and do very little. ... Production is lavishly staged with expensive sets and attractive costumes for Margaret Lockwood. It is acted on a competent plane by a compact cast."

Leonard Maltin rated the film 2.5 out of 4 stars and noted "superior cast in lukewarm tale of the investigation of businessman's death."

== Bibliography ==
- Brady, Frank. Citizen Welles: A Biography of Orson Welles. University Press of Kentucky, 2023.
- Threadgall, Derek. Shepperton Studios: An Independent View. British Film Institute, 1994.
