= Ernst Weiss =

Austrian author (1882–1940)

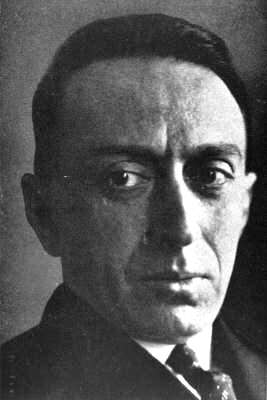
- Weiss before 1939
- Born: 28 August 1882; Brno, Moravia, Austria-Hungary
- Died: 15 June 1940 (aged 57); Paris, France
- Occupations: Novelist, medical doctor
- Writing career
- Language: German
- Notable work: The Eyewitness (Der Augenzeuge)

Olympic medal record

Art competitions
Silver medal – second place	1928 Amsterdam	Epic works

Ernst Weiss (German: Weiß; 28 August 1882 – 15 June 1940) was an Austrian medical doctor and author of Jewish descent. He is the author of Ich, der Augenzeuge ('The Eyewitness'), a novel dealing with the Hitler period.

== Biography ==
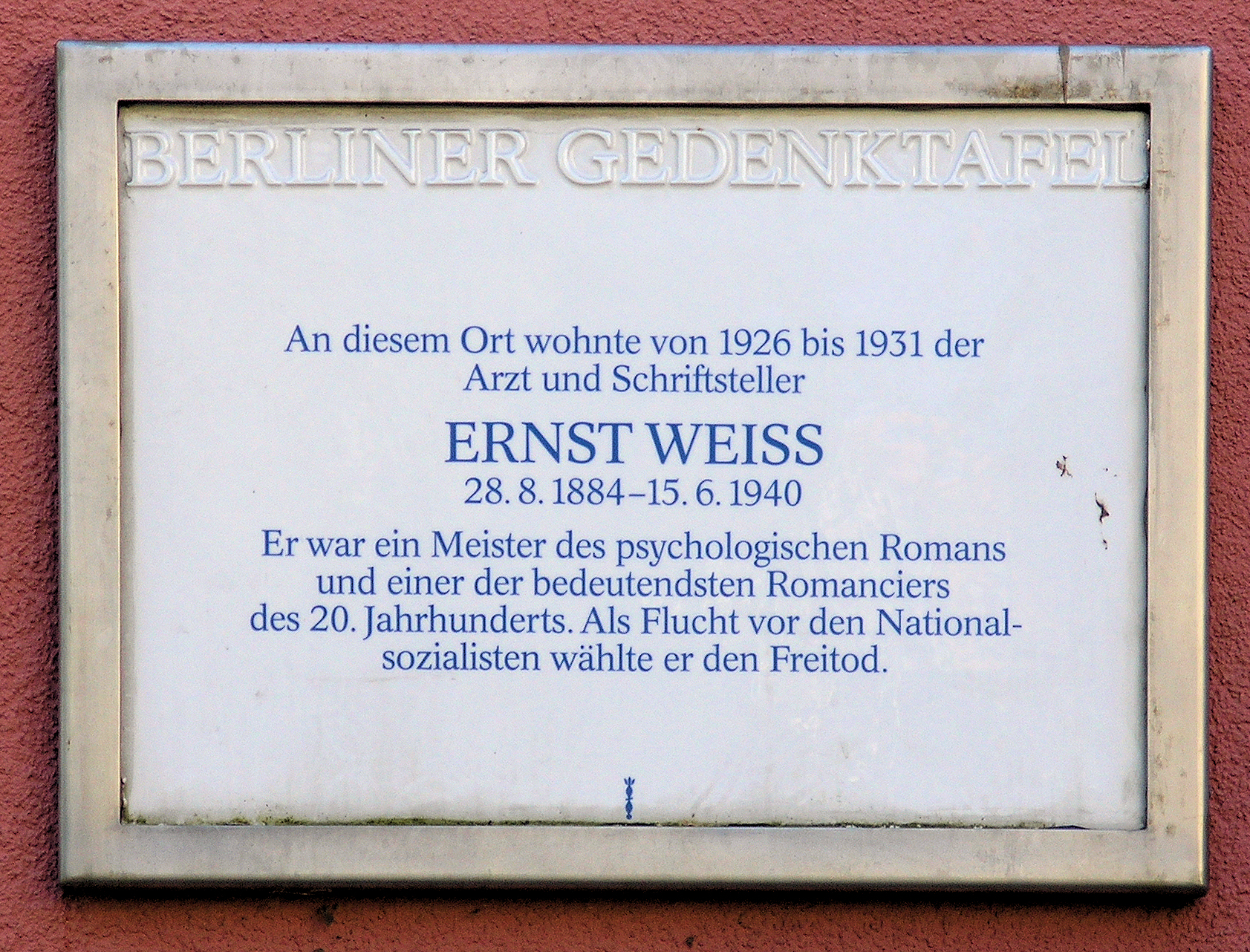
Memorial plaque on Luitpoldstraße in Berlin

Ernst Weiss was born on 28 August 1882 in Brno in Moravia, Austria-Hungary (now in the Czech Republic) to the family of a prosperous Jewish cloth merchant. After his father died when he was four, he was brought up by his mother Berta, née Weinberg, who led him to art. However, after completing his secondary education in Brno, Litoměřice and Hostinné, he came to Prague to study medicine. In 1908 he finished his studies in Vienna and became a surgeon. He practiced in Bern, Vienna, and Berlin but he developed tuberculosis and tried to recover as a ship doctor on a trip to India and Japan in 1912. In 1913 he met Rahel Sanzara, a dancer, actress and, later, novelist, and their relationship lasted until she died of cancer in 1936. In the same year he met Franz Kafka and they became close friends. Kafka wrote in his Diaries 1914: "January 2. A lot of time well spent with Dr. Weiss". Weiss was in touch with other writers of the Prague Circle such as Franz Werfel, Max Brod, and Johannes Urzidil. In 1914 Weiss returned to Austria to start a military physician career. He served for the duration of World War I on the Eastern Front, ultimately earning a golden cross for bravery. After the war he lived in Prague, then the capital of Czechoslovakia. He gave up his medical career in 1920 when he finished working in a Prague hospital. In 1921 he moved to Berlin, and began his most prolific period of writing, publishing nearly a novel a year. This period came to an end when, in 1933, he returned to Prague to care for his dying mother. He could not enter Nazi Germany and so he left for Paris in 1934. There he lived a poor life dependent on help from authors such as Thomas Mann and Stefan Zweig. He applied for, but did not receive, a grant from the American guild for German cultural freedom.

Weiss's last novel, The Eyewitness, written in 1938, describes a young German veteran of World War I, identified as "A.H.," who has been sent to a military hospital because he is suffering from hysterical blindness (now termed conversion disorder). The character is evidently modeled on Adolf Hitler, who was indeed treated for conversion disorder at a military hospital in Pasewalk, but scholars dispute to what extent the account is fictional. The writer Walter Mehring claimed in his autobiography that Weiss had access in Paris to Hitler's Pasewalk medical file, which had been sent out of the country for safekeeping by Edmund Forster, the psychiatrist who treated Hitler. The whereabouts of the file today are unknown, however, and the real Edmund Forster disapproved of hypnosis, the treatment used to cure "A.H." in Weiss's novel.

Weiss committed suicide on 14 June 1940 when German troops invaded the city. His attempt to deal with poison in his hotel room did not succeed immediately, but he died as a result only in the following night in a Paris hospital.

Based on thorough research on Hitler and his story at Pasewalk clinique psychologist David Lewis in his book The Man Who Invented Hitler tells also the story of Ernst Weiss and his book on Hitler using pseudonym A.H.

== Work ==
His work is influenced by Sigmund Freud, his friend Franz Kafka, and authors of then-modern literary Expressionism. He often hints at medical cases and ethics in his novels and stories.

- Die Galeere (1913); rejected by twenty-three publishers; Franz Kafka helped to edit it
- Der Kampf (1916) republished and mainly known today by the name 'Franziska'
- Tiere in Ketten (1918)
- Mensch gegen Mensch (1919)
- Stern der Dämonen (1920)
- Nahar (1922)
- Männer in der Nacht (1925)
- Boetius von Orlamünde (1928, retitled Der Aristokrat in 1966); awarded a silver medal in the literary competition at the 1928 Amsterdam Olympics and the Adalbert Stifter prize
- Georg Letham. Arzt und Mörder (1931)
- Der Geisterseher (1934)
- Der Gefängnisarzt (1934, reprinted 1969)
- Der arme Verschwender (1936, reprinted 1965)
- Der Verführer (1937).
- Der Augenzeuge (published posthumously in 1963); published as Ich, der Augenzeuge because of copyright proceedings about Alain Robbe-Grillet's Le Voyeur which was published under the same title
