= Nguyễn Khải =

Vietnamese writer

Nguyễn Mạnh Khải, known as Nguyễn Khải (3 December 1930 – 15 January 2008) was a Vietnamese author. Khải substantially rewrote and re-issued one of his early works, Cái Thời Lãng Mạn (Romantic Time 1987) as Tầm Nhìn Xa (Far Vision) after changing his mind about the views of small landholders.

== Works ==
- translated Past Continuous by Khải Nguyễn, Thanh Hao Phan, and Wayne Karlin 2001
