= Trent's Last Case (1929 film) =

1929 film by Howard Hawks

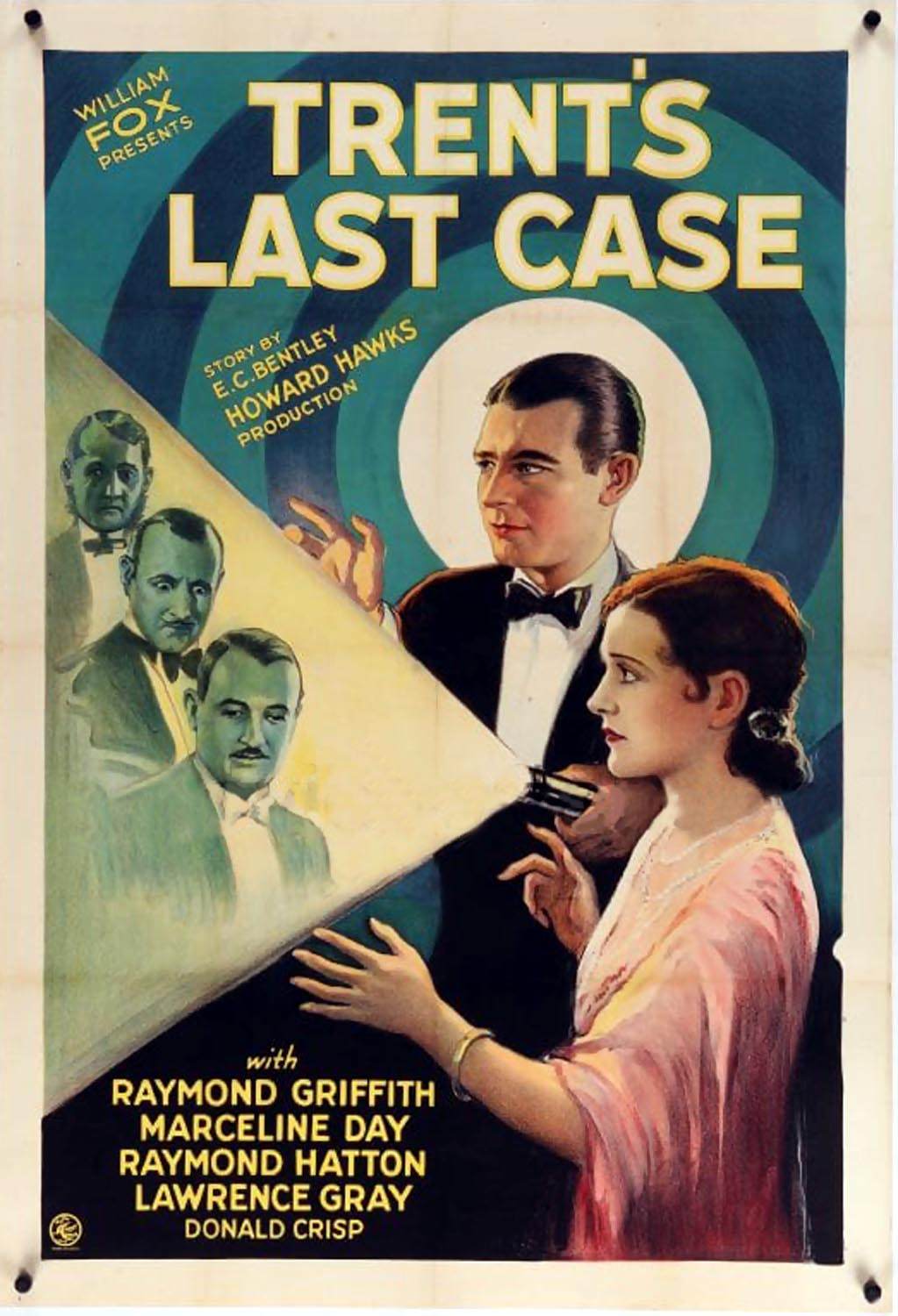
- Directed by: Howard Hawks
- Written by: W. Scott Darling; Malcolm Stuart Boylan; Beulah Marie Dix
- Based on: Trent's Last Case by E. C. Bentley
- Produced by: William Fox; Bertram Millhauser
- Starring: Raymond Griffith; Marceline Day; Raymond Hatton; Donald Crisp
- Cinematography: Harold Rosson
- Production company: Fox Film Corporation
- Distributed by: Fox Film Corporation
- Release date: March 31, 1929
- Running time: 66 minutes
- Country: United States
- Language: Sound (Synchronized) (English Intertitles)

Trent's Last Case is a 1929 American Synchronized sound Pre-Code detective film directed by Howard Hawks and starring Raymond Griffith, Marceline Day, Raymond Hatton, and Donald Crisp. It was released by Fox Film Corporation. While the film has no audible dialog, it was released with a synchronized musical score with sound effects using the sound-on-film Movietone process.

The film is based on the 1913 novel Trent's Last Case by British writer E. C. Bentley. A previous version starring Clive Brook was filmed in the UK in 1920 and released by Stoll Film Company.

== Premise ==
A leading financier is found dead at his home, leading amateur detective Philip Trent to investigate the case.

== Cast ==
- Raymond Griffith as Philip Trent
- Marceline Day as Evelyn Manderson
- Raymond Hatton as Joshua Cupples
- Donald Crisp as Sigsbee Manderson
- Lawrence Gray as Jack Marlowe
- Nicholas Soussanin as Martin
- Anita Garvin as Ottilie Dunois
- Edgar Kennedy as Inspector Murch

== Preservation status ==
According to Silent Era, a print exists. An incomplete print is held by the Library of Congress.

== See also ==
- Trent's Last Case (1952)
- List of early sound feature films (1926–1929)
