= Mary Borden =

American-British novelist and poet (1886–1968)

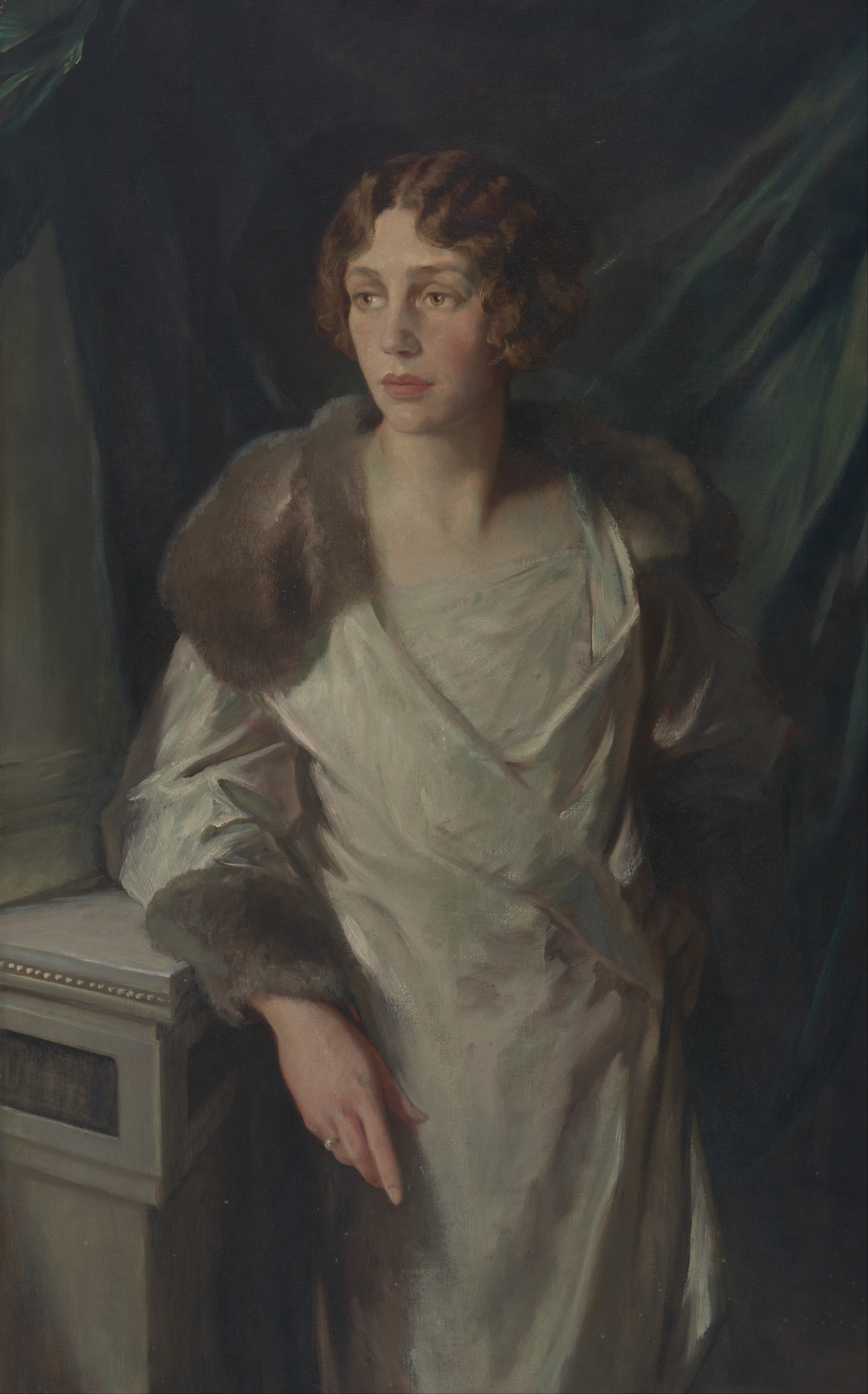
- Born: May 15, 1886; Chicago, Illinois, US
- Died: December 2, 1968 (aged 82); Warfield, Berkshire, UK
- Occupations: Novelist, poet

Mary Borden (May 15, 1886 – December 2, 1968) (married names: Mary Turner; Mary Spears, Lady Spears; pseud. Bridget Maclagan) was an American-British novelist and poet whose work drew on her experiences as a war nurse.

== Family background and early life ==
Mary Borden, known as May to her friends and family, was born into a wealthy Chicago family. She was the second of four children of Mary DeGarmo Whiting Borden and William Borden, who had made a fortune in Colorado silver mining in the late 1870s. Her brother, William Whiting Borden, became well known in conservative Christian circles for his evangelistic zeal and early death while preparing to become a missionary. Mary attended Vassar College, graduating with an AB in 1907. On a tour of the Far East, she met and married Scottish missionary George Douglas Turner, with whom she had three daughters; Joyce (born 1909), Comfort (born 1910), and Mary (born 1914).

In 1913, she and Turner moved to England, where Borden joined the Suffragette movement. She was arrested during a demonstration in Parliament Square for throwing a stone through the window of His Majesty's Treasury. She spent five days in police cells until her husband bailed her.

== World War I and nursing ==
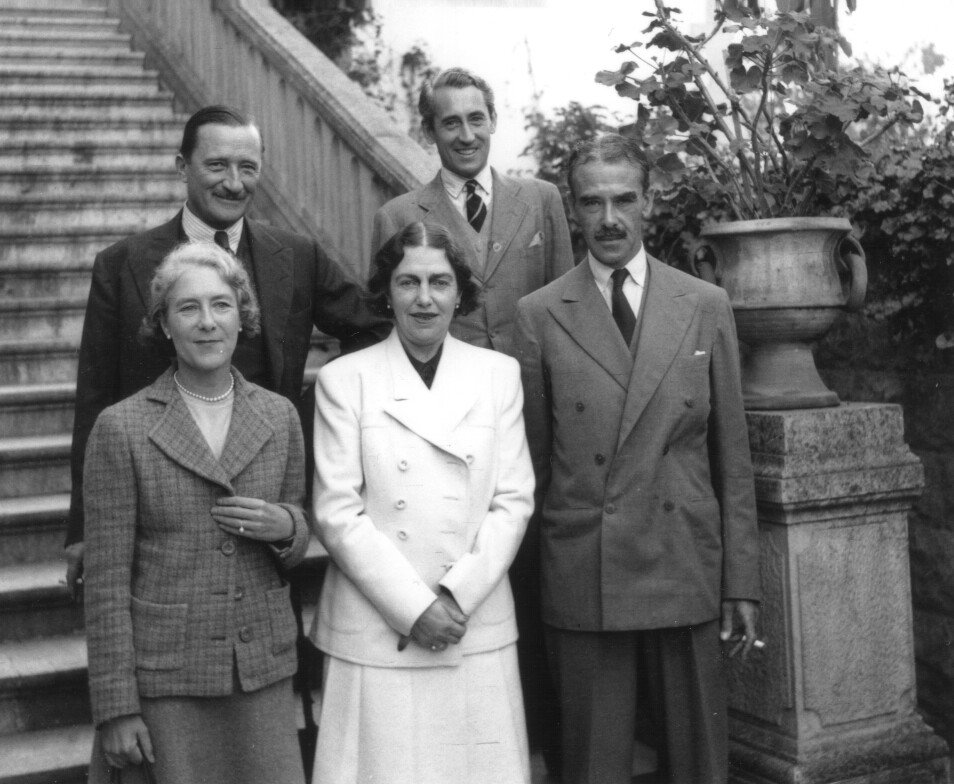
May Borden (center) with Sir Edward Spears (back row, left).

At the outbreak of the First World War in 1914, she used her own considerable money to equip and staff a field hospital for French soldiers close to the Western Front in which she served as a nurse from 1914 until the end of the war, see Voluntary Aid Detachment. There she met Brigadier General Edward Louis Spears, with whom she engaged in an affair at the Front. Her husband separated from her and took custody of their children. Following the dissolution of her marriage, she married Spears in 1918.

== Writing ==
During her wartime experience, she wrote poetry such as "The Song of the Mud" (1917). Notably, her work includes a striking set of sketches and short stories, The Forbidden Zone (1929), which was published in the same year as A Farewell to Arms, Good-Bye to All That and All Quiet on the Western Front but seems more akin to the modernist writings of her contemporaries Ezra Pound, Gertrude Stein or Edith Sitwell. Like many writers of the time, Borden reached for new techniques and forms to describe the unprecedented scale and impact of a global conflict. Contemporary readers were disturbed by the graphic – sometimes hallucinatory – quality of her work, coming as it did from a woman with first-hand experience of life on the front line. A present-day editor of her work, Paul O'Prey, contends that Borden is

“the great forgotten voice of the war – the outstanding female voice of the first world war. Her poetry can stand alongside anything."

The Forbidden Zone is a fictionalised and experimental memoir which mixes prose and poetry to give an account of Borden's experience during the war. Researcher Ariela Freedman describes it thus:

It is one of the most powerful and one of the most experimental pieces of writing to have emerged from the war. Although Borden's preface asserts the truth of her account, her method is more imagistic than documentary. Indeed, she wrote a surreal memoir about the war during a period when most war memoirs were written as conventional autobiographies. Neither a record nor a chronicle, nor, like May Sinclair's, a series of impressions, her war memoir attempted to register the impact of World War I through innovative aesthetic strategies. Borden mixes the genres of essay, fiction, and poetry, and blurs the lines between documentary and fiction. Beginning with the unfocused, muddy fields of Belgium, she portrays war as a series of phantasmic dislocations, an apocalyptic landscape marked by the posthuman incursion of the war machine. She describes the men and women of the war as displaced inhabitants of a strange, hallucinated world where people are reduced to bodies and functions.

The Forbidden Zone contains five long poems that describe what she saw and did working in the military hospital, which are full of passionate energy and compassion. O'Prey finds them reminiscent of Walt Whitman who also tended to the wounded on the battlefield, in his case during the American Civil War.

Borden's poetry on the war and about her affair with Spears, were not published in book form until 2015, one hundred years after they were written. Mary Borden, Poems of Love and War, edited by Paul O'Prey, was published in London by Dare-Gale Press, distributed by the University of Chicago Press in the US. Her war poems were slowly recognized but now feature in several modern First World War poetry anthologies.

Her 1937 novel Action for Slander was adapted into a film the same year.

== World War II ==
Living in England between the wars, Borden was drawn back to France in the expectation of mounting some sort of aid facility similar to the one she had run in the first war. With funds donated by Sir Robert Hadfield via his wife, Lady Hadfield, she set up the Hadfield-Spears Ambulance Unit, which worked across Europe and the Middle East. Journey Down a Blind Alley, published on her return to Paris in 1946, records the history of the unit, and her disillusion with the perceived failure of the French to put up effective resistance to the German invasion and occupation.

A first-person account of Lady Spears and the Hadfield-Spears Ambulance Unit can be found in the memoirs of Hermione, Countess of Ranfurly, To War with Whitaker.

== Later life ==
In her later life, she often returned to the United States and assisted her nephew-in-law Adlai Stevenson II in his run for the presidency, even writing some of his speeches.

She died on 2 December 1968 at age eighty-two in Warfield, Berkshire in England. Her grave can be found at St Michael the Archangel Churchyard.

== Centenary of the First World War Armistice ==
In November 2018 the Tower of London created an installation to commemorate the centenary of the ending of the First World War, called Beyond the Deepening Shadow: The Tower Remembers. This saw the moat filled with thousands of tiny flames and a soundscape composed by Mira Calix which is a choral setting of one of Borden's love sonnets written at the Somme for Louis Spears.

== Works ==
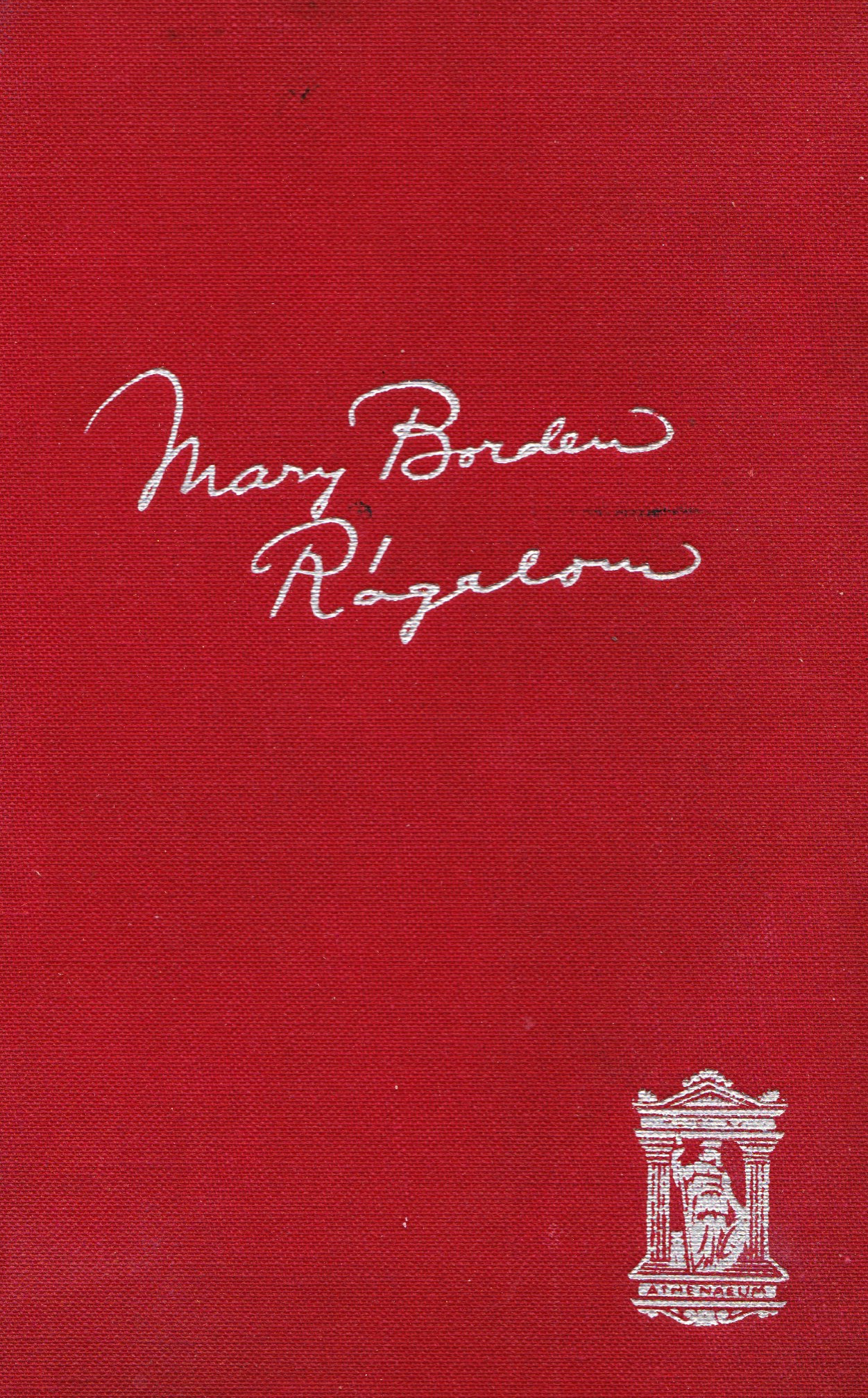
Slander (A Hungarian edition, 1930s)

- The Mistress of Kingdoms; or Smoking Flax by Bridget MacLagan (pseudonym) (1912)
- Collision by Bridget MacLagan (pseudonym) (play) (1913)
- The Romantic Woman by Bridget MacLagan (pseudonym) (1916)
- The Tortoise (1921)
- Jane – Our Stranger (1923)
- Three Pilgrims and a Tinker (1924)
- Four O'Clock and Other Stories (1926)
- Flamingo (1927)
- Four O'clock (1927)
- The Forbidden Zone (1929) OCLC: 1852756
- Jehovah's Day (1929)
- A Woman with White Eyes (1930)
- Sarah Gay (1931)
- Action for Slander (1937)
- The Woman I Love (1937)
- Black Virgin (1937), published in the U.S. as Strange Week-End (1938)
- Journey Down a Blind Alley (1946)
- You, the Jury (1952)
- Poems of Love and War (2015)
