= Electoral history of Adlai Stevenson II =

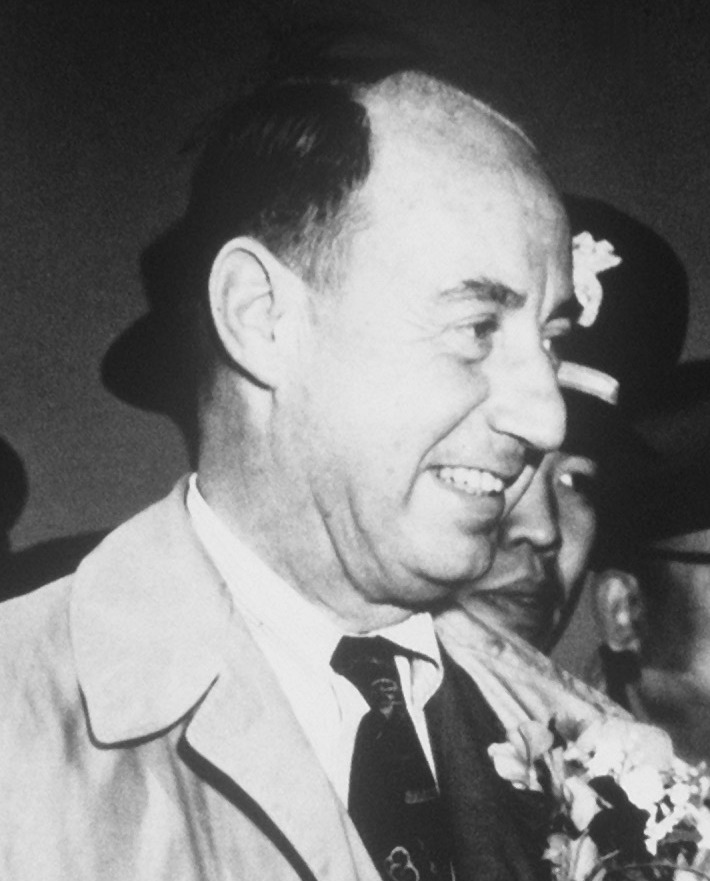
Stevenson circa 1953

Adlai Stevenson II served as governor of Illinois (1949–1953) and 5th United States ambassador to the United Nations (1961–1965), and was twice the Democratic Party's nominee for president of the United States, losing both the 1952 and 1956 presidential general elections to Republican Dwight D. Eisenhower.

Stevenson was elected as a Democrat in the 1948 Illinois gubernatorial election. In 1952, he had won his party's nomination to seek a second term as governor. However, he was nominated as his party's presidential nominee at the 1952 Democratic National Convention, being successfully drafted at the convention. As a result, Stevenson had to withdraw from the gubernatorial election in order to run for president. Stevenson and his running mate John Sparkman lost the presidential election to the Republican ticket of Dwight D. Eisenhower and Richard Nixon.

In 1956, he successfully sought to again receive his party's nomination for president. He and his running mate Estes Kefauver lost to the Republican ticket of Eisenhower and Nixon.

At the 1960 Democratic National Convention, Stevenson launched a late effort to again receive his party's nomination, but this was unsuccessful, and John F. Kennedy was nominated for president instead.

== Gubernatorial ==
=== 1948 ===
1948 Illinois gubernatorial Democratic primary
Party	Candidate	Votes	%
Democratic	Adlai E. Stevenson	578,390	100
Total votes		578,390	100

1948 Illinois gubernatorial election
Party	Candidate	Votes	%
Democratic	Adlai E. Stevenson	2,250,074	57.11
Republican	Dwight H. Green (incumbent)	1,678,007	42.59
Prohibition	Willis Ray Wilson	9,491	0.24
Socialist Labor	Louis Fisher	2,673	0.07
Write-in	Others	12	0.00
Total votes		3,940,257	100

=== 1952 ===
1952 Illinois gubernatorial Democratic primary
Party	Candidate	Votes	%
Democratic	Adlai E. Stevenson (incumbent)	708,275	99.97
Write-in	Others	213	0.03
Total votes		708,488	100

== Presidential ==
=== 1952 ===
==== Democratic primaries ====
1952 Democratic Party presidential primaries:

- Estes Kefauver - 3,169,448 (65.04%)
- Pat Brown - 485,578 (9.97%)
- Richard Russell, Jr. - 371,179 (7.62%)
- Matthew M. Neely - 191,471 (3.93%)
- Robert J. Bulkley - 184,880 (3.79%)
- Hubert Humphrey - 102,527 (2.10%)
- Adlai Stevenson (write-in) - 81,096 (1.66%)
- Dwight Eisenhower (write-in) - 64,911 (1.33%)
- Harry S. Truman (inc.) - 62,345 (1.28%)
- Unpledged delegates - 46,361 (0.95%)
- Robert S. Kerr - 45,285 (0.93%)
- William O. Douglas - 29,532 (0.61%)
- W. Averell Harriman - 19,806 (0.41%)
- Jerome F. Fox - 18,322 (0.38%)

==== Democratic National Convention balloting ====
1952 Democratic National Convention presidential balloting
Ballot	1st Before Shifts	1st After Shifts	2nd Before Shifts	2nd After Shifts	3rd Before Shifts	3rd After Shifts	Unanimous
Estes Kefauver	300.5	340	362	361	279.5	275.5	-
Adlai Stevenson	248.5	273	329.5	324.5	613	617.5	1,230
Richard Russell Jr.	267.5	268	294	294	261.5	261	-
W. Averell Harriman	126	123.5	121.5	121.5	-	-	-
Alben W. Barkley	49.5	48.5	81	81	67.5	67.5	-
Robert S. Kerr	69	65	5.5	5.5	-	-	-
Paul A. Dever	37.5	37.5	30.5	30.5	0.5	0.5	-
G. Mennen Williams	40.5	-	-	-	-	-	-
Hubert Humphrey	26	26	-	-	-	-	-
J. William Fulbright	22	22	-	-	-	-	-
Brien McMahon	16	-	-	-	-	-	-
James E. Murray	12	12	-	-	-	-	-
Harry S. Truman	6	6	1	6	-	-	-
Oscar R. Ewing	4	4	3	3	3	3	-
Paul Douglas	3	3	3	3	3	3	-
William O. Douglas	0.5	0.5	-	-	-	-	-
Not Voting	1.5	1.5	1.5	1.5	2.5	2.5	-

==== General election ====
Electoral results
Presidential candidate	Party	Home state	Popular vote		Electoral vote	Running mate		
Presidential candidate	Party	Home state	Count	Percentage	Electoral vote	Vice-presidential candidate	Home state	Electoral vote
Dwight David Eisenhower	Republican	New York	34,075,529	55.18%	442	Richard Milhous Nixon	California	442
Adlai Ewing Stevenson II	Democratic	Illinois	27,375,090	44.33%	89	John Jackson Sparkman	Alabama	89
Vincent Hallinan	Progressive	California	140,746	0.23%	0	Charlotta Amanda Spears Bass	New York	0
Stuart Hamblen	Prohibition	Texas	73,412	0.12%	0	Enoch Arden Holtwick	Illinois	0
Eric Hass	Socialist Labor	New York	30,406	0.05%	0	Stephen Emery	New York	0
Darlington Hoopes	Socialist	Pennsylvania	20,203	0.03%	0	Samuel Herman Friedman	New York	0
Douglas MacArthur	Constitution	Arkansas	17,205	0.03%	0	Harry Flood Byrd Sr.	Virginia	0
Farrell Dobbs	Socialist Workers	Minnesota	10,312	0.02%	0	Myra Tanner Weiss	California	0
Other			9,039	0.02%	—	Other		—
Total			61,751,942	100%	531			531
Needed to win					266			266

=== 1956 ===
==== Democratic primaries ====
1956 Democratic Party presidential primaries:

- Adlai Stevenson II - 3,069,504 (50.70%)
- Estes Kefauver - 2,283,172 (37.71%)
- Unpledged delegates - 380,300 (6.28%)
- Frank J. Lausche - 278,074 (4.59%)
- John W. McCormack - 26,128 (0.43%)
- Dwight D. Eisenhower - 6,358 (0.11%)
- W. Averell Harriman - 3,368 (0.06%)
- Robert Meyner - 1,129 (0.02%)
- John F. Kennedy - 949 (0.02%)
- Harry S. Truman - 728 (0.01%)
- Stuart Symington - 402 (0.01%)
- Paul A. Dever - 207 (0.00%)
- Lyndon B. Johnson - 2 (0.00%)
- Others - 3,610 (0.06%)

==== Democratic National Convention balloting ====
1956 Democratic National Convention presidential balloting
Contender	Vote
Adlai Stevenson	905.5 (65.9%)
W. Averell Harriman	210 (15.31%)
Lyndon B. Johnson	80 (5.83%)
Stuart Symington	45.5 (3.32%)
Happy Chandler	36.5 (2.66%)
James C. Davis	33 (2.41%)
John S. Battle	32.5 (2.37%)
George Bell Timmerman	23.5 (1.71%)
Frank J. Lausche	5.5 (0.4%)

==== General election ====
Electoral results
Presidential candidate	Party	Home state	Popular vote		Electoral vote	Running mate		
Presidential candidate	Party	Home state	Count	Percentage	Electoral vote	Vice-presidential candidate	Home state	Electoral vote
Dwight David Eisenhower (Incumbent)	Republican	Pennsylvania	35,579,180	57.37%	457	Richard Milhous Nixon	California	457
Adlai Ewing Stevenson II	Democratic	Illinois	26,028,028	41.97%	73	Carey Estes Kefauver	Tennessee	73
(Unpledged electors)	(n/a)	(n/a)	196,318	0.32%	0	(n/a)	(n/a)	0
Thomas Coleman Andrews	States' Rights	Virginia	108,956	0.18%	0	Thomas Harold Werdel	California	0
Eric Hass	Socialist Labor	New York	44,300	0.07%	0	Georgia Olive Cozzini	Wisconsin	0
Enoch Arden Holtwick	Prohibition	Illinois	41,937	0.07%	0	Edwin M. Cooper	California	0
Farrell Dobbs	Socialist Workers	New York	7,797	0.01%	0	Myra Tanner Weiss	California	0
Harry Flood Byrd Sr.	States' Rights	Virginia	2,657	<0.01%	0	William Ezra Jenner	Indiana	0
Darlington Hoopes	Socialist	Pennsylvania	2,128	<0.01%	0	Samuel Herman Friedman	New York	0
Henry B. Krajewski	American Third	New Jersey	1,829	<0.01%	0	Anna Yezo	New Jersey	0
Gerald Lyman Kenneth Smith	Christian Nationalist	Michigan	8	<0.01%	0	Charles Robertson	Michigan	0
Walter Burgwyn Jones	Democratic	Alabama	—^{(a)}	—^{(a)}	1	Herman Eugene Talmadge	Georgia	1
Other			8,691	0.01%	—	Other		—
Total			62,021,328	100%	531			531
Needed to win					266			266

=== 1960 ===
==== Democratic primaries ====
1960 Democratic Party presidential primaries:

- John F. Kennedy - 1,847,259 (31.43%)
- Pat Brown - 1,354,031 (23.04%)
- George H. McLain - 646,387 (11.00%)
- Hubert Humphrey - 590,410 (10.05%)
- George Smathers - 322,235 (5.48%)
- Michael DiSalle - 315,312 (5.37%)
- Unpledged delegates - 241,958 (4.12%)
- Albert S. Potter - 208,057 (3.54%)
- Wayne Morse - 147,262 (2.51%)
- Adlai Stevenson - 51,833 (0.88%)

==== Democratic National Convention balloting ====
1960 Democratic National Convention presidential balloting
Candidate	Votes	Percentage
John F. Kennedy	806	52.89%
Lyndon B. Johnson	409	26.84%
Stuart Symington	86	5.64%
Adlai Stevenson	79.5	5.25%
Robert B. Meyner	43	2.82%
Hubert Humphrey	41	2.76%
George A. Smathers	30	1.97%
Ross Barnett	23	1.51%
Herschel Loveless	2	0.13%
Pat Brown	1	0%
Orval Faubus	1	0%
Albert Rosellini	1	0%
Abstentions	1.0	0.00%

== Maps ==
1952 presidential election

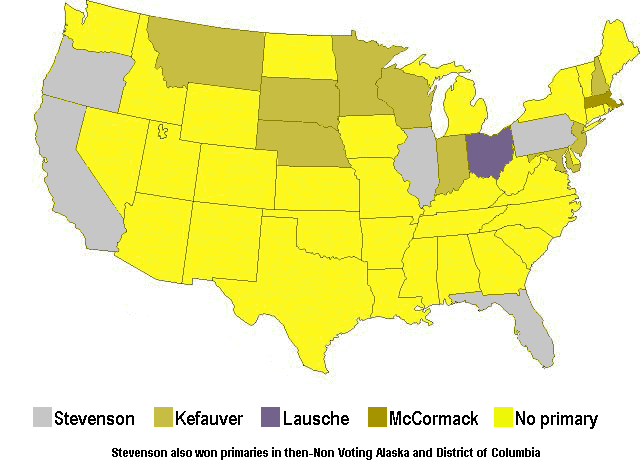
1956 Democratic presidential primaries

1956 presidential election
