= Arthur Joseph =

Welsh cricketer

Arthur Joseph (13 March 1919 – 2 January 2002) was a Welsh cricketer. He was a right-handed batsman and a leg-break bowler. He was born in the Neath Abbey area of Neath and died in Briton Ferry.

Joseph made a single first-class appearance for Glamorgan in 1946, and played for the Second XI between 1946 and 1951. Hampered by the War, Joseph could easily have made more than the one appearance he did, against Derbyshire. Joseph was an upper-order batsman for the Second XI, though in his single first-class match, he played slightly lower in the order, scoring just eight runs.
