= Lester Basil Sinclair =

Australian writer of songs and children's books

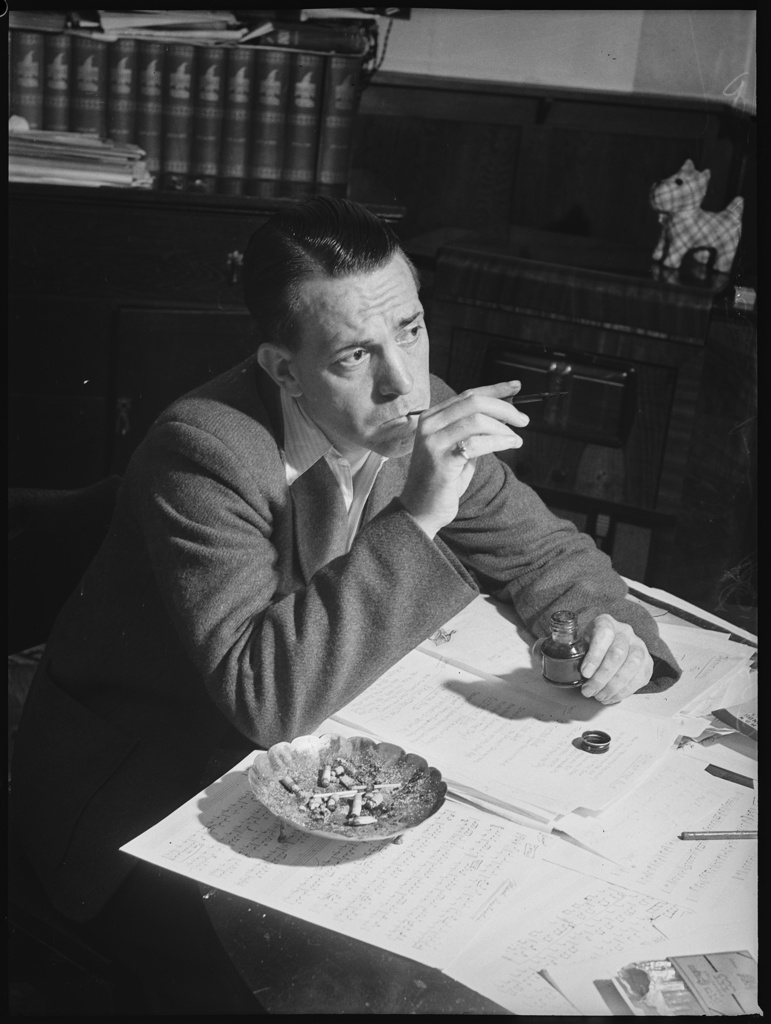
- Born: August 29, 1894
- Died: October 5, 1974 (aged 80)
- Other name: John Mystery
- Occupations: Author, songwriter

Lester Basil Sinclair (29 August 1894 – 5 October 1974) was one of the most prolific Australian songwriters during World War II. At the same time, Sinclair was an important Australian children's book author under the pen name John Mystery, publishing over 300 books. Sinclair was born in Yorkshire and emigrated to Australia as a teenager.

He built a turreted 'John Mystery's Adventure Castle' on the tip of the Illawong Peninsula in Sydney where he wrote many of his children's books. The mock castle no longer stands, but one of its ramparts serves as a castellated retaining wall on Cranbrook Place and several bas-relief sculptures remain in gardens on the same street.

== Bibliography ==
- Why Cows Moo, 28 pages. Lonsdale & Bartholomew, Sydney, 1936, (OCLC 216748223). Black and white illustrations by Matt Herriot.
