= Trent's Own Case =

1936 novel by Edmund Clerihew Bentley

- 1st edition
- Author: E.C. Bentley; H. Warner Allen
- Language: English
- Series: Philip Trent
- Genre: Detective fiction
- Publisher: Constable & Co.
- Publication date: 1936
- Publication place: U.K.
- Media type: Print
- Pages: 314
- Preceded by: Trent's Last Case
- Followed by: Trent Intervenes

Trent's Own Case is a 1936 British detective novel written by E. C. Bentley (in collaboration with H. Warner Allen) as a sequel to his best-known novel Trent's Last Case (1913).

== Plot ==
The artist and amateur criminologist, Philip Trent, investigates the murder of a sadistic philanthropist whose portrait he had painted. But there are many false paths and blind alleys in the case, and it is not until he has crossed to France and back again and searched England for the champagne Felix Poubelle 1884, not before two others have died and an actress has disappeared, that Trent finally emerges triumphant to discover the murderer.

== References to previous works ==
In Trent's Last Case, Philip Trent had fallen in love with one of the chief suspects, the victim's beautiful young widow, Mabel. In Trent's Own Case, they are happily married and have a six-year-old son. The reader gets a glimpse of their marriage in Chapter XV.

Herbert Warner Allen was best known as the author of several books on wine, such as the frequently reprinted The Romance of Wine (1932). However, he also wrote detective fiction featuring wine merchant and expert William Clerihew (apparently named in tribute to Edmund Clerihew Bentley): the short story "Tokay of the Comet Year" (1930) and the novel Mr. Clerihew, Wine Merchant (1933). William Clerihew makes a cameo appearance in Chapter XIII of Trent's Own Case, where, in his capacity as wine expert, he provides Trent with information that proves crucial to the solving of the case.

== Sequel ==
Trent's Own Case was followed by a collection of short stories, Trent Intervenes, published in 1938.

== Bibliography ==
- E.C. Bentley. The Complete Clerihews. House of Status, 2008.
