= M. E. Atkinson =

British children's writer (1899–1974)

Mary Evelyn Atkinson Frankau
- Born: Mary Evelyn Atkinson; 20 June 1899; London, England
- Died: 20 July 1974 (aged 75)
- Occupation: Novelist
- Years active: 1931–1961

Mary Evelyn Frankau, née Atkinson (20 June 1899 in London – 20 July 1974), writing as M. E. Atkinson, was a prolific English children's writer.

She was best known for her series on the Lockett family Series – children's adventure stories typical of the 1940s and 1950s, and written from a middle class viewpoint. Her Fricka series was mostly about ponies, and was generally viewed as only middling quality for the genre. Although never in the first rank of children's writers, she was especially good at creating un-stereotyped and interesting characters. Her earlier works were better received critically than her later works.

== Bibliography ==
=== One-act plays ===
- Here Lies Matilda 1931
- The Day's Good Cause 1935
- The Chimney Corner: A Play for Women in One Act" 1936*"T
- Beginner's Luck 1936
- Crab-Apple Harvest 1936
- Going Rustic 1936
- Can the Leopard? 1939

=== Lockett series ===
- August Adventure 1936
- Mystery Manor 1937
- The Compass Points North 1938
- Smugglers' Gap 1939
- Going Gangster 1940
- Crusoe Island 1941
- Challenge to Adventure 1942
- The Monster of Widgeon Weir 1943
- The Nest of the Scarecrow 1944
- Problem Party 1945
- Chimney Cottage 1947
- The House on the Moor 1948
- The Thirteenth Adventure 1949
- Steeple Folly 1950

=== Fricka series ===
- Castaway Camp 1951
- Hunter's Moon 1952
- The Barnstormers 1953
- Unexpected Adventure 1955
- Riders and Raids 1955

=== Other stories ===
- Horseshoes and Handlebars 1958
- Where there's a Will ... 1961
