= Edmund Clerihew Bentley =

English author (1875–1956)

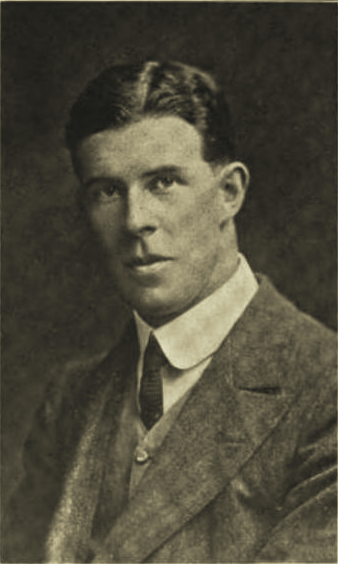
- Bentley in 1913
- Born: 10 July 1875; London, England
- Died: 30 March 1956 (aged 80); London, England
- Education: Merton College, Oxford
- Occupations: Novelist, humorist, poet
- Children: Nicolas Bentley
- Relatives: John Edmund Bentley (father)
- Writing career
- Genres: Biography, science fiction, poetry
- Notable work: Trent's Last Case

Edmund Clerihew Bentley (10 July 1875 – 30 March 1956), who generally published under the names E. C. Bentley and E. Clerihew Bentley, was an English novelist and humorist and inventor of the clerihew, an irregular form of humorous verse on biographical topics.

== Biography ==
Bentley was born in London and educated at St Paul's School and Merton College, Oxford. His father, John Edmund Bentley, was a civil servant but was also a rugby union international, having played in the first-ever international match for England against Scotland in 1871. Bentley worked as a journalist on several newspapers, including The Daily Telegraph. He also worked for the weekly The Outlook during the editorship of James Louis Garvin. His first published collection of poetry, titled Biography for Beginners (1905), popularised the clerihew form; it was followed by two other collections, More Biography (1929) and Baseless Biography (1939).

His detective novel Trent's Last Case (1913) was much praised, numbering Dorothy L. Sayers among its admirers, and with its labyrinthine and mystifying plotting can be seen as the first truly modern mystery. It was adapted as a film in 1920, 1929, and 1952. The success of the work inspired him, after 23 years, to write a sequel, Trent's Own Case (1936). There was also a book of Trent short stories, Trent Intervenes (1938).

From 1936 until 1949 Bentley was president of the Detection Club. He contributed to two crime stories for the club's radio serials broadcast in 1930 and 1931, which were published in 1983 as The Scoop and Behind The Screen. In 1950 he contributed the introduction to a Constable & Co omnibus edition of Damon Runyon's "Stories of the bandits of Broadway", which was republished by Penguin Books in 1990 as On Broadway.

He died in 1956 in London at the age of 80. His son Nicolas Bentley was an illustrator.

Phonographic recordings of his work "Recordings for the Blind" are heard in the film Places in the Heart, by the character Mr. Will.

G. K. Chesterton dedicated his popular detective novel, The Man Who Was Thursday, to Bentley, who was a school friend.

Although he is best known for his crime fiction and clerihews, Bentley also wrote at least one science fiction short story. This is the recently re-discovered "Flying Visit", published in the Evening Standard on 31 March 1953.

== Short prose works ==
=== Fiction ===
- "The Inoffensive Captain". The Strand Magazine, March 1914. Collected in Trent Intervenes (1938).
- "The Clever Cockatoo". The Strand Magazine, July 1914. Collected in Trent Intervenes (1938).
- "The Ordinary Hair-Pins". The Strand Magazine, October 1916. Collected in Trent Intervenes (1938).
- "The Sweet Shot". The Strand Magazine, March 1937. Collected in Trent Intervenes (1938).
- "The Old-Fashioned Apache". The Strand Magazine, May 1937. Collected in Trent Intervenes (1938).
- "Trent and the Vanishing Lawyer". The Strand Magazine, August 1937. Collected in Trent Intervenes (1938) as "The Vanishing Lawyer".
- "Trent and the Bad Dog". The Strand Magazine, September 1937. Collected in Trent Intervenes (1938).
- "Trent and the Genuine Tabard". The Strand Magazine, January 1938. Collected in Trent Intervenes (1938) as "The Genuine Tabard".
- "Trent and the Unknown Peer". The Strand Magazine, February 1938. Collected in Trent Intervenes (1938) as "The Unknown Peer".
- "Trent and the Ministering Angel". The Strand Magazine, November 1938. Collected in Trent Intervenes (HarperCollins Detective Story Club edition, 2017) as "The Ministering Angel".
- "The Public Benefactor". Magazine publication unknown. Collected in Trent Intervenes (1938).
- "The Little Mystery". Magazine publication unknown. Collected in Trent Intervenes (1938).
- "The Fool-Proof Lift". Magazine publication unknown. Collected in Trent Intervenes (1938) as "Trent and the Fool-Proof Lift".
- "Flying Visit". Evening Standard (London), 31 March 1953.

=== Non-fiction ===
- "Two Machines and a Party". Daily News (London), 7 November 1905.
- "Hearst for Governor". Daily News (London), 21 October 1906.
- "Naas". Daily News (London), 6 November 1906.
- Peace Year in the City, 1918–1919: An Account of the Outstanding Events in the City of London During Peace Year, in the Mayoralty of the Rt. Hon. Sir Horace Brooks Marshall, K.C.V.O., LL.D., Following the Great War of 1914–1918. London, 1920.
- "G. K.". The Listener, 17 June 1936.
- "Hitler Again Demonstrates His Pet Brand of Treachery". Ballymena Weekly Telegraph, 20 April 1940.
- "These Things Are Kept from the German Public". The Daily Telegraph, date unknown. Reprinted: Belfast Telegraph, 4 June 1940.
- "Next US President". The Daily Telegraph, date unknown. Reprinted: Belfast Telegraph, 27 June 1940.
- "The Lie as a Wartime Weapon". The Daily Telegraph, date unknown. Reprinted: Belfast Telegraph, 31 July 1940.
- "I Am Glad I Was Born When I Was". The Listener, 29 August 1940.
- "Nazi Propaganda in Last War". The Daily Telegraph, date unknown. Reprinted: Belfast Telegraph, 7 September 1940.
- "Boys and Girls of Yesterday and Today". The Listener, 12 December 1940.
- "The Interesting Age". The Listener, 16 December 1943.

=== Book reviews ===
- "Arabi's Side". Daily News (London), 10 June 1907.
- "The King's Serjeants". Daily News (London), 21 June 1911.

== Sources ==
- Binyon, T. J., Murder Will Out: The Detective in Fiction (Oxford, 1989), pp. 57–58. ISBN 0-19-219223-X
