= Rahel Sanzara =

German dancer, actress and novelist

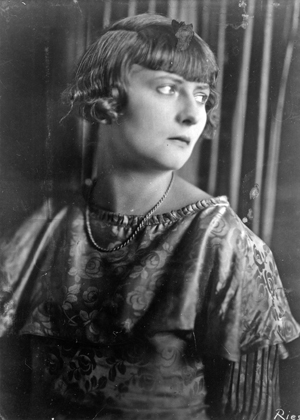
- Born: Johanna Bleschke; 9 February 1894; Jena, Saxe-Weimar-Eisenach, German Empire
- Died: 8 February 1936 (aged 41); Berlin, Germany
- Occupations: Novelist, dancer, actress
- Writing career
- Period: 1914–1933
- Notable work: Das verlorene Kind
- Notable awards: Kleist-Preis; 1926

Rahel Sanzara (also Sansara; pseudonym for Johanna Bleschke) (9 February 1894 – 8 February 1936) was a German dancer, actress and novelist.

== Biography ==
Johanna Bleschke was the oldest of a town musician's four children. After graduating from a school for 'higher daughters', she went into an apprenticeship as a bookbinder in Blankenburg. In 1913 she moved to Berlin, where she met physician and author Ernst Weiss. Their relationship lasted for more than twenty years, and she acted in productions of Weiss' dramas. After a short stint as a wartime nurse in 1914/15 she received an education as a dancer and launched a successful career. Since 1916 she also worked successfully as a film actress and received actress training from Otto Falckenberg in Munich, and found employment first in Prague, and from 1921 to 1924 at the Landestheater Darmstadt.

Her first novel Das verlorene Kind (The Lost Child) was published in 1926 and caused great controversy for its subject matter, the lust murder of a four-year-old girl by an older boy. The book, based on a real 19th century crime case and drawing from both the genres of the detective novel and the psychological drama received rave reviews. It quickly saw several editions and was translated into eleven languages. It is still in print and continues to sell well today. Rahel Sanzara was to be awarded the respected Kleist-Preis in 1926, but she turned it down. Her subsequent novels couldn't repeat her debut's success.

In 1927, Rahel Sanzara married the Jewish stock broker Walter Davidsohn, who emigrated to France to escape persecution from the Nazis, while she remained in Berlin, already weakened by cancer. She died in 1936 after a long illness.

== Literary works ==
- Das verlorene Kind (The lost child) (Novel 1926) ISBN 978-3-518-37410-8, LCCN 29022338.
- Die glückliche Hand (in: Vossische Zeitung March 1933; Novel, Zürich 1936) ISBN 978-3-518-37684-3
- Hochzeit der Armen (Novel, unpublished and lost)

== Filmography ==
- Der Fall Routt...! (1917)

== Secondary literature ==
- Orendi-Hinze, Diana. Rahel Sanzara. Eine Biographie (= Fischer 2258). Fischer Taschenbuch-Verlag, Frankfurt am Main 1981, ISBN 3-596-22258-3.
- Weidermann, Volker. Das Buch der verbrannten Bücher. Verlag Kiepenheuer & Witsch, Köln 2008, ISBN 978-3-462-03962-7 (Sanzara covered on pages 96–98).
- Hutton, Marcelline J. Russian and West European Women, 1860-1939: Dreams, Struggles, and Nightmares. Oxford: Rowman and Littlefield, 2001. 169-170.
