= 1952 Illinois gubernatorial election =

- November 4, 1952
- Turnout: 83.26%
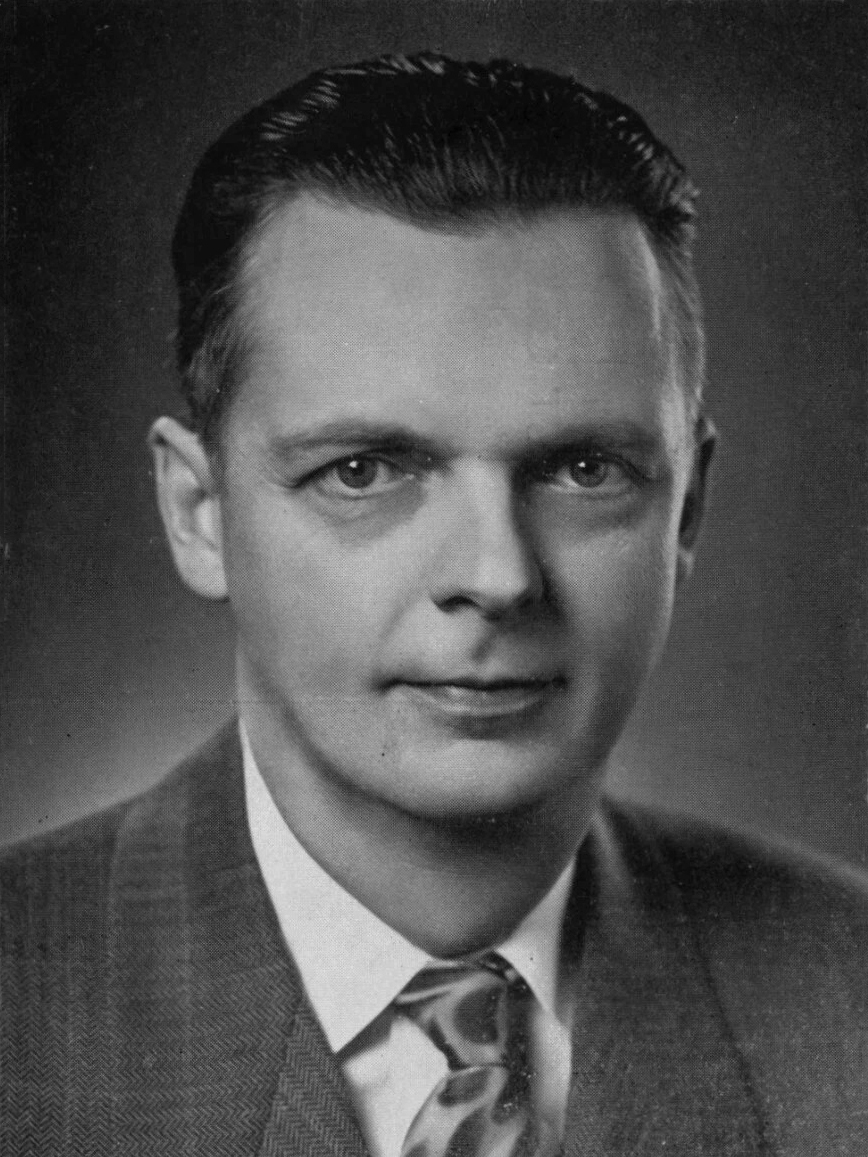

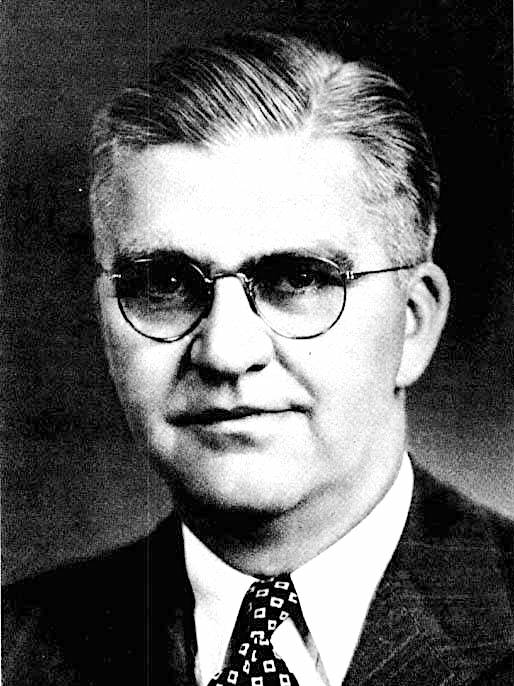
Nominee	William Stratton	Sherwood Dixon (replacing Adlai Stevenson II)
Party	Republican	Democratic
Popular vote	2,317,363	2,089,721
Percentage	52.48%	47.32%
- County results Stratton: 50–60% 60–70% 70–80% Dixon: 50–60% 60–70%
Governor before election
Adlai Stevenson II
Democratic
Elected Governor
William Stratton
Republican

The 1952 Illinois gubernatorial election was held on November 4, 1952.

Incumbent governor Adlai Stevenson II, a Democrat, ultimately did not seek a second term, instead opting to run as his party's nominee for President of the United States. Republican William Stratton was elected to succeed him in office.

Before receiving the Democratic presidential nomination at the Democratic National Convention, Stevenson had been running for reelection as governor, even winning the Democratic primary. He was replaced as Democratic nominee for governor by Lieutenant Governor Sherwood Dixon.

Stratton was considered to have ridden the coattails of Dwight D. Eisenhower's landslide victory in the state in the presidential election. After being elected, at the age of 38, Stratton became the youngest governor in the country, and the youngest to have served as governor of Illinois in seven decades.

The primaries and general election both coincided with those for federal offices (United States President and House, and those for other state offices. The election was part of the 1952 Illinois elections.

== Democratic primary ==
Gubernatorial Democratic primary
Party	Candidate	Votes	%
Democratic	Adlai E. Stevenson (incumbent)	708,275	99.97
Write-in		213	0.03
Total votes		708,488	100

== Republican primary ==
Gubernatorial Republican primary
Party	Candidate	Votes	%
Republican	William G. Stratton	716,300	56.13
Republican	Park Livingston	249,852	19.58
Republican	Richard Yates Rowe	226,444	17.74
Republican	William N. Erickson	68,851	5.40
Republican	Anthony A. Polley	14,753	1.16
Write-in		67	0.01
Total votes		1,276,267	100

== General election ==
Gubernatorial election
Party	Candidate	Votes	%
Republican	William G. Stratton	2,317,363	52.48
Democratic	Sherwood Dixon	2,089,721	47.32
Socialist Labor	Louis Fisher	8,777	0.20
Write-in		3	0.00
Total votes		4,415,864	100
