= Gondoo U Thein Naing =

Burmese writer and educator (1936–2025)

- သိန်းနိုင်
- Born: Thein Naing; 2 March 1936; Monywa, Burma Province, British India
- Died: 25 November 2025 (aged 89); Yangon, Myanmar
- Education: Mandalay University
- Occupations: Author; educator
- Writing career
- Pen name: Gondoo U Thein Naing

Thein Naing (Burmese: သိန်းနိုင်; 2 March 1936 – 25 November 2025), also known as Gondoo U Thein Naing (ဂုဏ်ထူးဦးသိန်းနိုင်), was a Burmese writer and educator. Professionally a high school Burmese-language teacher, he also received several National Literature Awards for his works on Burmese dance.

== Early life and education ==
Thein Naing was born on 2 March 1936 in Hsingyun Village, Monywa Township, Sagaing Division, to U Dhana and Daw Aye Sein. He passed the matriculation examination in 1955 with a distinction in Burmese—the only candidate to do so that year—and received a gold medal in Burmese from the Monywa District Department of Education. The following year, he was awarded The Poet Award by Thein Pe Myint, then-president of Myanmar Writers' Association. He began studying in the Burmese Department at Mandalay University in 1957, where he served as both secretary and president of the university pen club. During his university years, he won eleven first prizes in literary competitions.

== Career ==
After graduating from Mandalay University, Thein Naing was appointed a tutor at the University of Medicine, Mandalay. He also served on the executive committee of the Upper Myanmar Writers’ Association, later becoming its vice-president.

He resigned from his position as a lecturer at Mandalay Agricultural University and began working as a private Burmese-language tutor in 1968. Between 1972 and 1976, he commuted between Mandalay and Rangoon (now Yangon) to teach, travelling by plane.

In 1963, his book The History of Burmese Dance won the third prize at the National Literature Award for Myanmar Culture and Arts. In 1965, his work Burmese Marionette Dance received the second prize in the same category. His 1968 book Explanatory Works on Burmese Language is also regarded as an important reference for Burmese-language teachers and learners.

== Death ==
Thein Naing died in Yangon on 25 November 2025, at the age of 89.
