= Trent's Last Case (novel) =

Detective novel by Edmund Clerihew Bentley

- 1st edition
- Author: Edmund Clerihew Bentley
- Language: English
- Genre: Mystery, detective fiction
- Publisher: Nelson
- Publication date: 1913
- Publication place: United Kingdom
- Pages: 375 (hardcover 1st edition)
- Followed by: Trent's Own Case (1936)

Trent's Last Case is a whodunit detective novel written by E. C. Bentley and first published in 1913. Despite the title, it is in fact the first work in which its central character, the artist and amateur detective Philip Trent, appears: he subsequently reappeared in the novel Trent's Own Case (1936), and the short-story collection Trent Intervenes (1938).

The novel is a whodunit which is notable in detective fiction history because it is the first major send-up of that genre. Not only does Trent fall in love with one of the primary suspects – usually considered off-limits – he also, after painstakingly collecting all the evidence, draws all the wrong conclusions.

The novel was published as The Woman in Black in the United States, later in 1913.

== Plot summary ==
Sigsbee Manderson, a wealthy American plutocrat, is found shot dead in the grounds of his English country house. Philip Trent, an artist, freelance journalist, and amateur detective, is commissioned by Sir James Molloy, a Fleet Street press magnate, to investigate and report on the case. Trent receives the co-operation of the police – the investigating officer, Inspector Murch of Scotland Yard, is an old acquaintance – and is able to view the body, examine the house and grounds, and interview those involved. Other members of the household include Manderson's wife, Mabel; his two secretaries, Calvin Bunner, an American, and John Marlowe, an Englishman; Martin, a manservant; and Célestine, a lady's maid. Nathaniel Cupples, Mabel's uncle-by-marriage and another old friend of Trent, is staying at a hotel in the village.

Trent pursues his enquiries, and learns that the Mandersons' marriage was in difficulties and that the couple had grown distant from each other. In the course of his investigation, he falls in love with Mabel Manderson. The coroner's inquest finds that Manderson was killed by a person or persons unknown: the suggestion is that he was the victim of a business vendetta. Trent, however, concludes that Manderson was shot by Marlowe, who then returned to the house wearing some of Manderson's outer clothing in order to give the impression that Manderson was at that point still alive, before driving to Southampton to provide himself with an alibi. Trent believes that Marlowe's motive was his own love for Mabel, but is unclear as to how far she may have reciprocated in these feelings. He writes down his ideas in the form of a dispatch for Molloy, but before sending it presents it to Mabel and asks whether there had been anything between her and Marlowe. Her reaction persuades him that there had been, and he leaves the dispatch unsent.

Six months later Trent re-establishes contact with Mabel in London and finally extracts her version of events. She tells him that there had never been any sort of intimacy between her and Marlowe, but that her husband's suspicions had been the cause of their marital rift, and that in his jealousy he may have plotted an act of revenge. Trent sends Marlowe his original dispatch and arranges a meeting at which Cupples is also present. At the meeting, Marlowe explains that Manderson fabricated a web of incriminating evidence to implicate Marlowe in his apparent "murder" and then shot himself. Having realised what was happening, and having discovered Manderson's body, Marlowe had attempted to cover his tracks and give himself an alibi – this much of Trent's analysis had been correct.

Following this meeting, Trent and Cupples have dinner together, and Cupples reveals that while the majority of Marlowe's story had been accurate, it was in fact he who had fired the fatal shot. He had chanced upon Manderson pointing a pistol at himself, probably meaning only to cause a self-inflicted wound. Suspecting a suicide attempt, Cupples had intervened, and in the ensuing struggle had accidentally shot Manderson in the face.

The book ends with Trent vowing that he will never again attempt to dabble in crime detection.

== Reception ==
G. K. Chesterton, author of the Father Brown mysteries, felt that this novel was "The finest detective story of modern times". (Bentley and Chesterton were close personal friends, and Bentley dedicated the book to Chesterton.) The book was influential in the postwar "Golden Age" of detective stories: Agatha Christie called Trent's Last Case "One of the three best detective stories ever written". Dorothy L. Sayers wrote that "It shook the little world of the mystery novel like a revolution ... Every detective writer of today owes something, consciously or unconsciously, to its liberating and inspiring influence." It was still admired in the second half of the century; literary critic Jacques Barzun, co-author of A Catalogue of Crime (1971), included it in his top ten mystery novels, as did mystery novelists Reginald Hill and Peter Straub.

In his critique of the mystery genre, The Simple Art of Murder, Raymond Chandler said that it was frequently called "the perfect story" before ridiculing some plot points that he considered preposterous: "I have known relatively few international financiers, but I rather think the author of this novel has (if possible) known fewer."

According to Aaron Marc Stein in his introduction to the 1977 edition, published by University Extension of UCSD: "At the risk of bringing down on his memory the wrath of the Baker Street Irregulars it must be recorded that Bentley had reservations about even the Conan Doyle originals. He deplored the great detective's lack of humor and he was irritated by the Sherlockian eccentricities.... Bentley had the idea of doing a detective who would be a human being and who would know how to laugh."

== Adaptations ==
=== Film ===
The novel was adapted into a silent film directed by Richard Garrick in 1920. A second adaptation (released in both a silent version and a sound version) was made by Howard Hawks in 1929.

A third film adaptation was directed by Herbert Wilcox in 1952. It starred Michael Wilding as Trent, Orson Welles as Sigsbee Manderson, and Margaret Lockwood as Margaret Manderson (the equivalent of Mabel).

An excerpt of the book is recited in the film Places in the Heart (1984). The only part the audience hears is the opening line: "Chapter 1. Bad News. Between what matters and what seems to matter, how shall the world we know judge wisely?"

=== Television ===
The novel was adapted as an episode of the BBC anthology TV series Detective in April 1964, introduced by Rupert Davies as Maigret. It starred Michael Gwynn as Trent, Carleton Hobbs as Cupples, Bill Nagy as Bunner, Penelope Horner as Mabel Manderson, Kenneth Fortescue as Marlowe, and Peter Williams as Sigsbee Manderson.

=== Stage ===
The novel was adapted into a stage production by John Arden McClure, which premiered in January 2013 at the Broadway Onstage Live Theatre in Eastpointe, Michigan. It starred McClure as Trent, Daniel Woitulewicz as Cupples, Elizabeth Rager as Bunner, Stella Rothe as Mabel Manderson, Patrick John Sharpe as Marlowe, and Jack Abella as Sigsbee Manderson.

=== Radio ===
The novel was adapted for the BBC National Programme in January 1934. It was later serialised in 1950; and a further dramatisation was broadcast for the Home Service in 1963, starring Richard Hurndall. Another radio adaptation was broadcast on BBC Radio 4 in December 1986 with Martin Jarvis in the title role.

A radio adaptation starring Ronald Colman was aired on 7 December 1953 on the American radio show Suspense.

== Publication details ==
- 1913, UK, Nelson (ISBN NA), Pub date 1913, Hardback (1st edition)
- 1917, UK, Nelson (ISBN NA), Pub date 1917, Hardcover (4th edition)
- 2005, US, Kessinger Publishing, ISBN 1-84637-709-9, Pub date 31 October 2005, Paperback
- 2005, US, Echo Library, ISBN 978-1-84637-709-9, October 2005, Paperback
