= Károly Krajczár =

Hungarian Slovene teacher and writer (1936–2018)

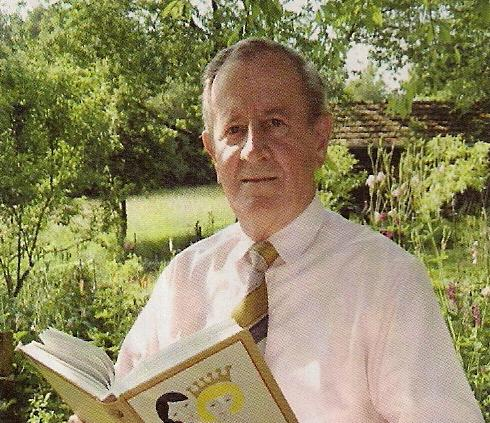
picture of Karel Krajcar holding book

Károly Krajczár (Slovene: Karel Krajcar) (September 2, 1936 – April 18, 2018) was a Hungarian Slovene teacher and writer. He was born in Apátistvánfalva. He wrote Slovene textbooks and collected ethnological objects.

Krajczár was born in Apátistvánfalva. His parents was Károly Krajczár sg. and Etelka Borovnyák. In 1956, before the Hungarian Revolution, he participated in the sympathy demonstration for the Poles. In 1958, Krajczár received a Slovene-Hungarian professional certificate in Budapest. Between 1964 and 1970, he was a professional inspector for the Slovene language and also a Slovene teacher at Berzsenyi College in Szombathely. In 1954 and 1996, his book Rábavidéki szlovén népmesék / Porabsek pravljice (Popular Fairy Tales of the Slovenes from the Rába Valley) appeared in Prekmurje Slovene, which was published in a new edition in Hungarian and standard Slovene in 1990. After the end of communism in Hungary, he tried to write coursebooks in the Prekmurje dialect and introduce new dialect-based education, but the initiative was rejected.

After his retirement, he lived in Apátistvánfalva.

== Sources ==
- Változó Világ: A Magyarországi Szlovének, Press Publica 2003. ISBN 963-9001-83-X

== See also ==
- List of Slovene writers and poets in Hungary
