= Action for Slander (novel) =

1936 novel by Mary Borden

- First edition
- Author: Mary Borden
- Language: English
- Publisher: Heinemann
- Publication date: 1936
- Media type: Print
- Pages: 304

Action for Slander is a drama novel by the Anglo-American writer Mary Borden. It was first published in 1936 by William Heinemann. A British army officer faces disgrace when he is falsely accused of cheating at cards by a fellow officer whose wife he has had an affair with.

== Adaptation ==
The novel was turned into a film in the year of its release. It was produced by Victor Saville at Alexander Korda's London Film Productions. It was directed by Tim Whelan and starred Clive Brook, Ann Todd and Margaretta Scott.The plot is based loosely on the real 'Baccarat Scandal' at Tranby Croft in 1890 and the subsequent trial at which Edward VII was a witness. In the novel the game is changed to poker.

== Bibliography ==
- White, Terry. Justice Denoted: The Legal Thriller in American, British, and Continental Courtroom Literature. Praeger, 2003.
