= Ma Văn Kháng =

Vietnamese writer

Đinh Trọng Đoàn, pen name Ma Văn Kháng (Đống Đa, Hanoi, 1 December 1936) is a Vietnamese writer. He was one of the first doi moi authors to appear alongside Lê Lựu and Dương Thu Hương.

== Works ==
- Against the Flood
