= John A. Moroso =

American novelist

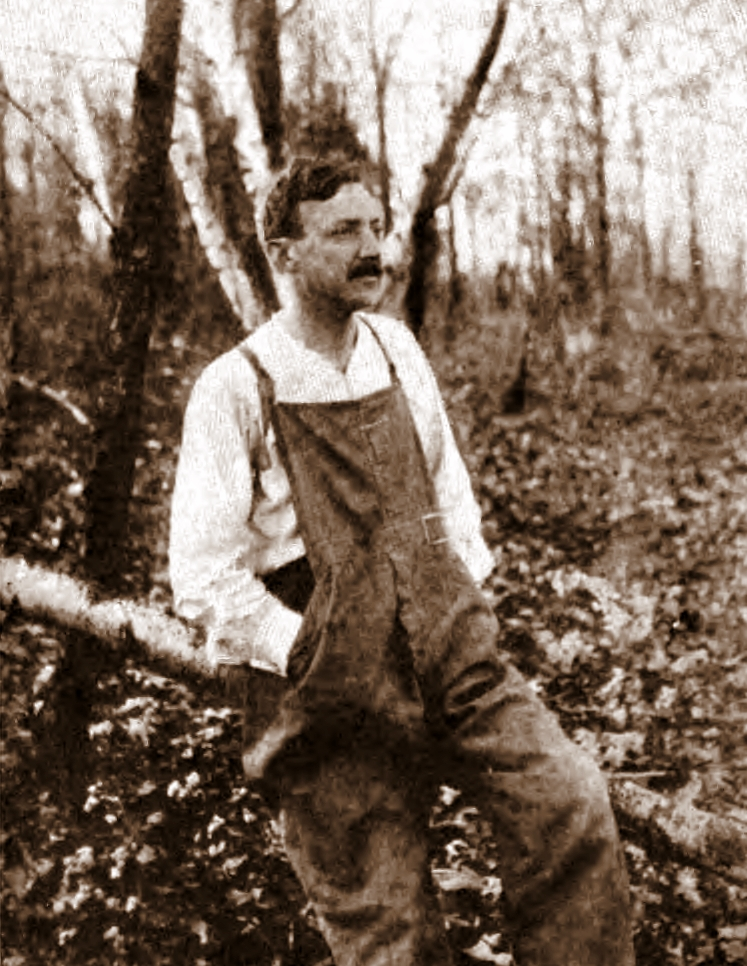
John A Moroso

John Antonio Moroso (1874–1957) was an American writer.

== Early life ==
Moroso was born into an Italian-American family in Charleston, South Carolina. He graduated from The Citadel in 1894 where he was poet laureate of his class.

== Career ==
He moved to New York City after graduation where he worked as a newspaper and court reporter. During the 1910s he wrote short stories for Collier's Weekly and other major publications. He also contributed his writings to the "American Boy Adventure Stories", a series of short stories by a variety of authors. While working in New York City he became a friend of the poet, Joyce Kilmer.

In 1923 Moroso wrote a story about life in an east side New York City neighborhood titled The Stumbling Herd, which was made into a silent film in 1926. In 1934 he published Black Chalice and two years later one of his best-known works, Nobody's Buddy. This novel about a boy and his dog originated as a short story called "Buddy and Waffles" published in the August 1915 issue of Ladies' Home Journal.

For a time, Moroso served as president of the corporation that published the Greenville Daily News in Greenville, South Carolina.
