= Trent's Last Case (1920 film) =

1920 film

- Directed by: Richard Garrick
- Written by: E. C. Bentley (novel)
- Starring: Gregory Scott; Pauline Peters; Clive Brook; George Foley
- Production company: Broadwest
- Release date: 1920
- Country: United Kingdom
- Language: English

Trent's Last Case is a 1920 British silent crime film directed by Richard Garrick and starring Gregory Scott, Pauline Peters and Clive Brook. It is an adaptation of the 1913 novel Trent's Last Case by E. C. Bentley. Detective Philip Trent investigates the mysterious murder of the financier Sigsbee Manderson.

== Cast ==
- Gregory Scott as Philip Trent
- Pauline Peters as Mabel Manderson
- Clive Brook as John Marlow
- George Foley as Sigsbee Manderson
- Cameron Carr as Inspector Murch
- P. E. Hubbard as Nathaniel Cupples
- Richard Norton as Martin
