= 1939 in literature =

This article contains information about the literary events and publications of 1939.

== Events ==
- January
  - American literary magazine The Kenyon Review is founded and edited by John Crowe Ransom.
  - The American pulp science fiction magazine Startling Stories appears, edited by Mort Weisinger. It includes The Black Flame by Stanley G. Weinbaum as lead novel.
  - Eando Binder's story "I, Robot" appears in the U.S. science fiction magazine Amazing Stories.
  - The Criterion, a British literary quarterly, is founded and edited by T. S. Eliot.
  - W. H. Auden and Christopher Isherwood set sail from England for the United States.
- January/February – Poetry London: a Bi-Monthly of Modern Verse and Criticism, founded and edited by Tambimuttu (with Dylan Thomas and others), is first published.
- February 6 – Raymond Chandler's California private detective Philip Marlowe is introduced in his first full-length work of crime fiction, The Big Sleep, which reworks elements from earlier short stories. It is published by Alfred A. Knopf in the United States.
- March – Isaac Asimov's first published short story, "Marooned off Vesta", appears in Astounding Science-Fiction magazine.
- March 4 – BBC Television broadcasts one of the first specially written television plays, Condemned To Be Shot by R. E. J. Brooke (perhaps the actor Reginald Brooke), live from its London studios at Alexandra Palace. The production notably uses a camera as the first-person view by the play's unseen central character.
- March 31 – 20th Century Fox releases a film version of The Hound of the Baskervilles, first of a Sherlock Holmes film series starring Basil Rathbone as Sherlock Holmes and Nigel Bruce as Dr Watson.
- c. April – Following the final offensive of the Spanish Civil War, Francoist troops burn the entire library of Pompeu Fabra, the main author of the normative reform of contemporary Catalan language, while shouting "¡Abajo la inteligencia!" (Down with the intelligentsia!).
- April 13 – The United Artists film version of Wuthering Heights, starring Merle Oberon and Laurence Olivier, is released.
- May – Jorge Luis Borges' first short story in his later characteristic style, "Pierre Menard, autor del Quijote", is published in the Buenos Aires literary magazine Sur.
- May – The Pocket Books mass-market paperback imprint is launched in the United States. The first of the nationally distributed titles is James Hilton's Lost Horizon.
- May 4 – James Joyce's last work, Finnegans Wake, is published in full by Faber and Faber in London.
- May 15 – Russian writer Isaac Babel is arrested by the NKVD at his dacha as part of the Great Purge in the Soviet Union, and incarcerated in the Lubyanka Building in Moscow.
- c. August – Ernest Vincent Wright publishes his lipogrammatic novel Gadsby, "a story of over 50,000 words without using the letter 'E'", in Los Angeles a few months before his death on October 7.
- August
  - Mikhail Bulgakov, while secretly working on The Master and Margarita, prepares the propaganda play Batumi, to romanticize events in Joseph Stalin's youth. The project is shelved by Stalin himself once Bulgakov announces he will interview witnesses personally.
  - Robert A. Heinlein's first published short story, "Life-Line", appears in Astounding Science-Fiction.
- Before September – After a pledge drive led by Renaud de Jouvenel and Lucien Lévy-Bruhl, the Romanian poet Benjamin Fondane is naturalized French and in September conscripted into the French Army, to serve in the Phony War.
- September 2 – Jean-Paul Sartre is conscripted into the French Army, where he will serve as a meteorologist.
- September 3 – Yorkshire-born novelist and playwright J. B. Priestley reads the first installment of his novel Let the People Sing, a celebration of local democracy (published on January 4), on BBC Home Service radio in the UK, the day war is declared.
- September 18 – The Polish painter, playwright and novelist Stanisław Ignacy Witkiewicz (born 1885) commits suicide after the Soviet invasion of Poland.
- September/October – Famous Fantastic Mysteries, a pulp magazine reprinting American science fiction and fantasy, begins publication in New York.
- Fall – Frank Herbert lies about his age to get his first job as a local newspaper reporter.
- November – The teenage Brendan Behan is arrested in Liverpool for possessing explosives.
- November 8 – Lindsay and Crouse's stage adaptation of Clarence Day's Life with Father opens at the Empire Theatre (42nd Street) in New York. Running until 12 July 1947, it becomes the all-time longest-running non-musical play in Broadway theatre.
- November/December – Captain Marvel makes his first appearance, in Whiz Comics #2 (cover date February 1940).

== New books ==
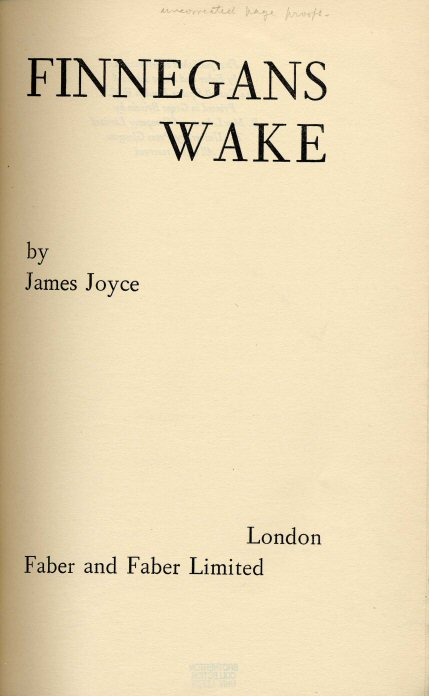

bababadalgharaghtakamminarronnkonnbronntonnerronntuonnthunntrovarrhounawnskawntoohoohoordenenthurnuk!

—From Finnegans Wake

=== Fiction ===
- Eric Ambler – The Mask of Dimitrios
- Sholem Asch – The Nazarene
- William Attaway – Let Me Breathe Thunder
- H. E. Bates – My Uncle Silas (short stories)
- Arna Wendell Bontemps – Drums at Dusk
- Pearl S. Buck – The Patriot
- Karel Čapek (died 1938) – Život a dílo skladatele Foltýna (Life and Work of the Composer Foltýn, translated as The Cheat, unfinished)
- Joyce Carey – Mister Johnson
- John Dickson Carr
  - The Black Spectacles
  - The Problem of the Wire Cage
  - The Reader is Warned (as Carter Dickson)
  - Drop to His Death (with John Rhode)
- Aimé Césaire – "Cahier d'un retour au pays natal" (in Volontés, August)
- Raymond Chandler – The Big Sleep
- James Hadley Chase – No Orchids for Miss Blandish
- Agatha Christie
  - Murder is Easy
  - The Regatta Mystery and Other Stories
  - Ten Little Niggers
- G.D.H. Cole and Margaret Cole – Greek Tragedy
- Cecil Day-Lewis – The Smiler with the Knife
- Jeffrey Dell – Nobody Ordered Wolves
- Pierre Drieu La Rochelle – Gilles
- John Fante – Ask the Dust
- William Faulkner – If I Forget Thee Jerusalem (The Wild Palms/Old Man)
- Vardis Fisher – Children of God
- Konstantine Gamsakhurdia – The Right Hand of the Grand Master (დიდოსტატის კონსტანტინეს მარჯვენა)
- Rumer Godden – Black Narcissus
- Henry Green – Party Going
- Yaroslav Halan – The Mountains are Smoking
- Cyril Hare – Suicide Excepted
- Ernest Hemingway – The Snows of Kilimanjaro
- Rayner Heppenstall – The Blaze of Noon
- Anne Hocking – Old Mrs. Fitzgerald
- Zora Neale Hurston – Moses, Man of the Mountain
- Aldous Huxley – After Many a Summer
- Christopher Isherwood – Goodbye to Berlin
- James Joyce – Finnegans Wake
- Arthur Koestler – The Gladiators
- Richard Llewellyn – How Green Was My Valley
- H. P. Lovecraft – The Outsider and Others
- Ngaio Marsh – Overture to Death
- Henry Miller – Tropic of Capricorn
- Gladys Mitchell – Printer's Error
- Christopher Morley – Kitty Foyle
- Ian Niall (as John McNeillie) – Wigtown Ploughman
- Anaïs Nin – Winter of Artifice
- Flann O'Brien – At Swim-Two-Birds
- John O'Hara – Files on Parade
- Juan Carlos Onetti – El pozo (The Pit)
- George Orwell – Coming Up for Air
- Ellery Queen – The Dragon's Teeth
- Katherine Anne Porter – Pale Horse, Pale Rider
- Clayton Rawson – The Footprints on the Ceiling
- Seymour Reit – The Friendly Ghost
- Jean Rhys – Good Morning, Midnight
- Dorothy L. Sayers – In the Teeth of the Evidence
- Pierre Schaeffer – Chlothar Nicole (Clotaire Nicole)
- John Steinbeck – The Grapes of Wrath
- Gladys Bronwyn Stern – The Woman in the Hall
- Rex Stout – Some Buried Caesar
- Cecil Street – Death on Sunday
- Jan Struther – Mrs. Miniver
- Phoebe Atwood Taylor – Cold Steal (as Alice Tilton)
- Dalton Trumbo – Johnny Got His Gun
- S. S. Van Dine – The Winter Murder Case
- Simon Vestdijk – Sint Sebastiaan (first book chronologically in the Anton Wachter cycle)
- Elio Vittorini – Conversations in Sicily (Conversazione in Sicilia)
- Nathanael West – The Day of the Locust
- Ernest Vincent Wright – Gadsby
- Marguerite Yourcenar – Coup de Grâce

=== Children and young people ===
- Ludwig Bemelmans – Madeline (first in an eponymous series of seven books)
- Enid Blyton – The Enchanted Wood
- Edgar Rice Burroughs – Tarzan the Magnificent
- Lavinia R. Davis – Hobby Horse Hill
- Hardie Gramatky – Little Toot
- Carolyn Haywood – "B" is for Betsy (first in Betsy series)
- Robert Lawson – Ben and Me: An Astonishing Life of Benjamin Franklin By His Good Mouse Amos
- Hilda Lewis – The Ship That Flew
- Lucy Maud Montgomery – Anne of Ingleside
- Violet Needham – The Black Riders (first in the Stormy Petrel series)
- Carola Oman – Alfred, King of the English
- Arthur Ransome – We Didn't Mean To Go To Sea
- Marjorie Kinnan Rawlings – The Yearling
- Joan G. Robinson – A Stands for Angel
- Felix Salten – Bambis Kinder, eine Familie in Walde (Bambi's Children)
- Alison Uttley – A Traveller in Time
- Laura Ingalls Wilder – By the Shores of Silver Lake

=== Drama ===
- Philip Barry – The Philadelphia Story
- Bertolt Brecht
  - Life of Galileo (Leben des Galilei; completed)
  - Mother Courage and Her Children (Mutter Courage und ihre Kinder; written)
- Mikhail Bulgakov – Batumi (left unfinished)
- Max Catto – Punch without Judy
- T. S. Eliot – The Family Reunion
- Jean Giraudoux – Ondine
- Ian Hay – Little Ladyship
- Frank Harvey – Saloon Bar
- Lillian Hellman – The Little Foxes
- George S. Kaufman and Moss Hart – The Man Who Came to Dinner
- Joseph Kesselring – Arsenic and Old Lace
- Clare Boothe Luce – Margin for Error
- Hugh Mills and Wells Root – As You Are
- William Saroyan – The Time of Your Life
- Will Scott – Married for Money

=== Poetry ===
- W. H. Auden
  - Journey to a War (with diary entries and nonfiction prose by Christopher Isherwood; March 16)
  - "September 1, 1939" (in The New Republic (U.S.) October 18)
- Vladimir Cavarnali – Răsadul verde al inimii stelele de sus îl plouă (The Heart's Green Seedling Is Rained upon by the Stars Above)
- Aimé Césaire – Cahier d'un retour au pays natal (Notebook on a Return to the Native Land)
- T. S. Eliot – Old Possum's Book of Practical Cats
- José Gorostiza – Muerte sin fin (Death without End)
- Javier del Granado – Rosas Pálidas (Pale Roses)
- Changampuzha Krishna Pillai – Rahtapuspangal
- Christopher Smart (died 1771) – Jubilate Agno (as Rejoice in the Lamb: A Song from Bedlam, edited by W. F. Stead; completed by 1763)

=== Non-fiction ===
- Adrian Bell – Men and the Fields
- Lord David Cecil – The Young Melbourne and the Story of his Marriage with Caroline Lamb
- Savitri Devi – A Warning to the Hindus
- Norbert Elias – The Civilizing Process (Über den Prozeß der Zivilisation)
- Mary Lascelles – Jane Austen and Her Art
- Erwin Panofsky – Studies in Iconology
- Ed Ricketts – Between Pacific Tides
- Antoine de Saint-Exupéry – Wind, Sand and Stars (Terre des hommes)
- Ronald Syme – The Roman Revolution
- Bill W. and Dr. Bob – The Big Book
- Gamel Woolsey – Death's Other Kingdom

== Births ==
- January 10 – Jared Carter, American poet and author
- January 12 – Jacques Hamelink, Dutch poet, novelist and literary critic, best known for short stories (died 2021)
- January 29 – Germaine Greer, Australian-born feminist author
- February 19 – Erin Pizzey, English novelist and founder of world's first domestic violence shelter
- February 25 – Gerald Murnane, Australian novelist
- March 15 – Alicia Freilich, Venezuelan novelist
- March 25 – Toni Cade Bambara, African-American writer (died 1995)
- April 10 – Penny Vincenzi, née Hannaford, English novelist (died 2018)
- April 12 – Alan Ayckbourn, English dramatist
- April 13 – Seamus Heaney, Irish poet (died 2013)
- April 22 – Jason Miller, American playwright and actor (died 2001)
- May 4 – Amos Oz, né Klausner, Israeli author (died 2018)
- June 5 – Margaret Drabble, English novelist
- June 14 – Penelope Farmer, English children's writer
- June 15 – Brian Jacques, English writer (died 2011)
- July 2 – Ferdinand Mount, English journalist and novelist
- July 27 – Michael Longley, Northern Irish poet (died 2025)
- August 1 – Robert James Waller, American novelist (died 2017)
- September 6 – Dan Cragg, American science-fiction author
- September 16 – Breyten Breytenbach, South African writer and painter
- September 9 – Ed Victor, American-born literary agent (died 2017)
- September 24 – Jacky Gillott, English novelist (suicide 1980)
- October 6 – Melvyn Bragg, English novelist, critic and broadcast presenter
- October 7 – Clive James, Australian writer, humorist and television personality (died 2019)
- October 8 – Harvey Pekar, American memoirist and graphic-novel scriptwriter (died 2010)
- October 9 – John Pilger, Australian-born journalist and documentary filmmaker
- October 28 – Giulio Angioni, Italian writer and anthropologist (died 2017)
- October 29 – Malay Roy Choudhury, Bengali poet, novelist and creator of the Indian Hungry generation literary and cultural movement
- November 17 – Auberon Waugh, English journalist and novelist (died 2001)
- November 18 – Margaret Atwood, Canadian novelist and poet
- November 25 – Shelagh Delaney, English dramatist (died 2011)
- December 3 – Lee Israel, American biographer and literary forger (died 2014)
- December 11 – Thomas McGuane, American writer
- December 18 – Michael Moorcock, English science fiction writer

== Deaths ==
- January 8 – Caton Theodorian, Romanian dramatist and novelist (born 1871)
- January 27 - Lewis Jones, Welsh miners' leader and novelist (born 1897)
- January 28 – W. B. Yeats, Irish poet (born 1865)
- February 2 – Amanda McKittrick Ros, Irish novelist and poet noted for her purple prose (born 1860)
- February 5 – Teresa Mañé, Spanish teacher, editor and writer (born [1865)
- February 18 – Okamoto Kanoko (岡本 かの子, Ohnuki Kano), Japanese tanka poet (born 1889)
- February 22 – Antonio Machado, Spanish poet (born 1875)
- March 7 – Ludwig Fulda, German playwright and poet, suicide (born 1862)
- March 23 – Richard Halliburton, American travel writer (born 1900)
- April 5 – Sibyl Marvin Huse, French-born American author and teacher (born 1866).
- April 11 – S. S. Van Dine (Willard Huntington Wright), American crime novelist and art critic (born 1888)
- May 23 – Margarete Böhme, German novelist (born 1867)
- May 27 – Joseph Roth, Austrian novelist (born 1894)
- June 5 – Solomon Cleaver, Canadian storyteller and novelist (born 1855)
- June 13 – Volter Kilpi, Finnish novelist (born 1874)
- June 14 – Vladislav Khodasevich, Russian poet and critic (born 1886)
- June 26 – Ford Madox Ford (Ford Hermann Hueffer), English novelist (born 1873)
- July 5 – Mrs. O. F. Walton, English writer of Christian children's books (born 1849)
- July 8 – Havelock Ellis, English sexual psychologist and writer (born 1859)
- August 7 – Leonard Merrick, English novelist (born 1864)
- August 15 – Federico Gamboa, Mexican diplomat and writer (born 1864)
- August 20 – Agnes Giberne, English children's writer (born 1845)
- August 23
  - Sidney Howard, American writer (born 1891)
  - Robin Hyde (Iris Guiver Wilkinson), South African-born New Zealand poet and novelist, suicide (born 1905)
- August 31 – Wilhelm Bölsche, German journalist, editor and science writer (born [1861)
- September 6 – Arthur Rackham, English book illustrator (born 1867)
- September 7 – Kyōka Izumi, Japanese author (b. 1873)
- September 19 – Ethel M. Dell, English romantic novelist (born 1881)
- October 23 – Zane Grey, American western novelist (born 1872)
- October 29 – Dwight B. Waldo, American educator and historian (born 1864)
- November – Pedro Nolasco Cruz Vergara, Chilean literary critic, novelist, writer, and politician (born 1857)
- November 6 – Eliza D. Keith, American educator, author, and journalist (born 1854)
- December 2 – Llewelyn Powys, English novelist and autobiographer (born 1884)
- December 13 – Frances Brackett Damon (Percy Larkin), American writer (born 1857)
- unknown dates
  - Anna Braden, American author, editor, elocutionist (born 1858)
  - Mary Frances Dowdall, English novelist and non-fiction writer (born 1876)
  - Culai Neniu, Moldovan folklorist and dramatist (shot; born 1905)

== Awards ==
- Carnegie Medal for children's literature: Eleanor Doorly, The Radium Woman
- James Tait Black Memorial Prize:
  - Fiction: Aldous Huxley, After Many a Summer Dies the Swan
  - Biography: David C. Douglas, English Scholars
- Newbery Medal for children's literature: Elizabeth Enright, Thimble Summer
- Nobel Prize in Literature: Frans Eemil Sillanpää
- Pulitzer Prize:
  - Drama: Robert E. Sherwood, Abe Lincoln in Illinois
  - Poetry: John Gould Fletcher, Selected Poems
  - Novel: Marjorie Kinnan Rawlings, The Yearling
- Hugo Award:
  - Best Novella: Don A. Stuart, Who Goes There?
