= Death from a Top Hat =

1938 novel by Clayton Rawson

Death From a Top Hat
- The 1945 Dell Edition, mapback No. 69
- Author: Clayton Rawson
- Language: English
- Series: The Great Merlini
- Genre: Mystery novels
- Publisher: G.P. Putnam's Sons
- Publication date: 1938
- Publication place: United States
- Media type: Print (Hardback & Paperback)
- Pages: 240 pp (in Dell edition shown)
- Followed by: The Footprints on the Ceiling

Death from a Top Hat (1938) is a locked-room mystery novel written by Clayton Rawson. It is the first of four mysteries featuring The Great Merlini, a stage magician and Rawson's favorite protagonist.

In a poll of 17 detective story writers and reviewers, this novel was voted as the seventh best locked room mystery of all time.

== Plot summary ==
"As the story opens, free-lance writer Ross Harte is writing a magazine article on the modern detective story, and most of this article-to-be is included in the first chapter."

When a magician is found dead inside his locked and (thoroughly) sealed apartment, the police call in Merlini to help explain the impossible, "perhaps on the theory that it takes a magician to catch one." All the suspects, however, are accustomed to producing the impossible. They include a professional medium, an escape artist, a couple of magicians, a ventriloquist, and two people who claim to exhibit mental telepathy in their nightclub act.

The first murder victim is found spread-eagled inside a pentagram, surrounded by the trappings of black magic. The second victim, also spread-eagled, seems to have been in two places at once during the first murder. After a number of breakneck chases from one scene to the next, Merlini and his assistant are a couple of steps ahead of the police and provide a far-fetched but logical solution to the impossible crimes.

In between, Merlini and other characters deliver great chunks of informative conversation mixed with paragraphs of information about entirely unrelated but fascinating topics, like yogic bilocation, making the keys of a typewriter move without touching them, and even posing a tricky problem in geometry. The action also stops for a while when Merlini quotes a well-known passage from John Dickson Carr's The Three Coffins about the nature of locked-room mystery novels, and adds some flourishes of his own in relation to the problems at hand.

The penultimate scene in which the murderer is revealed is enlivened by one of the suspects attempting (on stage) to catch a bullet in his teeth, and all is explained in the final chapter when everyone gathers at Merlini's Magic Shop in the best whodunnit tradition.

== Film adaptation ==
The book was adapted for the film Miracles for Sale (1939) starring Robert Young and directed by Tod Browning, whose last film it was. The film simplifies the complex plot and replaces the character of Merlini with "The Great Morgan" (Mike), played by Young.
