= The House at Satan's Elbow =

1965 novel by John Dickson Carr

- First US edition
- Author: John Dickson Carr
- Language: English
- Series: Gideon Fell
- Genre: Mystery, detective novel
- Publisher: Hamish Hamilton (UK); Harper & Row (USA)
- Publication date: 1965
- Publication place: United Kingdom
- Media type: Print (hardback & paperback)
- Pages: 249 pp
- Preceded by: In Spite of Thunder (1960)
- Followed by: Panic in Box C (1966)

The House at Satan's Elbow, first published in 1965, is a mystery novel by John Dickson Carr. Featuring his series detective Gideon Fell, this novel is a locked room mystery. It was dedicated to his fellow mystery writer Clayton Rawson "because of our mutual interest in tricks and impossibilities".

== Plot summary ==
Garret Anderson, a historian, has enjoyed an unexpected financial windfall when one of his historical biographies is turned into a smash-hit musical. At loose ends, he agrees to visit an old friend's family home in Hampshire, England to bear witness to some unusual happenings. A missing family will is at the heart of matters, but things are also complicated by someone who is playing the role of the ghost of Mr. Justice Wildfare, 18th century hanging judge and family ancestor. When the head of the family is shot with a blank cartridge by a shadowy figure who vanishes through a locked window, and is later shot again, this time more seriously, Gideon Fell is called in to explain the bizarre events and bring them home to the criminal.
