= The Man Who Wouldn't Die (1942 film) =

1942 film by Herbert I. Leeds

- Directed by: Herbert I. Leeds
- Written by: Brett Halliday (character)
- Screenplay by: Arnaud d'Usseau
- Based on: No Coffin for the Corpse; 1942 novel by Clayton Rawson
- Produced by: Sol M. Wurtzel
- Starring: Lloyd Nolan; Marjorie Weaver; Helene Reynolds
- Cinematography: Joseph MacDonald
- Edited by: Fred Allen
- Music by: David Raksin
- Distributed by: Twentieth Century Fox Film Corporation
- Release date: May 1, 1942
- Running time: 65 minutes
- Country: United States
- Language: English

The Man Who Wouldn't Die is a 1942 American comedy horror mystery film directed by Herbert I. Leeds, starring Lloyd Nolan and Marjorie Weaver. This movie was the fifth of a series of seven of the Michael Shayne movies produced by Twentieth Century Fox between 1940 and 1942.

The original source material was a novel by Clayton Rawson that featured his magician-sleuth the Great Merlini. However, in the film, the sleuth was changed to Michael Shayne, a private detective created by Brett Halliday, though the Great Merlini was retained as a minor character.

== Plot ==
Late at night, watched by Anna Wolff, three men drive away with a body, which they secretly bury, unaware they are being watched.

Anna is unexpectedly visited by her stepdaughter Kay. Shortly afterward, Kay's wealthy father Dudley, Dr. Haggard (a researcher working for Wolff) and Alfred Dunning (Wolff's secretary) show up. Kay announces that she has married Roger Blake. Her father thinks Roger is after his money. After Kay leaves, Mr. Wolff tells the others that she is not to know what happened in the house that night.

Later that night, a man enters Kay's room, waking her and firing a gun. Her screams bring her father and stepmother. Dudley finds a clod of dirt in the bathroom. He tells Kay she was dreaming, and there is no bullet hole; however, she is unconvinced. The three men return to the grave, only to find it empty.

Kay hires private detective Michael Shayne, someone she has employed frequently. Because her father is jittery from being under Senate investigation, Kay has Shayne pose as her husband. Shayne finds the bullet, embedded in a bedpost. In Haggard's laboratory, he finds bullets of the same caliber. He sits in a chair hooked up to equipment, which he turns on; he is saved from electrocution by Haggard. After Kay blurts out that they found a bullet, Haggard admits he had an automatic pistol, though he claims he lost it.

Wolff then claims that he had a visitor the previous night: a former partner whom he occasionally helped financially. The man demanded more money, and when Wolff refused, he became violent. Wolff does not want to involve the police, but assures Shayne that precautions have been taken.

However, someone turns off the burglar alarm and shoots Dr. Haggard dead. Shayne chases after him, but runs into the caretaker. Finally, Wolff agrees to notify the police. While Police Chief Jonathan Meek is questioning Wolff and the others, the alarm sounds. Shayne quickly turns out the lights, and the killer misses again. The murderer steals Meek's car. After a chase, Michael takes a shortcut Meek knows, and they block the road. The killer swerves, crashes and is killed.

With the case apparently solved, Michael goes to see the Great Merlini, a magician friend, and asks about the "buried alive act". Merlini says he saw it performed only by Houdini and by Zorah Bey. In Merlini's scrapbook, Michael finds pictures of Zorah Bey which match the dead man. Shayne calls Meek and, posing as a reporter, gets him to check the body. It is gone.

Shayne returns to the Wolff mansion, only to find Kay's real husband there. He still manages to talk in private with Wolff, his wife and Dunning. Shayne has figured out so much that Wolff admits he met the dead man the previous night. The man tried to blackmail Wolff with some documents he had. Wolff grabbed at them, and in the ensuing fight, killed the man, or so he thought. Now he has doubts, but Shayne pretends to disbelieve him and leaves.

That night, Zorah Bey shows up, but Shayne knocks him out. Then he props up Zorah Bey in Anna Wolff's darkened bedroom doorway. She shoots at him but hits a mirror Shane had positioned to foil her aim. Shayne disarms her. When all concerned are present, he explains that Anna is really Zorah Bey's wife. Zorah Bey had returned to the United States a month before and learned Anna had married Wolff, while also becoming "very friendly" with Haggard. Zorah Bey demanded money. Anna and Haggard agreed to help him pretend to be killed so he could blackmail Wolff. However, they doublecrossed Zorah Bey by really burying him, only for the curious caretaker, who had witnessed the burial, to dig him up. Zorah Bey then mistook Kay for Anna the first night. He did kill Haggard and was trying to do Anna in when Shayne intervened.

== Cast ==
- Lloyd Nolan as Michael Shayne
- Marjorie Weaver as Kay Wolff Blake
- Helene Reynolds as Anna Wolff
- Henry Wilcoxon as Dr. Haggard
- Richard Derr as Roger Blake
- Paul Harvey as Dudley Wolff
- Billy Bevan as Phillips, the butler
- Olin Howland as Chief of Police Jonathan Meek (as Olin Howlin)
- Robert Emmett Keane as Alfred Dunning
- LeRoy Mason as Zorah Bey
- Jeff Corey as Coroner Tim Larsen
- Francis Ford as Caretaker
- Mary Field as Maid (uncredited)
- Charles Irwin as Gus, The Great Merlini (uncredited)

== Production ==
The film reused the set from the 1939 Basil Rathbone version of The Hound of the Baskervilles.

== Reception ==
Leonard Maltin gave it two stars out of four, writing that "Nolan is efficient as wisecracking detective Michael Shayne with a tougher caper than usual."

Geoff Mayer, in Historical Dictionary of Crime Films, considers this the best of the series.
