= The Third Bullet (novel) =

1937 novel by John Dickson Carr

- First edition (UK)
- Author: John Dickson Carr
- Language: English
- Genre: Mystery, detective, horror novel
- Publisher: Hodder & Stoughton (UK); Harper (USA)
- Publication date: 1937
- Publication place: United States
- Media type: Print (hardback & paperback)
- Pages: 128

The Third Bullet is a novel by Carter Dickson (pseudonym of John Dickson Carr), first published in the United Kingdom in 1937.

This novel is a "whodunit" and a locked-room mystery.

The two regular detectives of the author, Gideon Fell and Henry Merrivale, do not appear in this novel.

== Reception ==
Kirkus gave a curt review stating that the book was an "active mental exercise."
