= The Crooked Hinge =

1938 novel by John Dickson Carr

- First US edition
- Author: John Dickson Carr
- Language: English
- Series: Gideon Fell
- Genre: Mystery fiction, detective fiction
- Publisher: Hamish Hamilton (UK) & Harper (US)
- Publication date: 1938
- Publication place: United Kingdom
- Media type: Print (hardback & paperback)
- Preceded by: To Wake the Dead (1938)
- Followed by: The Black Spectacles (1939) (US title: The Problem of the Green Capsule)

The Crooked Hinge is a mystery novel (1938) by detective novelist John Dickson Carr. It combines a seemingly impossible throat-slashing with elements of witchcraft, an automaton modelled on Maelzel's Chess Player, and the story of the Tichborne Claimant. It was dedicated to fellow author Dorothy Sayers "in friendship and esteem".

In a poll of 17 detective story writers and reviewers, this novel was voted as the fourth best locked room mystery of all time. The Hollow Man also by John Dickson Carr was voted the best.

== Plot introduction ==
In his ninth outing, Dr. Fell spends July 1937 at a small village in Kent. John Farnleigh is a wealthy young man married to his childhood love, and a survivor of the Titanic disaster. When another man comes along claiming to be the real John Farnleigh, an inquest is scheduled to determine which individual is the real Farnleigh. Then the first Farnleigh is killed—his throat is slashed in full view of three people, all of whom claim that they saw no one there. Later, a mysterious automaton reaches out to touch a housemaid, who nearly dies of fright, and a thumbograph (an early toy associated with the taking of fingerprints) disappears from a locked library. Dr. Gideon Fell investigates and reveals the surprising solution to all these questions.

== Literary significance and criticism ==
This novel was fourth in a list of the top ten "impossible crime" mysteries of all time (created by noted locked-room mystery writer Edward D. Hoch).
