= Deirdre Mullins =

Irish actor and director

- Born: Dublin, Ireland
- Education: Trinity College Dublin; University of St Andrews (BA); Bristol Old Vic Theatre School
- Occupation: Actor
- Years active: 2009–present

Deirdre Mullins is an Irish actress, director and activist. In 2017, she won a Scottish BAFTA for Best Actress in Film for her role in The Dark Mile.

== Early life and education ==
Born in Dublin, Mullins grew up in Stoneybatter on the city's Northside. Her family moved to the suburb Howth when she was 10. She was head girl at Mount Temple Comprehensive School in Clontarf. She began her studies in Drama and Theatre at Trinity College Dublin. She then transferred to the University of St Andrews where she studied Anthropology and later graduated with a degree in English Literature in 2006. She participated in the Trinity Players and the St Andrews Mermaids. She went on to train at the Bristol Old Vic Theatre School from 2006 to 2008 before moving to London.

== Career ==
Mullins starred as Naomi in the Channel 4 series Man Down. Her theatre work includes playing Rosalind in As You Like It at Shakespeare's Globe, Lika in Marina Carr's 16 Possible Glimpses at the Abbey Theatre, and Jessie Taite in Seán O'Casey's The Silver Tassie at the National Theatre.

Mullins' directing debut, a production of Mary Zimmerman's Metamorphoses, was set in a hotel swimming pool and won her rave reviews at the Edinburgh Fringe 2006 including The Scotsman's top 5 shows to see at the Fringe. It was in Time Out's top 3 shows at the Fringe; giving it 5 stars, Rachel Halliburton said 'This is the kind of unexpected discovery that critics live for at Edinburgh'. A decade later, Mullins directed her second show, an experimental new play by Bea Roberts, Infinity Pool, which won a Toast of the Fringe Award at Plymouth Fringe Festival and went on to enjoy a place on The Guardian's list of recommended shows at the Edinburgh Fringe & International Festival 2016. The critic Lyn Gardner described it as 'painfully funny'. Giving it 5 stars from The Stage, Stewart Pringle said it was 'utterly unique and exceptional in every way, it's a heart-breaking story of a stunted life, told with theatrical verve and palpable compassion'. The play was short-listed for the highly prestigious Total Theatre Award.

Mullins is a core committee member of ERA 50:50, a campaign calling for equal representation of women on screen and stage. She made an impassioned speech about this when picking up her BAFTA (Scotland).

== Filmography ==
=== Film ===
Year	Title	Role	Notes
2009	Holy Water	Kate Mulvey	
2012	Comedown	Newsreader 1	
2013	Doghouse	Julie Stepton	Short film
2015	My Name Is Emily	Emily's Mother	
2016	Tank 432	Sarah Karlsson	
2017	The Dark Mile	Claire	
2018	Ötzi & the Mystery of Time	Helena	
2019	Crime Lessons: The Muggening	Chloe	Short film
2019	Mumford & Sons: Beloved	Mother	Music Video
2020	The Christmas Ball	Clare	
2022	Mandrake	Cathy Madden	
2025	In the Lost Lands	Mara	

=== Television ===
Year	Title	Role	Notes
2009	Ashes to Ashes	Nurse	1 episode
2010	De Troon (The Throne)	Joanna	Episode: "Maak er maar een republiek van"
2010	Midsomer Murders	Libby Morris	Episode: "The Noble Art"
2011	Trivia	Gráinne	4 episodes
2012	Whitechapel	Heather Green	1 episode
2012	The Best Possible Taste: The Kenny Everett Story	BBC Receptionist	Television film
2013	Doctors	Chrissie Welsh	Episode: "Over a Barrel"
2013	Vikings	Peasant Woman	Episode: "A King's Ransom"
2013	Breathless	Diana Fairfax	Miniseries; 1 episode
2013	Man Down	Naomi	Main role (series 1)
2015	Inspector George Gently	Valerie Cullen	Episode: "Breath in the Air"
2015	The Frankenstein Chronicles	Agnes Marlott	4 episodes
2016	Father Brown	Bebe Fontaine	Episode: "The Mask of the Demon"
2017	Will	Anne Shakespeare	3 episodes
2018	The Romanoffs	Natalie Burrows	Episode: "The One That Holds Everything"
2019	Flack	Janet	Episode: "Calvin"
2020	Miss Scarlet and The Duke	Tabitha Butler	Episode: "The Woman in Red"
2021	The Drowning	Kate	4 episodes
2021	Shadow and Bone	Tante Heleen	2 episodes
2021	Angela Black	Emma	1 episode
2022	London Kills	Dr Cassidy Hodges	Episode: "Control Freak"
2023	The Couple Next Door	Lena	

=== Video games ===
Year	Title	Role	Notes
2018	Overkill's The Walking Dead	Heather	

== Stage ==
Year	Title	Role	Theatre	Director
2008	Twelfth Night by William Shakespeare	Viola	Redgrave Theatre	John Hartoch
2008	A Month in the Country by Ivan Turgenev (trans. Brian Friel)	Lizaveta	Tobacco Factory Theatre	Sue Wilson
2009	Measure for Measure by William Shakespeare	Mariana	Thelma Holt Ltd/Theatre Royal, Plymouth	Jamie Glover
2009	The 24 Hour Plays: Old Vic New Voices	Actor	The Old Vic	Alice Lacey
2011	Old Vic 24 Hour Plays Celebrity Gala	Actor	The Old Vic	Alexander Ferris
2011	16 Possible Glimpses (world premiere) by Marina Carr	Lika	Abbey Theatre	Wayne Jordan
2011	A Midsummer Night's Dream by William Shakespeare	Helena	Headlong	Natalie Abrahami
2012	As You Like It by William Shakespeare	Rosalind	Shakespeare's Globe	James Dacre
2013	The Man Who Pays The Piper by GB Stern	Daryll	Orange Tree Theatre	Helen Leblique
2014	The Silver Tassie by Seán O'Casey	Jessie Taite	Lyttelton, National Theatre	Howard Davies

== Audio ==
=== Radio ===
Year	Title	Role	Channel	Notes
2009	Cavity	Jemma	BBC Radio 4	dir Alison Crawford
2009	The Lake	Reader	BBC Radio 4	dir Sarah Blunt
2011	Positive	Tess	BBC Radio 4	dir Sara Davies
2017	The Cold God of Bad Luck by Colin Barrett	Reader	BBC Radio 4	prod Duncan Minshull
2019	The Country Girls by Edna O'Brien	Martha	BBC Radio 4	dir Sally Avens & Jessica Dromgoole
2020	For the Love of Leo	Mary Grace	BBC Radio 4	dir Marilyn Imrie
2021	The Healer	Reader	BBC Radio 4	dir Maggie Ayre
2022	English Rose	Siobhán	BBC Radio 4	dir Mary Ward-Lowery

=== Drama ===
Year	Title	Role	Production company	Notes
2015	The Confessions of Dorian Gray	Scarlet Moore	Big Finish Productions	dir Scott Handcock
2015	Dracula	Mina Harker	Big Finish Productions	dir Scott Handcock
2016	Doctor Who – "The Very Dark Thing"	Admiral Effenish	Big Finish Productions	dir Scott Handcock
2016	Charlotte Pollard	Naomi	Big Finish Productions	dir Nicholas Briggs
2017	The Prisoner S2	Number 2	Big Finish Productions	dir Nicholas Briggs
2017	Hamlet	Ophelia	Big Finish Productions	dir Scott Handcock
2017	Doctor Who – "The War Master"	Osen	Big Finish Productions	dir Scott Handcock
2018	Cicero	Vitellia	Big Finish Productions	dir Scott Handcock (nominated for Best Audio Drama 2018 Audie Awards)
2018	Class – "Gifted"	Mab	Big Finish Productions	dir Scott Handcock
2019	Doctor Who – "Feast of Fear"	The Spae Wife	Big Finish Productions	dir Scott Handcock
2019	Torchwood – "Serenity"	Kelly	Big Finish Productions	dir Scott Handcock
2020	Doctor Who – "The Headless Ones"	Amanda Latimer	Big Finish Productions	dir Scott Handcock
2020	Dracula's War	Mina Harker	Big Finish Productions	dir Scott Handcock
