= Farhad Pirbal =

Doctor Farhad Pirbal
- دکتۆر فەرھاد پیرباڵ
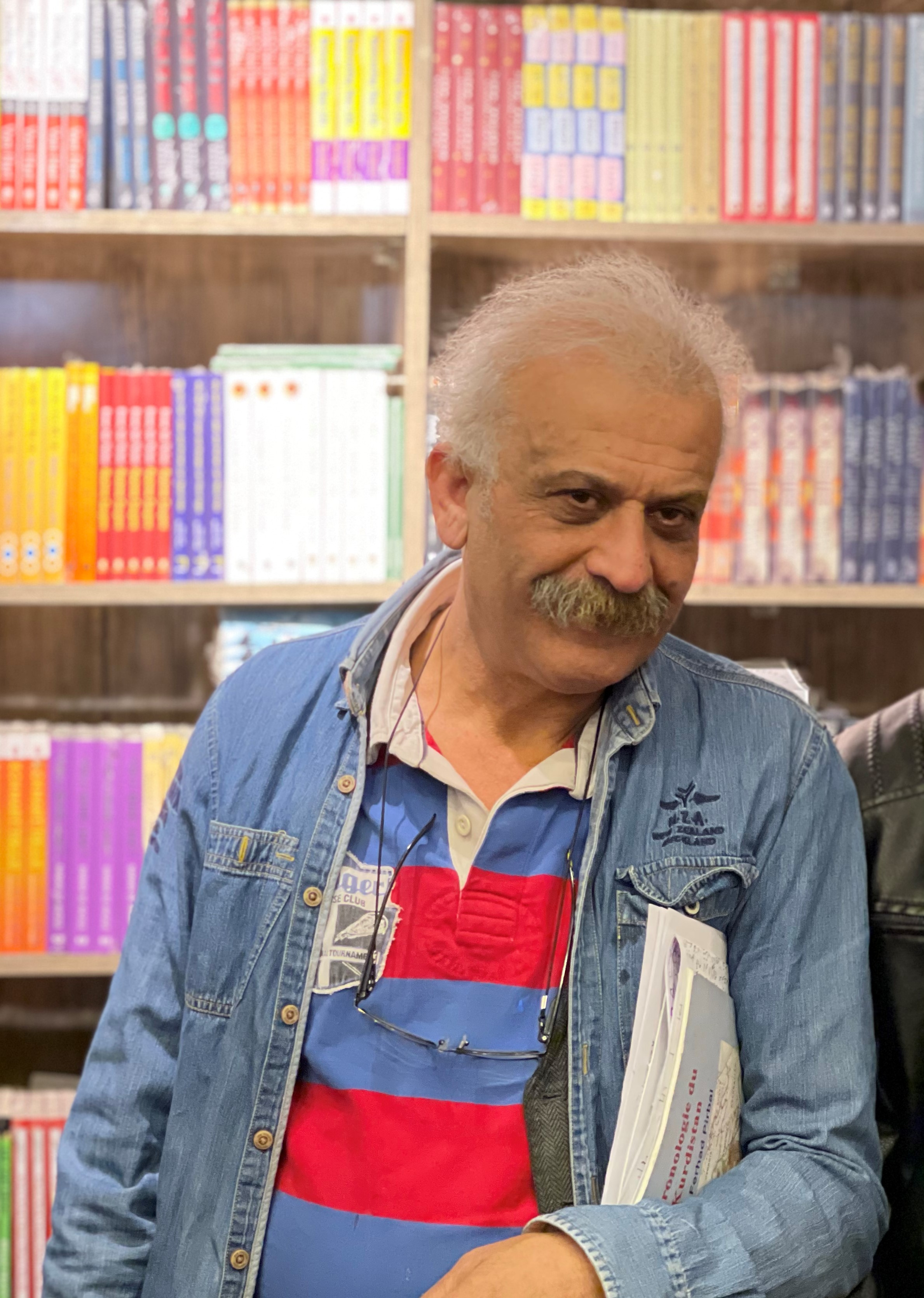
- Born: August 20, 1961 (age 65); Hawler, Kurdistan Region
- Education: University of Sorbonne (Doctorate)
- Occupations: {{flatlist: Writer; philosopher; poet; painter; critic}}
- Spouses: Tarza Jaff (divorced); Alla Dlshad (divorced)
- Children: 2

Farhad Pirbal (Sorani Kurdish: فەرھاد پیرباڵ; kurmanji Kurdish: Ferhad Pîrbal; born 20 August 1961) is a Kurdish writer, singer, poet, painter and critic.

== Career ==
He was born in the city of Erbil (Hawler) in Southern Kurdistan. He studied Kurdish language and literature in the University of Sulaymaniyah.

In 1986, he left Kurdistan to Denmark, Germany, and finally settling in France. He continued his studies in University of Sorbonne in the field of Kurdish literature. After going back to Southern Kurdistan, in 1994, he established the Sharafkhan Badlisi cultural center.

Several of his works have been translated into Spanish and English by Jiyar Homer.

== Bibliography ==
=== Fiction ===
- Mal awa, ey Wilatekem (Goodbye, My Country), Play, 1998.
- Heşîşkêşekan (The Weed Smokers), Play, 2000
- Petatexorekan (The Potato Eaters), Stories, 2000.
- Mûlazim Tehsîn û Şity Tirîş (Lieutenant Tahsin and Other Things), 2001.
- Santyago Dî Kompostêla (Santiago de Compostela), Novel, 2002.
- Mindalbaz (Pedophile), Novel, 2003.
- Piyawêky Şepqereşy Paltoreşy Pelawşîn (A Man with a Black Hat and Black Pants and Blue Shies), Novel, 2003.
- Hikayetekanî Bawkim (My Dad's Stories), Novel, 2007.
- Hotêl Ewrûpa (Hotel Europe), Novel, 2010.
- Ew Pyawey Tenya Le Xewda Dinyay Pê Ciwan Bû (The Man that Only Seen World as Beautiful in His Dreams), Play, 2010.
- Hewt Wêney Rûtî Jinî Cenabî Wezîr (Seven Nude Pictures of Sir Minister's Wife), Novel, 2016.
- Zêrî Naw Zibil (Gold in Trash), Novel.
- Zar û Marekan.
- Re'îş Remezanekan.
- Çîm Dî? (What Did I See?).
- Ew Kitêbaney Jiyanyan Gorîm (The Books that Changed My Life).
- Qebrêkî Sêgoşe (A Triangular Grave), Novel, 2017.
- Kurdistan the Political Capital of Middle East.

=== Non-Fiction ===
Pirbal speaks in Kurdish language about French language.

- Încîl le Mêjûy Edebiyatî Kûrd (Bible in the History of Kurdish Literature), (1857–1957).
- Serçawekanî Kurdnasî (Sources of Kurdology), Research, 1998.
- Destpêkî Serheldanî Pexşanî Kurdî (The Beginning of the Kurdish Prose), Research, 1999.
- Jeneral Şerîf Paşa (General Sharif Pasha), Biography, 2001.
- Kronolocyay Kûrdistan (Kurdish Chronology).
- Ebdulrehîm Rehmî Hekarî (Abdulrahim Rahmi Hakary), Biography, 2002.
- Rêbaze Edebiyêkan (Literalic Movements), 2004.
- Wêney Kûrd le Erşîfî Rojhelatnasekanda (The Picture of Kurds in the Orientalists’ Archives), Research, 2005.

== See also ==
- List of Kurdish scholars
