= The Problem of the Wire Cage =

1939 novel by John Dickson Carr

- First US edition
- Author: John Dickson Carr
- Language: English
- Series: Gideon Fell
- Genre: Mystery, detective novel
- Publisher: Hamish Hamilton (UK, 1940) & Harper (USA)
- Publication date: 1939
- Publication place: United Kingdom
- Media type: Print (hardback & paperback)
- Pages: 296 pp
- OCLC: 23277911
- Preceded by: The Black Spectacles (1939) (aka The Problem of the Green Capsule)
- Followed by: The Man Who Could Not Shudder (1940)

The Problem of the Wire Cage, first published in 1939, is a detective story by John Dickson Carr featuring his series detective Gideon Fell. This novel is a mystery of the type known as a "impossible crime" mystery.

== Plot summary ==
Arrogant and obnoxious Frank Dorrance is engaged to pretty young Brenda White and frankly admits he plans to marry her for her money, or rather her guardian's money. An impoverished local solicitor is simply in love with Brenda and believes that to approach Brenda would be foolish—until the body of Frank Dorrance, found strangled near the centre of a clay tennis court, leaves the field clear. However, there was only one set of footsteps on the soft clay surface, those of the victim. The victim's arrogance gained him many enemies during his lifetime, and a number of them are on hand in the vicinity with both motive and opportunity, but the authorities are finding it difficult to prove that anyone at all could have killed Frank Dorrance. Gideon Fell must take a hand and explain a number of unusual clues, including a picnic basket heavily laden with dirty dishes that mysteriously vanish. It is not until the murder of a second victim, a trapeze artist, that the crimes are brought home to their perpetrator.
