= He Who Whispers =

1946 novel by John Dickson Carr

- First US edition cover
- Author: John Dickson Carr
- Language: English
- Genre: Mystery, detective novel
- Publisher: Hamish Hamilton (UK) & Harper (US)
- Publication date: 1946
- Publication place: United Kingdom
- Media type: Print (hardback & paperback)
- Preceded by: Till Death Do Us Part (1944)
- Followed by: The Sleeping Sphinx (1947)

He Who Whispers is a mystery novel (1946) by John Dickson Carr. Like many of the works by Carr, the book features a so-called "impossible crime". For the most part, such crimes fall into the category of locked room mysteries. In this case, the novel falls into a smaller sub-category of Carr's work in that it is suggested that the "impossible" crime is the work of a supernatural being (here, a vampire). Dr. Gideon Fell is featured as the detective. Carr considered this one of his best novels.

== Plot summary ==
A few months after the end of World War II, Miles Hammond is invited to the first meeting of the Murder Club in five years. When he arrives, no one else is there except Barbara Morell and Professor Rigaud. When no one else shows up, Rigaud tells the story of Fay Seton.

Seton was a young woman working for the Brooke family. She fell in love with Harry Brooke and the two became engaged, but Harry's father, Howard, did not approve. One day, he agreed to meet Fay in a tower—all that remained of a burned-out chateau. It was a secure location on a lonely waterfront, and was the perfect place for such a meeting. Harry and Professor Rigaud left Howard alone at ten minutes before four. When they returned, fifteen minutes later, Howard had been stabbed, and the sword-cane that did it was found in two pieces beside his body. At first it seemed an open-and-shut case, but a family that was picnicking a few feet from the entrance of the tower swore that no one entered the tower in those fifteen minutes, that no boat came near the tower, and no one could have climbed up, because the nearest window was fifteen feet off the ground. The only one with any motive was Fay Seton, who was believed to be able to bring a vampire to life and terrorize people.

Miles quickly becomes involved in the affair because the new librarian he just hired is Fay Seton.
