= Long Lost Father (novel) =

1933 novel

- First US edition
- Author: Gladys Bronwyn Stern
- Language: English
- Genre: Comedy drama
- Publisher: Alfred A. Knopf (US)
- Publication date: 1933
- Publication place: United Kingdom
- Media type: Print

Long Lost Father is a 1933 novel by the British writer Gladys Bronwyn Stern. A woman's long-lost wastrel father comes back into her life after many years absence.

== Film adaptation ==
In 1934 it was made into an American film of the same title produced by RKO Pictures. Directed by Ernest B. Schoedsack and starring John Barrymore and Helen Chandler and Alan Mowbray.

== Bibliography ==
- Goble, Alan. The Complete Index to Literary Sources in Film. Walter de Gruyter, 1999.
- Watson, George & Willison, Ian R. The New Cambridge Bibliography of English Literature, Volume 4. CUP, 1972.
