= The Arabian Nights Murder =

1936 novel by John Dickson Carr

- First US edition
- Author: John Dickson Carr
- Language: English
- Series: Gideon Fell
- Genre: Mystery, detective novel
- Publisher: Hamish Hamilton (UK) & Harper (USA)
- Publication date: 1936
- Publication place: United Kingdom
- Media type: Print (hardback & paperback)
- Pages: 317 pp (Collier Books, paperback edition, 1985)
- ISBN: 0-02-018600-2 (Collier Books, paperback edition, 1985)
- OCLC: 10949532
- Dewey Decimal: 813/.52 19
- LC Class: PS3505.A763 A88 1985
- Preceded by: The Hollow Man (1935)
- Followed by: To Wake the Dead (1938)

The Arabian Nights Murder, first published in 1936, is a detective story by John Dickson Carr featuring his series detective Gideon Fell. This novel is a mystery of the type known as a whodunnit.

== Plot summary ==
When Scotland Yard detective John Carruthers attends the Wade Museum of Oriental Art, and begins to investigate the interior of one of a series of carriages on exhibit, he is sarcastically told by the night watchman "Watch out when you touch it! There's a dead man inside!" Of course, a dead man tumbles out. The corpse has been stabbed with an elaborate Persian dagger, is wearing an obvious set of false whiskers, and is clutching a cookbook. Gideon Fell must investigate the death and explain all the bizarre circumstances of what was a very busy night at the museum.
