= In Spite of Thunder =

1960 mystery novel by John Dickson Carr

- First UK edition
- Author: John Dickson Carr
- Language: English
- Series: Gideon Fell
- Genre: Mystery, detective novel
- Publisher: Hamish Hamilton (UK) & Harper (USA)
- Publication date: 1960
- Publication place: United Kingdom
- Media type: Print (hardback & paperback)
- Pages: 186 pp (Bantam A2267, first paperback edition, 1961)
- Preceded by: The Dead Man's Knock (1958)
- Followed by: The House at Satan's Elbow (1965)

In Spite of Thunder, first published in 1960, is a detective story by John Dickson Carr which features Carr's series detective Gideon Fell. It marked Carr's 40th book in 30 years. This novel is a mystery of the type known as a locked room mystery (or more accurately a subset of that type known as an "impossible crime").

== Plot ==
Beautiful film star Eve Eden's fiancé Hector Matthews died in a strange accident while the couple was visiting Adolf Hitler at Berchtesgaden in 1939. Although he had no reason to commit suicide, he apparently flung himself off a high balcony to die hundreds of feet below—and no one was near him at the time, as the witnesses Gerald Hathaway and Paula Catford say. Years later, Eve is married to actor Desmond Ferrier and living in Geneva. Brian Innes, a painter who lives in Geneva too, is asked by his old school friend DeForrest Page to warn his daughter Audrey against continuing to associate with Eve. When Eve Ferrier appears at the Hotel du Rhône, where Innes had been dining with Sir Gerald Hathaway, she proves to be carrying a perfume bottle filled with oil of vitriol, apparently to her own surprise. The next day, when Innes is called to Eve Ferrier's villa by a desperate Audrey, he arrives in time to see Eve fall to her death from a high balcony—and no one was near her at the time. It takes the investigative genius of Gideon Fell to penetrate the ingenious murder method and reveal the criminal.

== Publication ==
As publicity for the book, the publisher "sealed off" the last section of the book, with the promise that if the reader could stop at that point and return the book to the bookseller, they would get their money back.

== Reception ==
Russell Thacher, writing in The Record, thought that as with Carr's previous books, the suspense never faltered and found his writing "as ingenious as ever". Likewise the reviewer for The Anniston Star, felt the book would prove no disappointment to fans of the series. One the other hand Bob Hill, of the Spokane Daily Chronicle, felt the book was a disappointment, with little of the "enormous gusto" of his previous offerings. He also thought that the solution was "ludicrously contrived".
