= Death Turns the Tables =

1941 novel by John Dickson Carr

- First US edition
- Author: John Dickson Carr
- Language: English
- Series: Gideon Fell
- Genre: Mystery, detective novel
- Publisher: Harper (USA, 1941) & Hamish Hamilton (UK, 1942)
- Publication date: 1941
- Publication place: United Kingdom
- Media type: Print (hardback & paperback)
- Pages: 159 pp (Berkley Medallion G281, paperback edition, 1959)
- Preceded by: The Case of the Constant Suicides (1941)
- Followed by: Till Death Do Us Part (1944)

Death Turns the Tables (1941), also published under the title The Seat of the Scornful, is a detective novel by John Dickson Carr. The novel is a mystery of the type known as a whodunnit. The story features Carr's series detective Gideon Fell, though not Carr's signature plot device of a locked-room mystery.

== Plot summary ==
Mr. Justice Ireton believes that, when presented with circumstantial evidence about a crime, he can unerringly penetrate to the truth. He also believes that he can pay off handsome Anthony Morrell to break off his engagement with the judge's daughter Constance, in the hopes that Constance will marry the judge's assistant Fred Barlow (which would very much displease wealthy society girl Jane Tennant, who loves Barlow). However, there are a few problems that will stand in the way of that arrangement; notably, that the judge is broke and Tony Morrell cannot be bought off, although he is known to enjoy exacting revenge for slights both real and imagined. When Morrell is found dead in the Iretons' seaside cottage, a great deal of circumstantial evidence points to the judge, who cannot think of how to divert suspicion. It takes Gideon Fell to make sense of some very unusual pieces of evidence, which include a piece of chewing gum and an overstuffed pillow marked "Souvenir of Canada", and determine how Tony Morrell met his death.

== Publication history ==
The novel was published in the US by Harper on November 10, 1941, under the title Death Turns the Tables. Five months later, an edition was published in Britain under the title The Seat of the Scornful. In 2022, the British Library published a new edition, also titled The Seat of the Scornful, for their Crime Classics reprint series.
