= To Wake the Dead =

1938 novel by John Dickson Carr

- First US edition
- Author: John Dickson Carr
- Language: English
- Series: Gideon Fell
- Genre: Mystery, detective novel
- Publisher: Hamish Hamilton (UK) & Harper (USA)
- Publication date: 1938
- Publication place: United Kingdom
- Media type: Print (hardback & paperback)
- Pages: 222 pp (Popular Library #10, paperback edition, 1941)
- Preceded by: The Arabian Nights Murder (1936)
- Followed by: The Crooked Hinge (1938)

To Wake the Dead, first published in 1938, is a detective story by John Dickson Carr featuring his series detective Gideon Fell. This novel is a mystery of the type known as a whodunnit.

== Plot summary ==
Christopher Kent is a wealthy young man who has made a thousand-pound bet with his friend Dan Reaper that he cannot start from Johannesburg, South Africa, without a penny in his pocket and then meet his friend at the Royal Scarlet Hotel in Piccadilly in London, England, some weeks later. Twenty-four hours before the deadline, Kent is in front of the hotel, penniless and not having eaten for a day, and decides to order breakfast and charge it to a room in the hotel. After he's finished breakfast, the hotel staff ask him to go and wake up his "wife" because a previous guest has left a valuable bracelet hidden in the room. Upon arrival at room 707, the group is met by a "Do not disturb" sign upon which has been scrawled "Dead woman"; Kent lets himself in and finds the strangled body of his cousin Josephine. When Kent asks master detective Gideon Fell to extricate him from his predicament, Fell must also solve the murder of Josephine's late husband Rodney, which had happened two weeks earlier.

The first murder had taken place at the country home of Sir Gyles Gay; Sir Gyles had acquired it from the estate of its architect, Ritchie Bellowes, and maintains Bellowes' drunkard son as a hanger-on in the household. Sir Gyles had invited a number of Kent's friends and relatives for a house party where young Bellowes entertained the party with a demonstration of his photographic memory. Late one night, while extremely drunk, Bellowes sneaks into his former home and claims to have seen a man dressed as a hotel attendant, "wearing a uniform such as you see in the big hotels like the Royal Scarlet". Bellowes passes out and is found in the morning about the same time as the strangled body of Rodney Kent is discovered.

There are a number of mysterious clues and indications, including a defaced photograph of the house party enjoying itself at a "fun fair", the fact that all the coins (but not the bills) are missing from the dead woman's purse, and two valuable bracelets, one with a mysterious Latin expression carved into its face. But it is a surprising and violent confrontation in a darkened cemetery that allows Gideon Fell to conclusively identify the murderer.
