= The Dead Man's Knock =

1958 novel by John Dickson Carr

- First UK edition
- Author: John Dickson Carr
- Language: English
- Series: Gideon Fell
- Genre: Mystery, detective novel
- Publisher: Hamish Hamilton (UK); Harper (USA)
- Publication date: August 20, 1958
- Publication place: United Kingdom
- Media type: Print (hardback & paperback)
- Pages: 265 (Zebra paperback edition, 1987)
- ISBN: 0-8217-2099-6 (Zebra paperback edition, 1987)
- OCLC: 16070938
- Preceded by: Below Suspicion (1949)
- Followed by: In Spite of Thunder (1960)

The Dead Man's Knock, first published in 1958, is a detective story by John Dickson Carr which features Carr's series detective Gideon Fell. This novel is a mystery of the type known as a locked-room mystery.

== Plot summary ==
In a little university town in the U.S. state of Virginia, surrounding Queen's College, Professor Mark Ruthven and his wife Brenda are arguing furiously because she is about to leave to meet her lover. Before the night is over, young and voluptuous Rose Lestrange will apparently walk into her bedroom and stab herself with a razor-sharp dagger—at least, that's what the police say, because the windows and door are securely locked and bolted from the inside. But Rose was being blackmailed. Is the blackmailer the same person who's been playing vicious pranks around the College's grounds, and also the murderer? Is the key to how the murder room was locked and bolted from the inside to be found in a locked-room mystery novel plotted by Wilkie Collins? It takes Dr. Fell to sort out the lies and reveal the surprising truth.
