= Gideon Fell (BBC Radio series) =

- Genre: Radio drama
- Country of origin: United Kingdom
- Language: English
- Home station: BBC Radio 4
- Starring: Donald Sinden; John Hartley
- Written by: Peter Ling
- Directed by: Enyd Williams
- Original release: 26 March 1997 – 20 January 2001
- No. of episodes: 11

Gideon Fell is a BBC Radio 4 detective series, based on the Dr. Gideon Fell stories by John Dickson Carr. Donald Sinden starred as the title character, with John Hartley recurring in the role of Superintendent Hadley. All the episodes were adapted by Peter Ling and directed by Enyd Williams.

== Episodes ==
=== The Hollow Man ===
Aired in two parts from 26 March to 2 April 1997.

Cast
- Detective Inspector Hadley – John Hartley
- Professor Charles Grimaud – Nigel Davenport
- Boyd Mangan – Chris Pavlo
- Stuart Mills – Ioan Meredith
- Ernestine Dumont – Jillie Meers
- Rosette Grimaud – Amanda Gordon
- Henry Drayman – Hugh Dickson
- Michael O'Rourke – Steve Hodson
- Jerome Burnaby – Stephen Thorne
- Pierre Fley – Sean Baker
- Sergeant Betts – Robert Harper

=== The House in Gallows Lane ===
Adapted from Till Death Do Us Part. Aired in two parts from 8 to 15 October 1997.

Cast
- Superintendent Hadley – John Hartley
- Sir Harvey Gilman – Richard Todd
- Dick Markham – Robert Portal
- Lesley Grant – Alison Pettitt
- Major Price – John Woodnutt
- Cynthia Drew – Rachel Atkins
- Lord Ashe – Michael Cochrane
- Dr. Minster – Christopher Wright
- Police Constable Bert Miller – Brian Parr

=== To Wake the Dead ===
Aired in two parts from 22 to 29 October 1997.

Cast
- Superintendent Hadley – John Hartley
- Sir Giles Gray – Richard Johnson
- Chris Kent – David Brooks
- Melita Reaper – Wendy Craig
- Dan Reaper – John Rowe
- Francine Forbes – Tracy-Ann Oberman
- Richie Bellowes – Roger May
- Kenneth Hardwick – Hugh Dickson
- Jenny Kent – Sarah Rice

=== The Blind Barber ===
Aired 5 November 1997.

Cast
- Superintendent Hadley – John Hartley
- Lord Sturton – Patrick Allen
- Captain Whistler – Clive Swift
- Curtis Warren – Mark Leake
- Peggy Glen – Laura Bazeley
- Mr Kyle – David Bannerman
- Inspector Jennings – Christopher Wright
- Ship Steward – Duncan Knowles
- Radio Operator – Josh Darcy

=== The Black Spectacles ===
Aired 9 May 1998.

Cast
- Chief Superintendent Hadley – John Hartley
- Major Crowe – Reginald Marsh
- Marjorie Wills – Yasmeen Brett
- George Harding – Andrew Wincott
- Dr. Joseph Chesney – James Taylor
- Professor Ingram – Colin Pinney
- Mr. Watkins – Christopher Wright
- Sergeant Harris – Nick Ash

=== The Mad Hatter Mystery ===
Aired 3 July 1999.

Cast
- Chief Superintendent Hadley – John Hartley
- Sir William Batten – Edward Jewesbury
- General Mason – Peter Howell
- Robert Dowery – Roger Moss
- Julius Arbor – Roger Hammond
- Yeoman Warder Parker – John Baddeley
- Henry Marsh – Anthony Jackson
- Laura Batten – Sabina Franklyn
- Lester Batten – Don McCorkindale
- Sheila Batten – Priyanga Elan

=== He Who Whispers ===
Aired 25 March 2000.

Cast
- Chief Superintendent Hadley – John Hartley
- Miles Hammond – Christopher Kelham
- Barbara Morell – Gemma Saunders
- Fay Seton – Sarah Rice
- Marion Hammond – Beth Chalmers
- Steve Curtis – David Thorpe
- Dr. Gilpin – Paul Gregory
- Frederick, the head waiter – Gavin Muir
- Hotel desk clerk – Tom George

=== Below Suspicion ===
Aired 20 January 2001.

Cast
- Chief Superintendent Hadley – John Hartley
- Patrick Butler KC – James Fleet
- Joyce Wallis – Connie Walker
- Lucia Renshaw – Becky Hindley
- Alice Griffin – Rochinda Carey
- Luke Parsons – Terrence Edmund
- Henry Lord – Mark Holloway
- George – Christopher Brennan
