= No Coffin for the Corpse =

1942 novel by Clayton Rawson

- First edition
- Author: Clayton Rawson
- Language: English
- Series: The Great Merlini
- Genre: Mystery novels
- Publisher: Little, Brown
- Publication date: 1942
- Publication place: United States
- Media type: Print (Hardback & Paperback)
- Pages: 279
- Preceded by: The Headless Lady

No Coffin for the Corpse (1942) is a whodunnit mystery novel written by Clayton Rawson.

It is the last of four mysteries featuring The Great Merlini, a stage magician and Rawson's favorite protagonist. Merlini would however, continue to appear in some short stories.

== Plot summary ==
Ross Harte, newspaperman and friend to The Great Merlini, has finally fallen in love—with Kathryn Wolff, daughter of irascible millionaire Dudley Wolff. Dudley decides to put huge obstacles in the path of Kathryn's romance, including disinheriting her. But most of his life is taken up with his investigations into the nature of death. To that end, he's filled his country estate with his second wife (a former medium), an experimental biologist, and a number of other odd characters. When a private detective decides to blackmail Wolff, he won't stand for it; he strikes the man, who falls to the floor dead. Wolff forces his hangers-on to help him bury the little man—who comes back to haunt Wolff, and forces him to call in The Great Merlini to explain the situation. Merlini has to explain a spirit photograph, a vase broken by ghostly means, Dudley's shooting, the identity of "Zareh Bey, the Man who Could Not Die", a murder by dry ice, why Ross should have been tied hand and foot and thrown into Long Island Sound, and where a professional medium can conceal a gun that no one else can. Finally Merlini works out the causes of the ghostly apparitions, identifies Dudley's murderer, and makes it possible for Harte and Kathryn to get married.

== Film, TV or theatrical adaptations ==
The 1942 movie The Man Who Wouldn't Die, starring Lloyd Nolan, was based on No Coffin for the Corpse, but the Merlini character was replaced by Michael Shayne, a popular fictional private eye at the time, created by the writer Brett Halliday.

== Critical reception ==
Mary G. McMurria of The Sunday Ledger-Enquirer wrote that the novel was "an excellent mystery and can be easily read in an afternoon or evening."
