= Long Lost Father =

1934 film by Ernest B. Schoedsack

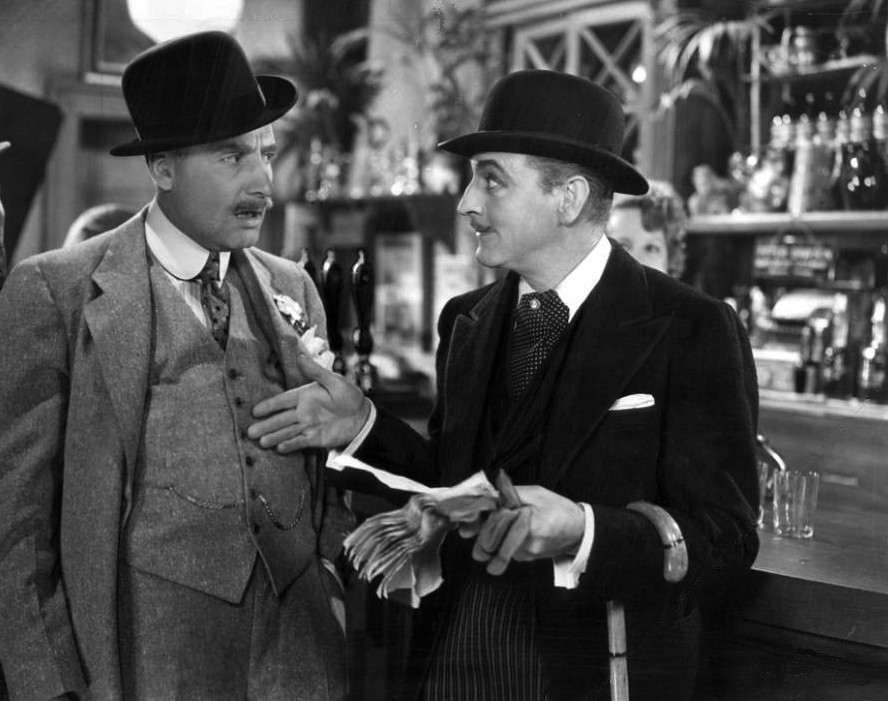
- Film still with John Barrymore and Alan Mowbray
- Directed by: Ernest B. Schoedsack
- Screenplay by: Dwight Taylor
- Based on: Long Lost Father; 1933 novel by G. B. Stern
- Produced by: Merian C. Cooper; Kenneth Macgowan
- Starring: John Barrymore; Helen Chandler
- Cinematography: Nicholas Musuraca
- Edited by: Paul Weatherwax
- Music by: Score: Alberto Columbo; Max Steiner; Roy Webb; Songs: Burton Lane (music); Harold Adamson (lyrics)
- Production company: RKO Pictures
- Distributed by: RKO Pictures
- Release date: January 19, 1934
- Running time: 63 minutes
- Country: United States
- Language: English

Long Lost Father is a 1934 American pre-Code drama film starring John Barrymore, Helen Chandler, Donald Cook, Alan Mowbray, and Doris Lloyd. It was directed by Ernest B. Schoedsack. It was based on a 1933 novel of the same title by the British writer Gladys Stern.

== Plot summary ==
A wastrel father and his long-abandoned daughter find themselves working in the same London nightclub. Gradually they come to bond and repair their broken relationship.

== Cast ==
- John Barrymore as Carl Bellairs
- Helen Chandler as Lindsey Lane
- Donald Cook as Bill Strong
- Alan Mowbray as Sir Tony Gelding
- Claude King as The Inspector
- E. E. Clive as Spot Hawkins
- Reginald Sharland as Lord Vivian
- Ferdinand Gottschalk as The Lawyer
- Natalie Moorhead as Phyllis Mersey-Royds
- Doris Lloyd as The Blonde Widow
- Phyllis Barry as Party Guest
- Tempe Pigott as Mrs. Gamp - The Old Woman
- Herbert Bunston as the Bishop
- Charles Irwin as Mr. Chisholm
- John Rogers as Mr. Arno
