= The Blind Barber =

1934 novel by John Dickson Carr

- First edition
- Author: John Dickson Carr
- Language: English
- Series: Gideon Fell
- Genre: Mystery, detective fiction
- Publisher: Hamish Hamilton (UK) & Harper & Brothers (USA)
- Publication date: 1934
- Publication place: United Kingdom
- Media type: Print (hardback & paperback)
- Preceded by: The Eight of Swords
- Followed by: Death-Watch

The Blind Barber, first published in October 1934, is a detective story by American writer John Dickson Carr, featuring his series detective Gideon Fell. It is a mystery novel of the type known as a whodunnit. This novel is generally felt to be the most humorous of Dr. Fell's adventures, somewhat echoing the farcical later adventures of Carr's Sir Henry Merrivale.

== Plot summary ==
When the ocean liner Queen Victoria arrives in Southampton harbor from New York City, mystery writer Henry Morgan disembarks hastily and calls on Dr. Fell to unfold a remarkable story of mayhem and mystery. It begins with Curtis Warren, an amateur cinematographer who also happens to be the nephew of what Morgan describes as “a Great Personage in the present American Government […] not far from F.D. himself”. One afternoon during the Queen Victoria’s voyage, Morgan and his friends Peggy Glenn and Capt. Thomassen Valvick (Ret.) are summoned to Warren’s cabin, where they find its occupant nursing a wounded cranium and thoughts of vengeance. It seems that Warren inadvertently brought some reels of film on board showing his uncle, near the end of a long dinner party, making an extremely impolite speech about his fellows among the world’s mighty, and that someone has just broken into Warren’s cabin, hit him over the head, and stolen enough of this film to cause unheard-of scandal.

The four of them soon learn that a notorious and dangerous criminal (the “Blind Barber” of the title) is believed to be on board the ship. Concluding that this is the person who stole Warren’s film, they hatch a plan to lure the thief into coming back for the rest of the loot so they can catch him or her in the act. Instead, they end up inadvertently attacking the captain of the Queen Victoria and stealing, then losing, a valuable emerald elephant – to say nothing of the dying woman they find in one of the cabins, who proceeds to apparently vanish into thin air. In attempting to unravel these complications, our heroes succeed only in creating a great many more; by the end of the voyage, Warren has been confined to the brig, the emerald elephant has inexplicably reappeared and disappeared several more times, a high-tech bug-powder gun has gone berserk, and a drunken puppeteer has started throwing the passengers’ personal goods overboard, among other events.

As Morgan relates all this, Fell, greatly amused, makes notes of sixteen clues that he labels with enigmatic phrases (“The Clue of Terse Style,” for instance). In the end, he interrupts the story to answer the doorbell; when he returns, he is carrying a brown-paper parcel that turns out, in due time, to contain the stolen film. Dr. Fell explains complacently that he’s already identified the Blind Barber to the Queen Victoria’s captain; the last two chapters show him explaining his deductions, both to Morgan and to the Barber himself.
