= The Great Merlini =

- First appearance: Death from a Top Hat
- Last appearance: The World's Smallest Locked Room
- Created by: Clayton Rawson

In-universe information
- Gender: Male
- Occupation: Magician
- Nationality: American

The Great Merlini is a fictional detective created by Clayton Rawson. He is a professional magician and amateur detective, who appears in four locked room or impossible crime novels written in the late 1930s and early 1940s, as well as in a dozen short stories.

"His chronicler, free-lance writer Ross Harte, notes that Merlini hates the New York City Subway system, beer, inactivity, opera, golf, and sleep. He is, on the other hand, highly partial to surf bathing, table tennis, puzzles, circuses, and Times Square, where he operates a magic shop. Merlini's friendly rival is Inspector Homer Gavigan of Homicide, an intelligent man who is, nonetheless, amazed by the magician's feats."

== Bibliography ==
=== Novels ===
- Death from a Top Hat (1938)
- The Footprints on the Ceiling (1939)
- The Headless Lady (1940)
- No Coffin for the Corpse (1942)

=== Short stories ===
Twelve short stories featuring Merlini were published in Ellery Queen's Mystery Magazine between 1946 and 1971. In 1979, they were collected under the title of The Great Merlini.

- The Clue of the Tattooed Man
- The Clue of the Broken Legs
- The Clue of the Missing Motive
- From Another World
- Off the Face of the Earth
- Merlini and the Lie Detector
- Merlini and the Vanished Diamonds
- Merlini and the Sound Effects Murder
- Nothing Is Impossible
- Miracles - All in the Day's Work
- Merlini and the Photographic Clue
- The World's Smallest Locked Room

== Adaptations ==
At least two movies were made based on the Merlini books. One of them, Miracles for Sale (1939), was based on Death from a Top Hat but had no character named Merlini—instead, Robert Young played "The Great Morgan". The 1942 movie The Man Who Wouldn't Die, starring Lloyd Nolan, was based on No Coffin for the Corpse, but the Merlini character was replaced by Michael Shayne, a popular fictional private eye at the time, created by the writer Brett Halliday. Merlini was shown in a brief segment where he advises Shayne, and was played by an uncredited Charles Irwin.

A 30-minute pilot for a television series was directed by Ted Post in 1951, but no further episodes were made. The Transparent Man, written by Rawson, starred Jerome Thor as The Great Merlini—who in this incarnation was a stage magician—with Barbara Cook as his assistant Julie and featuring E. G. Marshall as a criminal.
