= The Black Spectacles =

1939 novel by John Dickson Carr

- First UK edition cover
- Author: John Dickson Carr
- Original title: US title: "The Problem of the Green Capsule: being the psychologist's murder case"
- Language: English
- Series: Gideon Fell
- Genre: Mystery, detective novel
- Publisher: Hamish Hamilton (UK) & Harper (USA)
- Publication date: 1939
- Publication place: United Kingdom
- Media type: Print (hardback & paperback)
- Pages: 223 pp (International Polygonics paperback edition, 1986)
- ISBN: 0-930330-51-X (International Polygonics paperback edition, 1986)
- OCLC: 15209355
- Preceded by: The Crooked Hinge (1938)
- Followed by: The Problem of the Wire Cage (1939)

The Black Spectacles (published in the US as The Problem of the Green Capsule subtitled "Being the psychologist's murder case"), is a 1939 detective story by John Dickson Carr featuring his series detective Gideon Fell. This novel is a mystery of the type known as a locked room mystery (or more properly a subset of the locked room mystery called an "impossible crime" story).

== Plot summary ==
In the small English village of Sodbury Cross, Marjorie Wills is suspected of having poisoned some chocolates in the local tobacco-and-sweet shop, using a method pioneered by historical poisoner Christiana Edmunds. Her uncle, the wealthy Marcus Chesney, believes that eyewitnesses are unreliable. He avers that to observe something, then to relate accurately what was just seen, is impossible. In order to prove his statements, he sets up a test; three witnesses are invited to witness some staged events not only in their view but in that of a movie camera. After the events, it is planned that they will answer a list of ten questions. Marcus Chesney takes a principal role in the staged events and, during them, is fed a large green capsule containing poison by a masked and disguised figure wearing black spectacles. Amazingly, the three witnesses cannot agree upon the answers to any of the questions and no one can identify the murderer. It seems as though Chesney very carefully set up the ideal conditions for someone to murder him and escape, but Gideon Fell, upon viewing the movie footage, can answer all ten questions plus the eleventh—who is the murderer?
