= Miracles for Sale =

1939 film

- Film poster
- Directed by: Tod Browning
- Screenplay by: Harry Ruskin; Marion Parsonnet; James Edward Grant
- Based on: Death from a Top Hat by Clayton Rawson
- Produced by: J.J. Cohn
- Starring: Robert Young; Florence Rice
- Cinematography: Charles Lawton Jr.
- Edited by: Fredrick Y. Smith
- Music by: William Axt
- Distributed by: Metro-Goldwyn-Mayer
- Release date: August 14, 1939
- Running time: 71 minutes
- Country: United States
- Language: English

Miracles for Sale is a 1939 American mystery film directed by Tod Browning, and starring Robert Young and Florence Rice. It was Browning's final film as a director. The film is based on a locked-room mystery novel by well-known mystery writer Clayton Rawson, Death from a Top Hat, which was the first to feature his series detective The Great Merlini. In this film, Merlini's character has been changed into Michael Morgan (The Amazing Morgan) as portrayed by Robert Young. Don Diavolo, another series character in Rawson's work under his pseudonym, Stuart Towne, appears here as Dave Duvallo.

== Plot ==
In the late 1930s, inactive New York magician Michael "Mike" Morgan (aka "The Amazing Morgan") exposes fraudulent magicians and psychics who prey on the unsuspecting. When demonologist Dr. Sabbat is mysteriously murdered, Mike assists the police in developing suspects which include Tauro and Dave Duvallo - two magicians last seen with Sabbat; a couple named La Claire who perform tricks by telepathy; a psychic named Madame Rapport; and, a young lady named Judy Barclay who is in New York to prevent Madame Rapport from claiming a $25,000 prize offered by a local psychic association.

== Cast ==
- Robert Young as Michael 'Mike' Morgan
- Florence Rice as Judy Barclay
- Frank Craven as Dad Morgan
- Henry Hull as Dave Duvallo
- Lee Bowman as Mr. Al La Claire
- Cliff Clark as Police Inspector Marty Gavigan
- Astrid Allwyn as Mrs. Zelma La Claire
- Walter Kingsford as Colonel Herbert Watrous
- Frederick Worlock as Dr. Caesar Sabbatt (Credits) / Sabbat in Film (as Frederic Worlock)
- Gloria Holden as Madame Rapport
- William Demarest as Detective Quinn
- Harold Minjir as Tauro

== See also ==
- List of American films of 1939
