= The Footprints on the Ceiling =

1939 novel by Clayton Rawson

- First edition
- Author: Clayton Rawson
- Language: English
- Series: The Great Merlini
- Genre: Mystery novels
- Publisher: G.P. Putnam's Sons
- Publication date: May 27, 1939
- Publication place: United States
- Media type: Print (Hardback & Paperback)
- Pages: 240 pp (in Dell mapback #121)
- Preceded by: Death from a Top Hat
- Followed by: The Headless Lady

The Footprints on the Ceiling (1939) is a locked-room mystery novel written by Clayton Rawson.

It is the second of four mysteries featuring The Great Merlini, a stage magician and Rawson's favorite protagonist.

== Plot summary ==
Ross Harte, publicity writer, is investigating the person behind a classified ad seeking a haunted house for sale. When it turns out to be his old friend The Great Merlini, Harte drops by his store, The Magic Shop, looking for an explanation. Harte and Merlini are soon swept up into a complex and bizarre plot involving the death of Linda Skelton, an agoraphobic heiress, at her home on Skelton Island, a tiny island in the East River of New York City. The plot soon expands to involve a psychic researcher and his favourite medium, a group of treasure hunters seeking a sunken treasure, counterfeit golden guinea coins, a man with blue skin (argyria), a gangster named Charles Lamb, a second murder by "the bends", and a murder scene with a set of neat footprints marching across the ceiling. Merlini survives more than one attempt on his life before he can call in the police and conclusively bring the crimes home to the guilty.

== Trivia ==
The fictional Skelton Island, where the story is set, is roughly based on North Brother Island, NY. In the map included in the book, Skelton Island is shown south of the real-life North Brother Island, more or less where South Brother Island actually is.

== Critical studies and reviews ==
- Tobin, Neil (Spring 2026). "'Magical red herrings' : personalized experience and specialized knowledge in Clayton Rawson's The Footprints on the Ceiling". Clues : a journal of detection. 44 (1): 28–37.
