= Till Death Do Us Part (Carr novel) =

1944 novel by John Dickson Carr

- First US edition
- Author: John Dickson Carr
- Language: English
- Series: Gideon Fell
- Genre: Mystery, detective novel
- Publisher: Hamish Hamilton (UK) & Harper (USA)
- Publication date: 1944
- Publication place: United Kingdom
- Media type: Print (hardback & paperback)
- Pages: 214 pp (Bantam #793, paperback edition, 1990)
- Preceded by: Death Turns the Tables (1941)
- Followed by: He Who Whispers (1946)

Till Death Do Us Part, first published in 1944, is a detective story by John Dickson Carr featuring his series detective Gideon Fell. This novel is a mystery of the type known as a locked room mystery. Carr considered this one of his best impossible crime novels.

== Plot summary ==
Dick Markham is engaged to a beautiful but somewhat mysterious young woman named Lesley Grant. When they attend a cricket match in the English village of Six Ashes, they stop at the nearby fair and Lesley insists on seeing the fortune teller. She is apparently unaware that the fortune teller is being played by Sir Harvey Gilman, the Home Office pathologist and expert on crime.

After her session, Dick visits Sir Harvey. The crime expert is about to tell his visitor something unpleasant about Lesley when he is shot and wounded — accidentally, it seems — by Lesley herself. Later that night, Sir Harvey tells Dick that he recognized Lesley as a murderer who killed three husbands but was never convicted . . . because she somehow got the men to inject themselves with poison. Later that night, Sir Harvey dies in a locked and sealed room, in exactly the same fashion as the three husbands.

The famed Dr. Gideon Fell is called in to assist the investigation, and what he says after simply seeing the corpse turns the whole case upside down. The brilliant sleuth knows he is on the trail of a cunning killer with a hidden motive, but his cryptic comments leave everyone else baffled. As Fell unravels the clues, including a set of drawing pins found scattered beside the body, the murderer strikes again. Meanwhile, a desperate Dick Markham can't help wondering whether Lesley is a woman in grave danger or a threat to his life.
