= El pozo (novel) =

Novel by Juan Carlos Onetti (published 1939)

The Pit
- Author: Juan Carlos Onetti
- Original title: El pozo
- Language: Spanish
- Publisher: Arca, Montevideo
- Publication date: 1939
- Publication place: Uruguay

The Pit (Spanish: El pozo) is the debut novel by Uruguayan author Juan Carlos Onetti.

Published in 1939, the novel is written in form of a diary. Eladio Linacero, the main character, shows his scepticism for life in general.

Some literary critics trace the origins of the Latin American Boom to this novel and others, such as Ernesto Sabato's The Tunnel.

It was translated into Kurdish by Jiyar Homer.
