= The Sleeping Sphinx =

1947 detective story by John Dickson Carr

- First US edition
- Author: John Dickson Carr
- Language: English
- Series: Gideon Fell
- Genre: Mystery, detective novel
- Publisher: Hamish Hamilton (UK) & Harper (US)
- Publication date: 1947
- Publication place: United Kingdom
- Media type: Print (hardback & paperback)
- Pages: 199 pp (Bantam paperback edition, 1966)
- Preceded by: He Who Whispers (1946)
- Followed by: Below Suspicion (1949)

The Sleeping Sphinx, first published in 1947, is a detective whodunnit story by John Dickson Carr which features Carr's series detective Gideon Fell.

== Plot summary ==
Donald Holden, upon his release from the British Armed Forces, discovers that he had been pronounced as dead more than a year ago, which may complicate his love for the beautiful Celia Devereaux. When he announces the mistake to her, they are reconciled, but strange things have been happening to the Devereaux family. Celia's sister Margot died in mysterious circumstances more than a year ago, after an evening of spooky games during which each guest wore the death mask of a famous murderer. The London offices of a fortune teller have been abandoned, but someone still uses them. And someone or something has been moving the coffins around inside a sealed mausoleum. Some people think that Celia has inherited the family taint of hysteria, but it takes the combined efforts of Donald Holden and Gideon Fell to explain Margot's death and the moving coffins.
