= The Woman in the Hall =

- Directed by: Jack Lee
- Written by: Ian Dalrymple; G.B. Stern; Jack Lee
- Based on: The Woman in the Hall by G.B. Stern
- Produced by: Ian Dalrymple
- Starring: Ursula Jeans; Jean Simmons; Cecil Parker
- Cinematography: C.M. Pennington-Richards
- Edited by: John Krish
- Music by: Temple Abady
- Production company: Wessex Film Productions
- Distributed by: General Film Distributors
- Release date: 28 October 1947
- Running time: 93 minutes
- Country: United Kingdom
- Language: English
- Budget: £201,200
- Box office: £117,800

The Woman in the Hall is a 1947 British drama film directed by Jack Lee and starring Ursula Jeans, Jean Simmons, Cecil Parker. The screenplay was written by Lee, Ian Dalrymple and Gladys Bronwyn Stern, from Stern's 1939 novel of the same title.

It was the film debut of actress Susan Hampshire.

== Plot ==
Lorna Blake is a widow with two daughters. She augments her slender income by using her children to extort money, visiting the houses of the rich to tell a pathetic story and beg for help.

Lorna makes a rich capture when Sir Halmar Bernard proposes marriage to her. She tells him that she has only one daughter, Molly. When her other daughter, Jay, is arrested for forging a cheque, Lorna refuses to help her.

== Cast ==
- Ursula Jeans as Lorna Blake
- Jean Simmons as Jay
- Cecil Parker as Sir Halmar
- Edward Underdown as Neil Ingelfield
- Joan Miller as Susan
- Jill Freud as Molly Blake
- Nigel Buchanan as Toby
- Ruth Dunning as Shirley Dennison
- Russell Waters as Alfred
- Terry Randall as Ann
- Lily Khan as Baroness Von Soll
- Barbara Shaw as Mrs. Maddox
- Martin Walker as Judge
- Totti Truman Taylor as Miss Gardiner
- Hugh Pryse as Counsel for the defence
- Everley Gregg as Lady Cloy
- Alexis France as Miss Mounce
- Hugh Miller as Mr. Walker
- Susan Hampshire as young Jay
- Campbell Singer as Von Soll's servant
- Grace Denbeigh-Russell as Mrs. Phillimore
- June Elvin as Daffy
- Joan Sterndale-Bennett as shop assistant

== Production ==
It was made by Wessex Film Productions at Pinewood Studios, with sets designed by Peter Proud.

Jack Lee later recalled the experience of working for Wessex "revolted me" because "it reminded me of when I was a child and my mother would send me out on begging expeditions because she never had any money. It was a bloody awful novel and a terrible film."

== Reception ==
=== Box office ===
The producer's receipts in the UK were £97,900 and £19,900 overseas.

=== Critical ===
The Monthly Film Bulletin wrote: "This is an unusual film made with considerable originality both of story and treatment. Excellent performances from Ursula Jeans, and from Jean Simmons and Jill Raymond as her two daughters, are backed by a strong cast, and although the interior sets are not altogether convincing the film as a whole is refreshing and entertaining."

Kine Weekly wrote: "The film has a sketchy start and an inconclusive big trial scene climax, but the rest is tightly packed with clever and telling vignettes and by-play. Sound and exciting at its core, it is no small tribute to its stars and director that it holds and intrigues in spite of its failure to arrive at clear-cut conclusions. More coherent films have, oddly enough, said less. Technically, it leaves nothing to be desired."

Picture Show wrote: "Brilliantly acted and cleverly directed"

In British Sound Films: The Studio Years 1928–1959 David Quinlan rated the film as "good", writing: "Good script helps refreshingly original story."
