= The Eight of Swords =

1934 novel by John Dickson Carr

- First US edition
- Author: John Dickson Carr
- Language: English
- Series: Gideon Fell
- Genre: Mystery, detective novel
- Publisher: Hamish Hamilton (UK); Harper (USA)
- Publication date: 1934
- Publication place: United Kingdom
- Media type: Print (hardback & paperback)
- Pages: 225
- Preceded by: The Mad Hatter Mystery
- Followed by: The Blind Barber

The Eight of Swords, first published in February 1934, is a detective story by American writer John Dickson Carr, featuring his series detective Gideon Fell. It is a mystery novel of the type known as a whodunnit.

== Plot summary ==
Mr. Septimus Depping is found dead in his Gloucestershire country house, shot with his own gun and holding a card from the Tarot deck, the Eight of Swords, which stands for "condemning justice". Among those present is an Anglican bishop who is an expert in criminology, and sees wanted criminals in every parlourmaid, and Henry Morgan, who writes exciting mystery novels under two different names. Mr. Depping turns out to have been an American criminal, and Gideon Fell must penetrate the secrets of his American associates, as well as his British life in retirement in order to bring home the crime to the unlikely criminal.
