= The Headless Lady =

1940 novel by Clayton Rawson

- First edition
- Author: Clayton Rawson
- Language: English
- Series: The Great Merlini
- Genre: Mystery novels
- Publisher: G.P. Putnam's Sons
- Publication date: 1940
- Publication place: United States
- Media type: Print (Hardback & Paperback)
- Pages: 240 pp (in Dell mapback #176)
- Preceded by: The Footprints on the Ceiling
- Followed by: No Coffin for the Corpse

The Headless Lady (1940) is a whodunnit mystery novel written by American writer Clayton Rawson. A character in the novel, a detective story writer named Stuart Towne, has the same name as a pen name of Rawson. This is the third of four mysteries featuring The Great Merlini, a stage magician and Rawson's favorite protagonist.

== Plot summary ==
Beautiful young Pauline Hannum, daughter of the late Major Hannum and a performer with his circus, enters The Magic Shop run by The Great Merlini and is suspiciously willing to pay much more than the going price for the immediate delivery of a "Headless Lady" illusion. Merlini and his writer friend Ross Harte decide to investigate, drawn by Merlini's love of circuses. They soon learn that Major Hannum's death was probably a murder, and that the killer seems to have unfinished, and deadly, business that involves a real headless lady whose head has disappeared. Merlini, Harte and a new associate, detective writer Stuart Towne, soon learn a number of interesting background facts about goings-on at the circus—including why it's bad luck for the circus orchestra to play Suppé's Light Cavalry March, what the mummified body of John Wilkes Booth is composed of, and how to create fingerprints that have no loops or whorls. Merlini must use his magic skills to escape from an "escape-proof" jail, assemble the suspects, and identify the murderer in a surprising final scene.

== Critical reception ==
Maxine Garrison of The Pittsburgh Press wrote that the novel was "as absorbing an evening's reading as the mysery field is likely to offer you."
