= The Man Who Pays The Piper =

- Original language: English
- Written by: Gladys Bronwyn Stern
- Characters: Dr. Arthur Fairley; Rosie Fairley; Daryll Fairley; Rufus Waring; Benedictus Freene; Penelope Fairley; Fay Fairley; Anthea Cottenham; Scott Cottenham; Bobby; Kitty; Harry; Clive; Raymond; Powell
- Subject: Family, Money, Women, Work
- Genre: Comedy
- Setting: 1913, 1926, 1930, Holland Park, London

Premiere
- Date: 1931; 10 February 2013 (revival)
- Place: St. Martin's Theatre, London

The Man Who Pays The Piper is a 1931 English play by Gladys Bronwyn Stern. It centres on Daryll Fairley and her shifts from rebellious daughter to independent businesswoman to housewife between 1913 and 1930, described by Michael Billington in The Guardian in 2013 as "one of the best roles written for a woman between the wars". Laura Thompson of The Telegraph said that "The debate about whether a woman can 'have it all'.. does not go away. The arguments have sprung to renewed life with the publication of Facebook executive Sheryl Sandberg’s book on the subject [Lean In]. And... were being conducted just as fiercely in the early 20th century, albeit quite possibly with more sense."

== Plot summary ==
The plot spans 17 years, following the character of Daryll Fairley, and focusing especially on the relationships between gender, money, and power within a family. Paul Taylor sums up the theme, writing, "The play asks whether, regardless of gender, the controller of the family purse is bound to become an autocrat."

The play has a prologue and three acts.

In the prologue, Daryll is 18 years old, arriving home late from a dance. Her father, a doctor, scolds her for her lateness. She attempts to assert her independence, interested in work and the Suffragette movement, and wishing to be "of use". Her father reminds her that she is financially dependence on him and subject to his authority.

Act One begins thirteen years later; Daryll is 31 and her father and elder brother have died in the Great War. She has become a successful business person, directing a dressmaking firm, and supporting her sister, her mother, and her sister's and mother's feckless husbands. Although Daryll has a suitor, Rufus, whom she wants to marry, she feels unable to marry due because she is already supporting a large family, and does not want to burden a husband with her family's dependence.

Act Two explores the interplay between gender, income, and power in the household. Daryll sees herself as the family's father figure, and in a scene reminiscent of the prologue, she now plays the authoritarian breadwinner to her sister Fay "who wants all the comforts of living in the family home without any of the responsibilities." When Daryll's mother inherits significant wealth, Daryll asks Rufus to marry her make her "into the usual sort of wife".

The final act looks ahead four more years. Daryll has married and traded her business for domestic life, and feels unchallenged and unfulfilled. Despite Rufus's protestations that having them both working would be "unnatural," Daryll returns to employment to save the dress-making business.

== Reception ==
Reviewers of both the 1931 production and the 2013 revival voiced similar sentiments about the play: that the concerns driving the play were compelling, even as the writing could be stronger.

Writing about the original production, New York Times reviewer Charles Morgan said that the play "rests upon an extremely interesting idea, but the treatment of it has been falsified by theatricalism...The portrait of Daryll Fairley, though sometimes distorted by circumstance, is evidence enough of what Miss Stern can do when she yields to her own interest in her own subject and is not overmuch troubled for theatrical effect". The Times's reviewer wrote that the 1931 Daryll "is faithfully imagined and accomplished with distinction. But unhappily Miss Stern is not always content to consider character with the same quietness. She seems suddenly to remember that she is writing for the theatre and to drag in a theatrical type by the scruff of its neck." The theatricalism referred to in both reviews has to do with the characters other than Daryll who are portrayed more as caricatures than fully developed portraits. Morgan wrote that "Stern has introduced to her play characters that her taste and judgment would have excluded from a novel."

G.B. Stern had missed the first performance due to influenza but the play was purchased in August by Horace Liverlight for New York and it played in repertory through to 1938. When Stern travelled to Hollywood in 1933 she sought to interest RKO studios in making a film adaptation of the play.

Reviews of the 2013 production sounded similar notes. For The Independent, Paul Taylor wrote, "There's often too little narrative impetus but the problems the piece raises are still pertinent." Laura Thompson, reviewing for The Telegraph wrote, "Stern is no Ibsen, and she rarely says something once when she can say it three times, but although her dialogue lacks wit, her thinking does not."

Though hampered by stylistic considerations, the play's message comes through. Michael Billington writes that "the play covers a lot of territory and raises a host of issues." Thompson writes that the play "plunges into the question of whether a woman can have love, and independence, and fulfillment, and concludes that there is no honest answer."

Critic Maggie Gale attributes Daryll's independence to the social circumstances surround World War I, citing women who worked during the war and returned to the domestic sphere when the war ended. In the play, this tension over gender roles pivots around who earns the family's money. Gale writes that "one of the key questions which Daryll asks, and others ask of her, is whether she can be both economically powerful and feminine." Gale sees Stern as asserting that women need the opportunity to find fulfillment in both the public and private spheres.

== Productions ==
The play debuted in 1931 in London's West End at the St Martin's Theatre, produced by John Hastings Turner and starring Diana Wynyard as Daryll Fairley; it also featured Hilda Trevelyan as Rosie and a young Jessica Tandy as Fay, before Tandy's rise to stardom.

The play was revived by the Orange Tree Theatre in Richmond, London from 13 March to 13 April 2013 in a production directed by Helen Leblique, and starring Deirdre Mullins as Daryll. The play was part of a season that included three plays written between the World Wars; the season also featured Githa Sowerby's 1924 play The Stepmother (which also addresses women's employment) and Somerset Maugham's 1930 play The Breadwinner.

== Publication ==
The play was published in 1931 by Baker International Play Bureau.
