= Death-Watch =

1935 novel by John Dickson Carr

- Author: John Dickson Carr
- Language: English
- Series: Gideon Fell
- Genre: Mystery, detective
- Publisher: Harper & Bros.
- Publication date: 1935
- Publication place: United States
- Media type: Print (hardback & paperback)
- Preceded by: The Blind Barber
- Followed by: The Hollow Man

Death-Watch, first published in April 1935, is a detective story by American writer John Dickson Carr, featuring his series detective Gideon Fell. It is a mystery novel of the whodunnit type.

The novel's plot begins with three people standing over the body of a dead police detective, one holding a pistol. Yet, the man was stabbed to death with the hand of a clock. An eyewitness is unconscious in the back yard of the house where the murder occurred, and a dead-drunk man holds an important clue. Although the evidence points to one person, Fell is convinced someone else is responsible for the death.

== Plot summary ==
As Dr. Gideon Fell and Professor Melson walk back to Melson's rooms at Lincoln's Inn Fields, a horrific scream draws them into the home of clockmaker Johannus Carver. At the top of the stairs is a dead tramp. Standing near the body are Eleanor Carver, Calvin Boscombe, and former Chief Inspector Peter Stanley. Boscombe has a gun, but the tramp has been stabbed in the neck with the minute hand of a large clock. The tramp, in fact, is Detective-Inspector George Finley Ames, who was investigating the stabbing death of a floorwalker at a local department store.

Fell is confronted with three seemingly surreal stories. The prim Boscombe and the nerve-shattered Stanley claim they intended to play a joke on Ames, threatening to shoot him with an unloaded pistol just to see his reaction. Eleanor's boyfriend Don Hastings claims he was on the roof for a lover's tryst with Eleanor when he saw, through a skylight, Ames enter Boscombe's room and die. Neither Boscombe nor Stanley were near him, Hastings says. When he tried to climb down from the roof, he fell and was knocked unconscious. Christopher Paull, a drunkard living in the Carver home, swears that he awoke in a stupor in the middle of the night and found the murderer's blood-stained glove in the hall near the landing. In the glove was a key to the rooftop trap-door.

The murder weapon came from a large standing clock which Eleanor's guardian Johannus Carver was making for Paull's uncle. Someone broke into a locked workroom and stole both hands from the clock. Complicating matters, female solicitor Lucia Handreth (who rents a combined apartment-office on the first floor of the Carver home) and housekeeper Millicent Steffins point the finger at Eleanor Carver as the murderer.

Chief Inspector David Hadley arrives to take the case in hand. Hadley reveals that an anonymous informant had told Ames that someone in the Carver household had killed the department store worker. Ames had gone undercover as a local tramp to investigate. Fell and Hadley quickly discover that Stanley shot and killed Don Hastings' father 14 years earlier. Carlton Hope-Hastings had been accused of embezzlement; the unjustified shooting led to Stanley's dismissal from the police force. Fell and Hadley also discover that Eleanor Carver is a kleptomaniac, and in a secret compartment in her room they find the second clock hand and other highly incriminating evidence.

Hadley is convinced that Eleanor Carver impulsively killed Ames when she discovered him in the darkened house. Fell, however, is equally convinced that Eleanor Carver is being framed by the true murderer. Without any evidence to support his supposition, Fell asks an unreliable ally to help him unmask the killer.

== Literary significance and criticism ==
Death-Watch was first published by Harper & Brothers in the United States in April 1935.

This novel is the first time in which author John Dickson Carr offered the reader a solution to the crime, only to have his detective reveal the real killer at the end. As in other Gideon Fell cases, Fell lists several points which must be explained in order for the crime to be properly solved.

This is the second of 10 Dr. Gideon Fell adventures in which Chief Inspector Hadley appears. Hadley is on the verge of retirement in the case, but instead stays on and is, in fact, promoted to Superintendent for identifying the killer. Death-Watch is notable for being the only time in which Hadley relaxes around others, telling anecdotes and joking with his friends.

Carr biographer Douglas G. Greene, reviewing Death-Watch, says the novel contains several well-written set-piece scenes and has a number of memorable characters. Yet, the killer's motivation and the plot would have been better suited to an Henri Bencolin novel, he concludes, and Death-Watch is at best a flawed work.

== Sources ==
- Greene, Douglas G. (1995). John Dickson Carr: The Man Who Explained Miracles. New York: Otto Penzler. ISBN 9781883402471.
- Joshi, Sunand T. (1990). John Dickson Carr: A Critical Study. Bowling Green, Ohio: Bowling Green State University Popular Press. ISBN 9780879724771.
