= Jiyar Homer =

Kurdish translator, writer (born 1996)

- Born: May 5, 1996 (age 30); Sulaymaniyah, Kurdistan Region
- Occupation: Translator
- Writing career
- Language: Kurdish, English, Spanish, Portuguese, Arabic, Persian
- Years active: 2014 - present
- Notable works: El pozo (Juan Carlos Onetti); The Potato Eaters (Farhad Pirbal); My Father's Dogs and the Compound (Sherzad Hassan)
- Website: www.jiyarhomer.com

Jiyar Homer (born May 5, 1996) is a Kurdish literary translator and writer from Sulaymaniyah, Kurdistan Region, Iraq. He is primarily known for his literary translations to and from the Kurdish language. He is a member of the Kashkul Center at the American University of Iraq-Sulaimani and the Kurdish PEN Center in Germany. He serves as the editor-in-chief of Ilian Magazine. Homer translates to and from Kurdish mostly from Spanish, Portuguese, English, Arabic, and Persian. His translations have been published in across 30 countries in Latin America, North America, Europe, and Asia.

== Translation ==
Homer has translated Kurdish literature into Persian, English and Spanish. He has translated works of Kurdish writers from all four parts of Kurdistan for magazines, newspapers, and publishing houses in 30 countries around the world.

Homer has focused heavily on translating Latin American literature into the Kurdish language, translating the works of numerous authors including Jorge Luis Borges, Gabriel García Márquez, Julio Cortázar, Juan Rulfo, Octavio Paz, Ernesto Sabato, Carlos Fuentes, Juan Carlos Onetti, and Pablo Neruda.

== Books ==
=== Translations from Spanish into Kurdish ===
- Bir (The Pit), Juan Carlos Onetti, Kashkul Publishing House.
- Short Story Collection, Carlos Ruiz Zafón, Payk Publishing House.

=== Translations from Kurdish into Spanish ===
- Refugiado número 33333 (Refugee Number 33333), Farhad Pirbal, Gato Negro Publishing House in Mexico.

=== Translations from Kurdish into English ===
- The Potato Eaters: Stories, Farhad Pirbal, Deep Vellum Publishing in the United States.
- My Father's Dogs and the Compound, Sherzad Hassan.

== Writing and journalism ==
From 2017 to 2018, he served as the editor-in-chief of Cine-Na magazine. From 2021 to 2022, spanning four seasons, he was the head of the Sorani department for Temaşe magazine, based in Northern Kurdistan. Additionally, he has been the editor-in-chief of Ilian magazine since 2017.

In 2021, he was the translation reviewer for the English publication of classical poet Nali's poetry and served as a proofreader for a joint poetry anthology by the UNESCO Cities of Literature, Sulaymaniyah and Manchester.

== Awards and nominations ==
In the spring of 2022, the short story The Lion from Farhad Pirbal's collection The Potato Eaters, translated by Jiyar Homer and Alana Marie Levinson-LaBrosse, was published in issue 26 of Your Impossible Voice magazine. In 2023, the translation was announced as a nominee for the Best Literary Translation of the Year in the United States.
