= The Mad Hatter Mystery =

1933 novel by John Dickson Carr

- First US edition
- Author: John Dickson Carr
- Language: English
- Series: Gideon Fell
- Genre: Mystery fiction, detective fiction
- Publisher: Hamish Hamilton (UK) & Harper (USA)
- Publication date: 1933
- Publication place: United Kingdom
- Media type: Print (hardback & paperback)
- Pages: 256 (Dell #706, paperback edition, 1941)
- Preceded by: Hag's Nook
- Followed by: The Eight of Swords

The Mad Hatter Mystery, first published in 1933, is a detective story by American writer John Dickson Carr, featuring his series detective Gideon Fell. This novel is a mystery of the type known as a whodunnit.

== Plot summary ==
A young newspaperman, Philip Driscoll, is gaining notoriety by writing up a series of bizarrely inconsequential crimes in which various hats are being stolen and returned in unlikely locations; he ascribes the crimes to "the Mad Hatter". Driscoll's uncle, Sir William Bitton, is infuriated to have lost two hats in three days. He meets with Gideon Fell to discuss his possession of the manuscript of an unpublished story by Edgar Allan Poe. During the meeting, it is learned that Philip Driscoll has been found murdered at the Tower of London, with Sir William's oversized hat pushed down over his ears. After sorting out the comings and goings of Sir William's household and other visitors to the Tower, Gideon Fell must determine the fate of the manuscript and of the murderer.
