= The Case of the Constant Suicides =

1941 novel by John Dickson Carr

- First US edition
- Author: John Dickson Carr
- Language: English
- Series: Gideon Fell
- Genre: Mystery, detective novel
- Publisher: Hamish Hamilton (UK) & Harper (USA)
- Publication date: 1941
- Publication place: United Kingdom
- Media type: Print (hardback & paperback)
- Pages: 192 pp
- OCLC: 234278758
- Preceded by: The Man Who Could Not Shudder (1940)
- Followed by: Death Turns the Tables (1941)

The Case of the Constant Suicides, first published in 1941, is a detective story by John Dickson Carr. Like much of Dickson Carr's work, this novel is a locked room mystery, in addition to being a whodunnit. Unlike most of the other Dr. Fell novels, this story has a high humour level, reminiscent of the Henry Merrivale works.

== Plot summary ==
Members of a large and widespread Scottish family are brought together at a highland castle in order to resolve various pieces of family business following a death. Suspicious events soon begin to occur, the body count rises, and a verdict of suicide is not necessarily to be trusted. Enter the gargantuan Doctor Gideon Fell, who applies his substantial powers of deduction to the problem of how men can be indirectly murdered while they're inside locked, sealed and inaccessible rooms.

== Characters ==
- Gideon Fell – medical doctor and amateur detective, protagonist
- Dr. Alan Campbell (M.A. Oxon, Ph.D. Harvard) – professor of history
- Dr. Kathryn Campbell – teaches history at the Harpenden College for Women
- Dr. Colin Campbell
- Miss Elspat Campbell
- Charles E. Swan
- Alec Forbes
- Alistair Duncan
- Walter Chapman
- Jock Fleming

== Literary significance and criticism ==
"This has been called 'Carr at his best' by someone in the Saturday Review. The statement is true, for this tale offers a few characters and a few problems that are soberly and adroitly dealt with, instead of being enveloped in a mixture of highjinks and red herrings as the author likes to do with his good situations and brilliant solutions."
