= The Man Who Could Not Shudder =

1940 novel by John Dickson Carr

- First US edition
- Author: John Dickson Carr
- Language: English
- Series: Gideon Fell
- Genre: Mystery, detective fiction
- Publisher: Hamish Hamilton (UK) & Harper (US)
- Publication date: 1940
- Publication place: United Kingdom
- Media type: Print (hardback & paperback)
- OCLC: 13443298
- Preceded by: The Problem of the Wire Cage
- Followed by: The Case of the Constant Suicides

The Man Who Could Not Shudder, first published in 1940, is a detective story by American writer John Dickson Carr featuring his series detective Gideon Fell. It is mystery novel of the locked room mystery type, more properly a subset of the locked room mystery called an "impossible crime" story.

== Plot summary ==
Martin Clarke is celebrating his acquisition and refurbishment of an old stately home by inviting a number of guests to stay for the weekend. The house has an unsettling history; two decades ago, the butler, a frail man of over 80 years, was killed when he uncharacteristically decided to swing back and forth from the chandelier, which then fell and killed him. Another report features a chair which leaps off the wall at the viewer. Clarke's guests have been selected as a cross-section of "ordinary, skeptical human beings" and have been invited to investigate the rumours of ghostly hauntings. The weekend begins when, as the guests are entering the home, one woman screams and claims that something has clutched at her ankle—something "with fingers". The host immediately tells the story of a former owner of the home whose death was met with such suspicion of witchcraft from the servants that the body lay as it fell for days, and the servants reported that something seemed to clutch at their ankles. The weekend is off to a spooky start but proceeds spectacularly when three witnesses agree that a gun jumped off the wall and killed a seated guest, with no hand holding it. Famous crime-solver and debunker of impossible crimes Gideon Fell is called in to explain matters and does so in a way that leads to a spectacular and fiery finish.
