= Gideon Fell =

Fictional English amateur detective

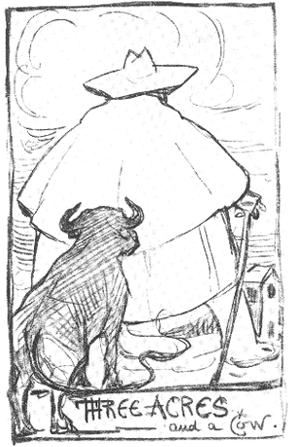
- Self-portrait of G. K. Chesterton. Dr. Fell is described as a corpulent man with a moustache who wears a cape and a shovel hat and walks with a cane.
- First appearance: Hag's Nook (1933)
- Last appearance: Fell and Foul Play
- Created by: John Dickson Carr
- Portrayed by: Finlay Currie; Donald Sinden

In-universe information
- Gender: Male
- Occupation: Lexicographer, Detective
- Nationality: British

Dr. Gideon Fell is a fictional character created by John Dickson Carr. He is the protagonist of 23 mystery novels from 1933 through 1967, as well as a few short stories. Carr was an American who lived most of his adult life in England; Dr. Fell is an Englishman who lives in the London suburbs.

Dr. Fell is supposedly based upon G. K. Chesterton (author of the Father Brown stories), whose physical appearance and personality were similar to those of Doctor Fell.

== Biography ==
Dr. Fell is a corpulent man with a moustache who wears a cape and a shovel hat and walks with the aid of two canes. His age is not specified; in his first appearance, in a 1933 novel, he is said to be "not too old" but with a kind of ancient quality about him. He is frequently described as bringing the spirit of Father Christmas or Old King Cole into a room. In his early appearances he was portrayed as a lexicographer, but this description gradually disappeared and he was thereafter mostly referred to as working on a monumental history of the beer-drinking habits of the English people.

He is an amateur sleuth, frequently called upon by the police, whom he frustrates in the usual manner of fictional detectives by refusing to reveal his deductions until he has arrived at a complete solution to the problem. The most frequently recurring police character is Chief Inspector (later Superintendent) David Hadley. Most of Fell's exploits concern the unravelling of locked room mysteries or of "impossible crimes". When he himself becomes frustrated, he is likely to cry out, "Archons of Athens!" Other favorite expressions include "O Bacchus!" and "Oh, my ancient hat!"

When Dr. Fell is not traveling, he lives with his wife in a somewhat cluttered house. The wife's name is never given, and little of her character is revealed, except that she is rather eccentric as well. She goes unmentioned in many of the books, but an allusion to her late in the series indicates that the couple's domestic life is unchanged. The Fells have no children.

Chapter 17 of the novel The Three Coffins contains Dr. Fell's "locked room lecture", in which he delineates many of the methods by which apparently locked-room or impossible-crime murders might be committed. In the course of his discourse, he states, off-handedly, that he and his listeners are, of course, characters in a book.

== Chronology ==
1. 1933, Hag's Nook
2. 1933, The Mad Hatter Mystery
3. 1934, The Eight of Swords
4. 1934, The Blind Barber
5. 1935, Death-Watch
6. 1935, The Hollow Man (The Three Coffins)
7. 1936, The Arabian Nights Murder
8. 1937, To Wake the Dead
9. 1938, The Crooked Hinge
10. 1939, The Black Spectacles (The Problem of the Green Capsule/Mystery in Limelight)
11. 1939, The Problem of the Wire Cage
12. 1940, The Man Who Could Not Shudder
13. 1941, The Case of the Constant Suicides
14. 1941, Death Turns the Tables (The Seat of the Scornful)
15. 1944, Till Death Do Us Part
16. 1946, He Who Whispers
17. 1947, The Sleeping Sphinx
18. 1949, Below Suspicion
19. 1958, The Dead Man's Knock
20. 1960, In Spite of Thunder
21. 1965, The House at Satan's Elbow
22. 1966, Panic in Box C
23. 1967, Dark of the Moon
24. 1991, Fell and Foul Play (collection of short stories and radio scripts)

== Adaptations ==
=== Television ===
The Seat of the Scornful was adapted as a 1956 episode of the BBC Sunday Night Theatre. Fell was portrayed by Finlay Currie.

Till Death Do Us Part was adapted for Italy's RAI network in 1982. Titled Tre colpi di fucile, Fell was played by Giampiero Albertini.

=== Radio ===
Fell appeared in several original BBC radio dramas written by Carr. The first was a three-part serial, Who Killed Matthew Corbin? broadcast on 7 December 1939 (part 1), 7 January 1940 (part 2) and 14 January 1940 (part 3). This was followed a month later by The Black Minute broadcast on 14 February 1940 and then The Devil in the Summerhouse broadcast on 14 October 1940. These starred Gordon McLeod as Fell.

Fell returned in The Dead Sleep Lightly broadcast by the BBC on 23 August 1943, voiced by Milton Rosmer. Carr's The Clock Strikes Eight (which includes a clue recycled from Who Killed Matthew Corbin?) was broadcast on 18 May 1944, for the anthology series Appointment with Fear. Richard George played Fell.

In 1946, Abraham Sofaer played Fell in another version of The Devil in the Summer House for the BBC Light Programme. The story was again adapted in 1947 with Julian Mitchell.

In 1959, The Hollow Man was adapted for Saturday Night Theatre, with Norman Shelley as Fell.

Donald Sinden played Dr. Fell in a series of eight BBC Radio adaptations of Carr's novels from 1997 to 2001.
