= The Woman in the Hall (novel) =

1939 novel

- First edition
- Author: Gladys Bronwyn Stern
- Language: English
- Genre: Drama
- Publisher: Cassell; Macmillan (US)
- Publication date: 1939
- Publication place: United Kingdom
- Media type: Print

The Woman in the Hall is a 1939 novel by the British writer Gladys Bronwyn Stern. The lifestyle of a confidence trickster mother has a psychologically disturbing effect on her daughter who she uses as an essential part in her various swindles.

== Film adaptation ==
In 1947 it was adapted into a British film of the same title directed by Jack Lee and starring Ursula Jeans, Jean Simmons and Cecil Parker.

== Bibliography ==
- Goble, Alan. The Complete Index to Literary Sources in Film. Walter de Gruyter, 1999.
- Watson, George & Willison, Ian R. The New Cambridge Bibliography of English Literature, Volume 4. CUP, 1972.
