= The Hollow Man (Carr novel) =

1935 novel by John Dickson Carr

- First UK edition
- Author: John Dickson Carr
- Language: English
- Series: Gideon Fell
- Genre: Mystery, detective
- Publisher: Hamish Hamilton (UK) & Harper (USA)
- Publication date: 1935
- Publication place: United Kingdom
- Media type: Print
- Pages: 303
- Preceded by: Death-Watch (1935)
- Followed by: The Arabian Nights Murder (1936)

The Hollow Man (The Three Coffins in the USA) is a 1935 locked room mystery novel by the American writer John Dickson Carr, featuring his recurring investigator Gideon Fell. It contains in chapter 17 the often-reprinted "locked room lecture" in which Dr Fell speaks directly to the reader, setting out the various ways in which murder can be committed in an apparently locked room or otherwise impossible situation.

The book received high praise from many critics, and in 1981 was selected as the best locked-room mystery of all time by a panel of 17 mystery authors and reviewers.

== Plot ==
Professor Charles Grimaud's meeting with friends at a London tavern is interrupted by the illusionist Pierre Fley, who threatens Grimaud and warns of an even more dangerous brother who seeks Grimaud's life. Grimaud tells him to send his brother and be damned.

A few nights later, a visitor concealing his identity with a false face arrives at Grimaud's house and is shown up to his study by the housekeeper, Mme Dumont. Grimaud's secretary, positioned with a view of the study door, sees Grimaud greet the visitor and let him in; he continues to watch until a shot is heard. Inside the room, Grimaud is found to be dying; but neither visitor nor weapon can be found, and there is unbroken snow outside the only window. On his deathbed, Grimaud makes a confusing statement stating that his brother was responsible.

Gideon Fell discovers that before Grimaud settled in London he was known as Károly Grimaud Horváth, and that he had two brothers, one of whom now calls himself Fley. The three had, years earlier, tried to escape a Transylvanian labour camp by faking their own deaths and being buried alive in their coffins.

A newspaper reports that minutes after Grimaud's shooting witnesses saw Fley walking alone down a snow-covered cul-de-sac, and heard a voice shout "The second bullet is for you!" followed by a gunshot. Fley is found dead in the snow, with the revolver that had killed both him and Grimaud lying nearby. There are no tracks in the snow but his.

Fell receives word from Transylvania that the three brothers had been imprisoned for bank robbery, and that after escaping his coffin Grimaud had deliberately left the other two to die. Fley had been saved and returned to prison, but the third brother had perished.

Fell concludes that Fley had been blackmailing Grimaud and threatening to disclose his part in the third brother's death. It was Grimaud who had in retaliation been planning to kill Fley, not vice versa. Grimaud had carefully constructed the illusion that Fley had gone into the study, fired at him, then escaped from the window and returned to his own flat to commit suicide.

In fact, Grimaud had gone to Fley's flat, shot him, posed him as a suicide with the gun in his hand, then put on a cardboard overcoat and mask ready to impersonate his own visitor. But his plan went awry as Fley had not been killed outright, and managed to get out into the street to seek a doctor. When Grimaud accidentally showed himself, Fley screamed, "The second bullet is for you!" and fired, dying from the effort. Though wounded, Grimaud managed to return to his own house and proceeded with his plan. He had previously positioned a large mirror just inside the study door, and as the door was opened he removed his hat and mask making it appear to the watching secretary that he was already in the room and was coming forward to greet his visitor. Once inside, he burned the cardboard items and hid the heavy mirror up in the chimney, the effort bringing on a final haemorrhage. He had just enough time to set off a firecracker to fake a gunshot.

The seeming impossibility of the crimes arose entirely by accident. Fley's shooting appeared to happen some minutes after Grimaud's because of an incorrectly set clock in a shop window; and Grimaud had not anticipated snow, making Fley's purported escape from the window impossible.

Mme Dumont (now revealed to be Grimaud's accomplice and lover) confirms the correctness of Fell's solution, and kills herself.

== Principal characters ==
- Dr Gideon Fell: investigator
- Professor Charles Vernet Grimaud: the victim
- Rosette Grimaud: his daughter
- Pierre Fley: his brother; illusionist
- Mme Ernestine Dumont: Grimaud's housekeeper
- Stuart Mills: Grimaud's secretary
- Hubert Drayman: Grimaud's bookkeeper
- Anthony Pettis: collector of ghost stories
- Jerome Burnaby: painter and amateur criminologist
- Boyd Mangan: journalist
- Ted Rampole: Fell's friend (who provides the main narrative viewpoint)
- David Hadley: police inspector

== Locked room lecture ==
The novel has become noteworthy for the "locked room lecture" of chapter 17, Dr Fell's explanation to the reader of the various ways a person can commit a near-perfect murder in an apparently locked room or otherwise impossible situation. In their Catalogue of Crime (2nd edn 1982), Barzun and Taylor note that this lecture is very good indeed: "twenty pages of sound reasoning and fine imagination in lively words". They consider that the book deserves a permanent place on one's shelf for this lecture alone.

In The Story of Classic Crime in 100 Books (2017) Martin Edwards called this chapter, in which Dr Fell admits candidly that he is a character in a novel, "an extraordinarily bold move". Edwards notes that the chapter has been reprinted many times as a stand-alone essay and that its analysis of various locked room scenarios has never been surpassed.

== Literary significance and criticism ==
Barzun and Taylor liked the story itself rather less than the lecture. While acknowledging that the plot is ingenious, they considered the characters to be "not even credible puppets" and Dr Fell to be "a dull dog". They also criticised the excessive problems of impossibility, and the need for the reader to accept "one hairline adjustment after another".

Many other critics took a completely different view, and the book was selected in 1981 as the best locked room mystery of all time by a panel of 17 mystery authors and reviewers. Martin Edwards in 2017 called the book "remarkably assured", with a dazzling first paragraph. He particularly praised the author's craft and originality, his flair for creepy atmosphere, and the deft touches of his vivid descriptions.

The book was placed at No 40 on the Crime Writers' Association's list of The Top 100 Crime Novels of All Time and No 96 on the Mystery Writers of America's Top 100 Mystery Novels of All Time.

The book is repeatedly referenced by name in the film Wake Up Dead Man, and a copy of the book showing the UK edition's cover are shown twice onscreen. At one point, one of film's main characters recreates most of the "locked room lecture" on-screen.

== Bibliography ==
- Barzun, Jacques; Taylor, Wendall Hertig (1989). A Catalogue of Crime (2nd ed.). New York: Harper & Row. ISBN 0-06-015796-8.
- Edwards, Martin (2017). The Story of Classic Crime in 100 Books. London: The British Library. ISBN 978-0-7123-5696-1.
