= Gladys Bronwyn Stern =

British writer (1890–1973)

Gladys Bronwyn Stern (17 June 1890 – 20 September 1973) or G. B. Stern, born Gladys Bertha Stern in London, England, wrote many novels, short stories, plays, memoirs, biographies and literary criticism.

== Career ==
GB Stern was born on 17 June 1890 in North Kensington, London, the second, by some years, of two sisters. Her family lost their money in the Vaal River diamond crash. After that, they lived in a series of apartments, hotels and boarding houses. Gladys was schooled in England until the age of 16, when, with her parents, she travelled to Continental Europe and studied in Germany and Switzerland.

She wrote her first novel, Pantomime, in 1914 at the age of 24. Her first critical success came with Twos and Threes in 1916. Her most popular books were the series known by the name of the first, The Matriarch. This was first published as Tents of Israel in 1924. The others in the series are A Deputy Was King (1926), Mosaic (1930), Shining and Free (1935) and The Young Matriarch (1942).

The Matriarch series revolved around the Rakonitz and Czelovar families and were based on her own family. They are well-to-do and cosmopolitan Jews who settled in England from Hungary, Poland, Russia, and Austria. Like her family, they suffer through an economic crash.

The first book in the series, The Matriarch, centres around two characters, the matriarch Anastasia and her granddaughter, Toni. Anastasia was based on Stern's great-aunt, who was incensed with the portrayal until the book became successful. The book describes in detail the complicated, florid and noisy life of this Jewish-English family through both triumphs and failures, weddings and funerals.

Stern's plays include The Man Who Pays The Piper (1931), which was revived by the Orange Tree Theatre in Richmond, London in 2013.

With Sheila Kaye-Smith she wrote the dialogues Talking of Jane Austen and More Talk of Jane Austen. She also wrote a biography of Robert Louis Stevenson and edited volumes of his works. Her final novel, Promise Not to Tell, was published in 1964.

In 1934, Long Lost Father was adapted into a film of the same title by RKO Pictures. In 1947, The Woman in the Hall was released as a film of the same title. In 1966 her 1938 novel The Ugly Dachshund was made into a film of the same title.

== Personal life ==
She married New Zealander Geoffrey Lisle Holdsworth in 1919 and petitioned for divorce in 1932. Her closest male friends were the playwright John van Druten and Jack Cohen. A long-time friend was Rebecca West, who came to call her "Peter", as did most of Stern's friends. In her memoirs Stern explains how she worked by dictating her stories to her secretaries. Freda Bromhead was with her five years with her and came back to help her years later when Stern was in a nursing home.

Her family was never terribly religious and Stern herself disliked the word 'Jew' and preferred 'Israelite'. In 1947 she converted to Catholicism. She wrote about the conversion in 1954 in All in Good Time.

She died in Wallingford, Oxfordshire, England on 28 September 1973, at the age of 83.

The National Portrait Gallery, London holds four portraits of her.

== Works ==
The following is a list of her various works:

=== Plays ===
- The Man Who Pays The Piper. A play in a prologue and three acts (1931)
- The Matriarch. A play in a prologue and three acts [1931]
- Gala Night at ‘The Willows.' A comedy in one act [with Rupert Croft Cooke] (1950)
- Raffle for a Bedspread. A one-act play for women only (1953)

=== Novels ===
- Pantomime (1914)
- See-Saw (1914)
- Two and Threes (1916)
- Grand Chain (1917)
- A Marrying Man (1918)
- Children of No Man's Land (1919)
- Larry Munro (1920)
- The Room (1922)
- The Back Seat (1923)
- Tents of Israel [US: The Matriarch] (1924)
- Thunderstorm (1925)
- A Deputy Was King (1926)
- The Dark Gentleman (1927)
- Debonair: The Story of Persephone (1928)
- Petruchio [US: Modesta] (1929)
- Mosaic (1930)
- The Shortest Night (1931)
- Little Red Horses (1932)
- The Rakonitz Chronicles (1932)
- The Rueful Mating (1932)
- Long Lost Father (1933)
- The Augs, An Exaggeration [US: 'Summer's Play'] (1933)
- Shining and Free (1935)
- Oleander River (1937)
- The Ugly Dachshund. 1938.
- The Woman in the Hall (1939)
- A Lion in the Garden (1940)
- Dogs in an Omnibus (1942)
- The Young Matriarch (1942)
- The Reasonable Shores (1946)
- No Son of Mine (1948)
- A Duck to Water (1949)
- Ten Days of Christmas (1950)
- The Donkey Shoe (1952)
- Johnny Forsaken (1954)
- For All We Know (1955)
- Seventy Times Seven (1957)
- The Patience of a Saint (1958)
- Unless I Marry (1959)
- Credit Title (1961)
- Dolphin Cottage (1962)
- Promise Not to Tell (1964)

=== Short stories ===
- Smoke Rings (1923)
- Jack a'Manory (1927)
- Gemini (1929)
- The 1865 (1929)
- Empty Tables (1929)
- Sanctuary (1929)
- A Man and His Mother (1929)
- Lady Falconbridge (1929)
- English Earth (1929)
- Quiet Corner (1929)
- The Road (1929)
- Roulette (1929)
- Echo from Ithaca (1929)
- Toes Unmasked (1929)
- The Slower Judas (1929)
- The Sleeping Beauty (1934)
- Pelican Walking (1934)
- The Hazard of the Spanish Horses (1937)
- Long Story Short (1939)

=== Biography and literary criticism ===
- The Happy Meddler [With Geoffrey Holdsworth] (1926)
- The Slower Judas (1929)
- Talking of Jane Austen [With Sheila Kaye-Smith] (1943)
- More Talk of Jane Austen [With Sheila Kaye-Smith] (1949)
- R. L. S. An omnibus [Edited and introduced by G.B. Stern] (1950)
- Selected Poems of Robert Louis Stevenson [Edited and introduced by G.B. Stern] (1950)
- Tales and Essays of Robert Louis Stevenson [Edited and with an introduction by G. B. Stern] (1950)
- Robert Louis Stevenson (1952)
- He Wrote Treasure Island. The Story of Robert Louis Stevenson (1954)
- The Patience of a Saint or, Example is Better Than Precept (1958)
- Bernadette [Illustrated by Drake Brookshaw] (1960)

=== Autobiography, memoirs ===
- Bouquet (1927)
- Monogram (1936)
- Another Part of the Forest (1941)
- Trumpet Voluntary (1944)
- Benefits Forgot (1949)
- A Name to Conjure With (1953)
- All in Good Time (1954)
- The Way It Worked Out: A Sequel to All in Good Time (1956)
- And Did He Stop and Speak to You? (1957)
- One Is Only Human (1960)

== Sources ==
- G. B. Stern at the Internet Speculative Fiction Database
