= Clayton Rawson =

American mystery writer (1906–1971)

- Born: Clayton Ashley Rawson; August 15, 1906; Elyria, Ohio
- Died: March 1, 1971 (aged 64); Mamaroneck, New York
- Education: Ohio State University
- Occupation: Author
- Spouse: Catherine Stone (m. 1929)
- Children: Hugh Rawson (1936–2013), 3 others
- Writing career
- Genre: Mystery

Clayton Rawson (August 15, 1906 – March 1, 1971) was an American mystery writer, editor, and amateur magician. His four novels frequently invoke his great knowledge of stage magic and feature as their fictional detective The Great Merlini, a professional magician who runs a shop selling magic supplies. He also wrote four short stories in 1940 about a stage magician named Don Diavolo, who appears as a minor character in one of the novels featuring The Great Merlini. "Don Diavolo is a magician who perfects his tricks in a Greenwich Village basement where he is frequently visited by the harried Inspector Church of Homicide, either to arrest the Don for an impossible crime or to ask him to solve it."

== Life and career ==
Rawson was born in Elyria, Ohio, the son of Clarence D. and Clara (Smith) Rawson. He became a magician when he was 8 years old. He married Catherine Stone in 1929, the same year he graduated from Ohio State University, and they had four children. He moved to Chicago and worked there as an illustrator.

His first novel, Death from a Top Hat, appeared in 1938.

He was one of the four founding members of the Mystery Writers of America, which presents the annual Edgar Awards in various categories of mystery writing. All of his novels were written before the founding of this group, but in 1949 and 1967 Rawson received Special Edgar Awards for his various contributions to mystery writing and the MWA, including the founding of the organization's first newsletter, "The Third Degree". Rawson is also credited with writing the organization's first slogan: "Crime Does Not Pay—Enough".

Rawson was widely admired by his mystery-writing colleagues, and John Dickson Carr, master of "impossible crime" stories, dedicated the 1965 novel "The House at Satan's Elbow" to him. Rawson was managing editor of Ellery Queen's Mystery Magazine between 1963 and his death in the United Hospital, Port Chester, N.Y., in 1971.

Rawson's burial was apparently in New York. Sometime between 2006 and 2011, his name was inscribed on his parents' double gravestone at a cemetery in Elyria, Lorain County, Ohio, noting the family connection and honoring a hometown boy who achieved fame. However, he is not buried there. The date of his death in this added inscription is incorrectly listed as 1970.

== Works on the screen ==
At least two movies were made based on the Merlini books. One of them, Miracles for Sale (1939), was based on Death from a Top Hat but had no character named Merlini. Instead, Robert Young played the character as "The Great Morgan". The movie The Man Who Wouldn't Die (1942), starring Lloyd Nolan, was based on No Coffin for the Corpse, but the Merlini character was replaced by Michael Shayne, a popular fictional private eye at the time, created by the writer Brett Halliday.

A 30-minute pilot for a television series was created in 1951, but no further episodes were made. The Transparent Man, written by Rawson, starred Jerome Thor as The Great Merlini — who in this incarnation was a stage magician — with Barbara Cook as his assistant Julie, and featuring E. G. Marshall as a criminal.

== Bibliography ==
=== As Clayton Rawson ===
==== Mystery novels ====
- Death from a Top Hat (1938)
- The Footprints on the Ceiling (1939)
- The Headless Lady (1940)
- No Coffin for the Corpse (1942)

==== Short story collections ====
- The Great Merlini (1979)
  - The Clue of the Tattooed Man
  - The Clue of the Broken Legs
  - The Clue of the Missing Motive
  - From Another World
  - Off the Face of the Earth
  - Merlini and the Lie Detector
  - Merlini and the Vanished Diamonds
  - Merlini and the Sound Effects Murder
  - Nothing Is Impossible
  - Miracles - All in the Day's Work
  - Merlini and the Photographic Clue
  - The World's Smallest Locked Room

==== Other books ====
- Scarne on Dice (1945) (with John Scarne)
- Al Baker's Pet Secrets (1951) (with Albert Baker)

==== Short stories ====
- The Clue of the Tattooed Man. Ellery Queen's Mystery Magazine, December 1946. Story published without a solution as a competition for readers; solution published Ellery Queen's Mystery Magazine, March 1947. Collected in The Great Merlini
- The Clue of the Broken Legs. Ellery Queen's Mystery Magazine, January 1947. Story published without a solution as a competition for readers; solution published Ellery Queen's Mystery Magazine, April 1947. Collected in The Great Merlini
- The Clue of the Missing Motive. Ellery Queen's Mystery Magazine, February 1947. Story published without a solution as a competition for readers; solution published Ellery Queen's Mystery Magazine, May 1947. Collected in The Great Merlini
- The Case of the Stuttering Sextant. Ellery Queen's Mystery Magazine, March 1947. (with Baynard Kendrick)
- From Another World. Ellery Queen's Mystery Magazine, June 1948. Collected in The Great Merlini
- Pictures Don't Lie. Leaflet published with a jigsaw puzzle (1949). Reprinted as Merlini and the Photographic Clue. Ellery Queen's Mystery Magazine, August 1969. Collected in The Great Merlini
- Off the Face of the Earth. Ellery Queen's Mystery Magazine, September 1949. Collected in The Great Merlini
- Merlini and the Lie Detector. Ellery Queen's Mystery Magazine, July 1955. Story published without a solution as a competition for readers; solution published Ellery Queen's Mystery Magazine, October 1955. Collected in The Great Merlini
- Merlini and the Vanished Diamonds. Ellery Queen's Mystery Magazine, October 1955. Story published without a solution as a competition for readers; solution published Ellery Queen's Mystery Magazine, December 1955. Collected in The Great Merlini
- Merlini and the Sound Effects Murder. Ellery Queen's Mystery Magazine, December 1955. Story published without a solution as a competition for readers; solution published Ellery Queen's Mystery Magazine, March 1956. Collected in The Great Merlini
- Nothing Is Impossible. Ellery Queen's Mystery Magazine, July 1958. Collected in The Great Merlini. Reprinted in The Locked Room Reader: Stories of Impossible Crimes and Escapes, edited by Hans S Santesson
- Miracles - All in the Day's Work. Ellery Queen's Mystery Magazine, October 1958. Collected in The Great Merlini
- The World's Smallest Locked Room. Ellery Queen's Mystery Magazine, August 1971. Collected in The Great Merlini

==== Uncollected short stories ====
- Dotty Joins a Lodge. College Life, April 1931
- Dotty Has Heart Trouble. College Life, May 1931
- Dotty Gets Her Man. College Life, Summer 1931
- Dotty Hunts Pirate Gold. College Life, September 1931
- Dotty Back to Bloop!. College Life, October 1931
- Dotty’s Diary. College Life, October 1932
- Dotty at a Night Club. College Life, December 1932
- The Deadly Clown. Detective Fiction Weekly 14 September, 21 September, 28 September, 5 October, 12 October and 19 October 1940

=== As The Great Merlini ===
==== Non-fiction ====
- How to Entertain Children with Magic You Can Do (1963)
- The Golden Book of Magic: Amazing Tricks for Young Magicians (1964)

=== As Stuart Towne ===
==== Short story collections ====
- Death out of Thin Air (1941)
  - Death from the Past: Ghost of the Undead
  - Death from the Unseen: Death Out of Thin Air
- Death from Nowhere (1943)
  - Act I: The Claws of Satan
  - Act II: The Enchanted Dagger
- The Magical Mysteries of Don Diavolo (2005)
  - Ghost of the Undead
  - Death from Thin Air
  - The Claws of Satan
  - The Enchanted Dagger
  - Stand-In for a Kill
  - Mr. Mystery
  - The Man with the Radio Mind
  - Ace of Death
  - The Man with X-Ray Eyes

==== Short stories ====
- Ghost of the Undead. Red Star Mystery, June 1940. Collected in Death out of Thin Air
- Stand-in for a Kill. Detective Fiction Weekly, 8 June 1940. Collected in The Magical Mysteries of Don Diavolo
- Mr Mystery. Detective Fiction Weekly, 3 August 1940. Collected in The Magical Mysteries of Don Diavolo
- Death Out of Thin Air. Red Star Mystery, August 1940. Collected in Death out of Thin Air
- The Claws of Satan. Red Star Mystery, October 1940. Collected in Death from Nowhere
- Enchanted Dagger. Red Star Mystery, December 1940. Collected in Death from Nowhere
- The Man with the Radio Mind. Detective Fiction Weekly, 2 August 1941. Collected in The Magical Mysteries of Don Diavolo
- The Ace of Death. Detective Fiction, 24 January 1942. Collected in The Magical Mysteries of Don Diavolo
- The Man with X-Ray Eyes. New Detective Magazine, March 1944. Collected in The Magical Mysteries of Don Diavolo

==== Uncollected short stories ====
- The Murder from the Grave. This story was announced for publication in Red Star Mystery, February 1941, which was never published

== Tricks ==
=== As Clayton Rawson ===
- The Card from Hell. The Jinx No. 46, 1938
- The Camel and the Needle's Eye. The Jinx No. 46, 1938
- The Force That Couldn't Be Done. The Jinx No. 46, 1938
- Behind That Door! The Jinx, Summer Extra, 1938
- Puzzle From a Top Hat The Jinx, Summer Extra, 1938
- Sixth Finger Card Rise. The Jinx No. 78, 1940
- Mass Production The Jinx No. 110, 1940
- Ghost Writer. The Jinx No. 147, 1941
- Scrambled Thoughtwaves. The Phoenix No. 3, 1942
- Card Switch. The Phoenix No. 3, 1942
- Out of the Smoke. The Phoenix No. 11, 1942 (with Dave Spindell). Reprinted in The Best in Magic (1956)
- No Corpse for the Coffin. The Phoenix No. 14, 1942
- Twist for Ring and String. The Phoenix No. 25, 1942
- The Cockeyed Cards. Prepared Cards and Accessories: Miracle Methods No. 3 (1942). Reprinted in The Living End (1972)
- The Force That Couldn't Be Done. Full Deck of Impromptu Card Tricks (1943)
- Slate Sleights. The Phoenix No. 35, 1943
- The Backward Ghost. The Phoenix No. 37, 1943
- A Sucker Bet. The Phoenix No. 50, 1943
- Page Force. The Phoenix No. 81, 1945 (with Ronald B Edwards)
- Detail Does It. The Phoenix No. 86, 1945 (with Kolmar)
- The Mental Broadcast. My Best (1945)
- The Force That Couldn't Be. Card Control(1946) (with Arthur H Buckley)
- Double-Lift Deceptions. The Phoenix No. 100, 1946. Reprinted in The Best in Magic (1956)
- 1: Right in front of Your Nose!. The Phoenix No. 100, 1946. Reprinted in The Best in Magic (1956)
- 2: Magic Taught in One Easy Lesson. The Phoenix No. 100, 1946. Reprinted in The Best in Magic (1956)
- 3: Stream-Lined Hypnotism. The Phoenix No. 100, 1946. Reprinted in The Best in Magic (1956)
- 4: The Absent-Minded Spectator. The Phoenix No. 100, 1946. Reprinted in The Best in Magic (1956)
- Strip Tease. The Phoenix No. 124, 1947
- Everyone Take a Card. The Phoenix No. 129, 1947
- The Force That Couldn't Be Done. The Phoenix No. 133, 1947
- Under the Table. The Phoenix No. 170, 1949
- In One Second Flat. The Phoenix No. 196, 1950
- Magic Scheme. Scarne on Card Tricks (1950)
- The Impossible Force. The Secret Ways of Al Baker (1951)
- Rawson Card Reading. Tarbell Course in Magic - Volume 6 (1954)
- The 90 Per Cent Perfect Change. Professional Card Magic (1961) (with Cliff Green)
- Etcetera. The Pallbearers Review Vol. 2, No. 10 (1967) (with Fred G Taylor and Jack Avis)
- Thumb Count Double Lift. The Pallbearers Review Vol. 3, No. 11 (1968)
- Magic Shuffle Variation. The Living End (1972)
- Name Your Poison. The Living End (1972)
- Further Ideas. The Pallbearers Review Vol. 9, No. 6 (1974) (with Martin Gardner)
- Date Sense. The Compleat Magick Vol. II, Issue 161 (with Walter B Gibson and Jerry Ross) (1976)
- Rawson Transit. The Fred Braue Notebooks, Issue 4 (1985)
- Simon Says. Self-Working Close-up Card Magic (with Karl Fulves)
- Little Wonder Thought Projector. The Fred Braue Notebooks, Issue 8 (1997)
- Clayton Rawson. Magic Page by Page (2011) (with Patrick Page)

=== As The Great Merlini ===
- Name Your Poison. The Jinx No. 132, 1941

== Works featuring Clayton Rawson as a character ==
=== Short stories ===
- The 51st Sealed Room by Robert Arthur. Collected in Tantalising Locked Room Mysteries (1982), edited Isaac Asimov, Charles Harry Waugh and Martin Harry Greenberg
