= 1934 in literature =

This article contains information about the literary events and publications of 1934.

== Events ==
- January 7 – The first Flash Gordon comic strip is created and illustrated by Alex Raymond and published in the United States.
- January 25 – James Joyce's novel Ulysses, after a December acquittal (upheld on appeal in February) in United States v. One Book Called Ulysses, is first published in an authorized edition in the Anglophone world by Random House of New York City. It has 12,000 advance sales.
- January – B. Traven's novel The Death Ship (Die Totenschiff, 1926) first appears in English.
- February – Stefan Zweig flees Austria and settles in London.
- February 6 – The February 6 riots in France, partly provoked by a performance of Shakespeare's Coriolanus by the Comédie-Française, will become the focus of a cult in the works of far-right authors, notably Death on Credit by Louis-Ferdinand Céline (1936) and Gilles by Pierre Drieu La Rochelle (1939). Also in 1934, Drieu announces his conversion to fascism, with the essay Socialisme fasciste.
- March 16 and October 5 – P. G. Wodehouse's Thank You, Jeeves and Right Ho, Jeeves, the first full-length novels to feature Jeeves, are published.
- April – F. Scott Fitzgerald's fourth and final completed novel, Tender Is the Night, appears in book form in New York, after serialization since January in the monthly Scribner's Magazine.
- April 3 – The English literary biographer Thomas Wright (of Olney) first publishes, in the Daily Express, some facts about Charles Dickens' relations with the actress Ellen Ternan.
- April 6 – Rudyard Kipling and W. B. Yeats are awarded the Gothenburg Prize for Poetry.
- May 1 – The first officially designated Thingplatz for the performance of Thingspiele is dedicated in the Brandberge in Halle (Nazi Germany).
- May 16–17 – In the Soviet Union, Joseph Stalin orders the NKVD to "preserve but isolate" Osip Mandelstam, after having been informed of the "Stalin Epigram"; Mandelstam is then arrested. A protest by literary figures, including Anna Akhmatova and Boris Pasternak, prompts Stalin to declare that he might "review the case" (he never will). His admiration for Pasternak as a poetic genius is strengthened when the latter asks for a private meeting to discuss "life and death" — although he never grants it, he instructs the NKVD to "leave that cloud-dweller [Pasternak] alone".
- June
  - A medieval manuscript of Le Morte d'Arthur used by Caxton is identified in the Fellows' Library of Winchester College (England) by the bibliophile Walter Fraser Oakeshott.
  - The English poet Laurie Lee walks out one midsummer morning from his Gloucestershire home, bound for Spain.
  - Two notable gentleman detectives of the Golden Age of Detective Fiction, set in England, appear for the first time in print, later to have whole series written about them. The first to feature Inspector Roderick Alleyn of Scotland Yard is A Man Lay Dead by Ngaio Marsh, at this time resident in her native New Zealand, published in London. The first Sir Henry Merrivale locked room mystery, The Plague Court Murders, appears from John Dickson Carr, at this time resident in the UK and writing as "Carter Dickson", in New York around early June. It is followed in December by The White Priory Murders.
- July 17 – The circular Manchester Central Library, England, opens.
- August – Boris Pasternak and Korney Chukovsky are among those at the first Congress of the Union of Soviet Writers.
- September – Henry Miller's novel Tropic of Cancer is published in Paris by the Obelisk Press. The United States Customs Service prohibits imports of it.
- September 4 – Evelyn Waugh's novel A Handful of Dust is first published in full.
- October 22 – A new Cambridge University Library, designed by Giles Gilbert Scott, opens in England.
- October 24 – The first of Rex Stout's Nero Wolfe detective novels, Fer-de-Lance, is published in New York, and abridged in the November The American Magazine as "Point of Death."
- November 20 – Lillian Hellman's first successful play, The Children's Hour, dealing with a theme of accusations of lesbianism, opens at the Maxine Elliott Theatre on Broadway in New York, where it will run for two years.
- December 25 – The Romanian novelist Panait Istrati, a former communist, begins his collaboration with the quasi-fascist Cruciada Românismului with a polemic against antisemitism. The weekly newspaper, edited by Mihai Stelescu and Alexandru Talex, later hosts pieces by Constantin Virgil Gheorghiu.
- Unknown date – The first three volumes of Mikhail Sholokhov's novel And Quiet Flows the Don first appear in English under this title.

== New books ==
=== Fiction ===
- M. Ageyev – Cocain Romance (Roman s kokainom)
- Edwin Balmer and Philip Wylie – After Worlds Collide
- Sharadindu Bandyopadhyay – Pother Kanta
- Samuel Beckett – More Pricks Than Kicks
- Phyllis Bottome – Private Worlds
- Marjorie Bowen – Moss Rose
- Ernest Bramah – The Bravo of London
- James Branch Cabell – Smirt
- John Brophy – Waterfront
- James M. Cain – The Postman Always Rings Twice
- Morley Callaghan – Such Is My Beloved
- Victor Canning – Mr. Finchley Discovers His England
- Willy Corsari – Terugkeer tot Thera (Return to Thera, introduces Inspector Lund, the archetypal Dutch detective)
- John Dickson Carr
  - The Blind Barber
  - The Eight of Swords
  - The Bowstring Murders (as Carr Dickson/Carter Dickson)
  - The Plague Court Murders (as Carter Dickson)
  - The White Priory Murders (as Carter Dickson)
  - Devil Kinsmere (as Roger Fairbairn)
- Gabriel Chevallier – Clochemerle
- Agatha Christie
  - Murder on the Orient Express (book publication, features Hercule Poirot)
  - Why Didn't They Ask Evans? (full book publication)
  - The Listerdale Mystery (short stories)
  - Parker Pyne Investigates (short stories)
  - Unfinished Portrait (as Mary Westmacott)
- G.D.H. Cole and Margaret Cole – Death in the Quarry
- Colette – Duo
- J.J. Connington – The Ha-Ha Case
- Freeman Wills Crofts
  - The 12.30 from Croydon
  - Mystery on Southampton Water
- Henry de Montherlant – Les Célibataires (The Bachelors)
- Isak Dinesen – Seven Gothic Tales
- Pierre Drieu La Rochelle – The Comedy of Charleroi (La Comédie de Charleroi, linked short stories)
- Max Ernst – Une semaine de bonté (A Week of Kindness, graphic novel)
- F. Scott Fitzgerald – Tender Is the Night
- Carlo Emilio Gadda – Il castello di Udine
- Jeanne Galzy – Jeunes Filles en serre chaude (Young girls in a greenhouse)
- Anthony Gilbert – An Old Lady Dies
- Jean Giono – The Song of the World
- Robert Graves – I, Claudius
- Graham Greene – It's a Battlefield
- Walter Greenwood – His Worship the Mayor
- Harold Heslop
  - The Crime of Peter Ropner
  - Goaf (English version)
- Robert Hichens – The Power To Kill
- James Hilton – Goodbye, Mr. Chips
- Richard Hull – The Murder of My Aunt
- Zora Neale Hurston – Jonah's Gourd Vine: A Novel
- F. Tennyson Jesse – A Pin to See the Peepshow
- D. Gwenallt Jones – Plasau'r Brenin
- John Knittel – Via Mala
- Ronald Knox – Still Dead
- Halldór Laxness – Independent People (Sjálfstætt fólk) — Part I, Icelandic Pioneers (Landnámsmaður Íslands)
- Alexander Lernet-Holenia – The Standard
- Eiluned Lewis – Dew on the Grass
- Eric Linklater – Magnus Merriman
- E. C. R. Lorac
  - Murder in Chelsea
  - Murder in St. John's Wood
- Marie Belloc Lowndes
  - Another Man's Wife
  - The Chianti Flask
- Compton Mackenzie – The Darkening Green
- Ngaio Marsh – A Man Lay Dead
- Alan Melville
  - Quick Curtain
  - Weekend at Thrackley
- Henry Miller – Tropic of Cancer
- Gladys Mitchell – Death at the Opera
- Leopold Myers – Rajah Amar
- Vladimir Nabokov – Despair
- Carolina Nabuco – A Sucessora
- John O'Hara – Appointment in Samarra
- E. Phillips Oppenheim
  - The Man Without Nerves
  - The Spy Paramount
  - The Strange Boarders of Palace Crescent
- George Orwell – Burmese Days
- John Cowper Powys
  - Autobiography
  - Weymouth Sands
- Ellery Queen – The Chinese Orange Mystery
- Henry Roth – Call It Sleep
- Rafael Sabatini – Venetian Masque
- Dorothy L. Sayers – The Nine Tailors
- Bruno Schulz – The Street of Crocodiles (short stories, Sklepy cynamonowe – Cinnamon Shops – in December 1933, dated 1934)
- Mihail Sebastian – De două mii de ani (For Two Thousand Years)
- J. Slauerhoff – Het leven op aarde (Life on Earth)
- Howard Spring – Shabby Tiger
- Irving Stone – Lust for Life
- Rex Stout – Fer-de-Lance
- Cecil Street
  - Poison for One
  - The Robthorne Mystery
  - Shot at Dawn
- Ruth Suckow – The Folks
- Phoebe Atwood Taylor
  - The Mystery of the Cape Cod Tavern
  - Sandbar Sinister
- 'Torquemada' – Cain's Jawbone
- Thomas F. Tweed – Blind Mouths
- S. S. Van Dine
  - The Casino Murder Case
  - The Dragon Murder Case
- Simon Vestdijk – Terug tot Ina Damman (Return to Ina Damman, first published of the Anton Wachter cycle)
- Henry Wade – Constable Guard Thyself
- Evelyn Waugh – A Handful of Dust
- Nathanael West – A Cool Million
- Dennis Wheatley – The Devil Rides Out
- Dorothy Whipple – They Knew Mr. Knight
- P. G. Wodehouse
  - Thank You, Jeeves
  - Right Ho, Jeeves
- S. Fowler Wright
  - David
  - Prelude in Prague: The War of 1938
  - Who Else But She? (as Sydney Fowler)
- V. M. Yeates – Winged Victory
- Francis Brett Young – This Little World
- Marguerite Yourcenar – A Coin in Nine Hands (Denier du rêve)
- Louis Aragon – The Bells of Basel (Les Cloches de Bâle)

=== Children and young people ===
- Edgar Rice Burroughs – Tarzan and the Lion Man
- Elena Fortún – Celia en el mundo (Celia in the World)
- Hergé – Cigars of the Pharaoh (Les Cigares du pharaon)
- Capt. W. E. Johns – Biggles of the Camel Squadron
- Lorna Lewis – The Little French Poodle
- Constantin S. Nicolăescu-Plopșor – Paramiseà romanè (anthology)
- Arthur Ransome – Coot Club
- Hilda van Stockum – A Day on Skates
- William Woodthorpe Tarn – The Treasure of the Isle of Mist
- P. L. Travers – Mary Poppins (first in Mary Poppins series of eight books)
- Geoffrey Trease – Bows Against the Barons

=== Drama ===
- Tawfiq al-Hakim – Shahrazad (Scheherazade)
- James Bridie – Mary Read
- Cao Yu – Thunderstorm (雷雨, Léiyǔ)
- Winifred Carter – The Queen Who Kept Her Head
- Max Catto – French Salad
- Jean Cocteau – The Infernal Machine
- Federico García Lorca – Yerma
- Ian Hay – Admirals All
- Lillian Hellman – The Children's Hour
- Frederick J. Jackson – The Bishop Misbehaves
- Pär Lagerkvist – Bödeln (The Hangman; dramatization)
- Eberhard Wolfgang Möller – Rothschild siegt bei Waterloo
- Ayn Rand – Night of January 16th (first performed as Woman on Trial)
- Lawrence Riley – Personal Appearance
- Dodie Smith – Touch Wood
- John Van Druten – Flowers of the Forest
- Paul Vulpius (Ladislas Fodor and Hans Adler) – Youth at the Helm

=== Poetry ===
- Vladimir Cavarnali – Poesii (Poems)
- Constantin S. Nicolăescu-Plopșor – Ghileà romanè (anthology)
- Dylan Thomas – 18 Poems

=== Non-fiction ===
- Ruth Benedict – Patterns of Culture
- Maud Bodkin – Archetypal Patterns of Poetry: Psychological Studies of Imagination
- Marjorie Bowen – The Scandal of Sophie Dawes
- Martí de Riquer i Morera
  - L'humanisme català (1388–1494)
  - Humanisme i decadència en les lletres catalanes
- Pierre Drieu La Rochelle – Socialisme fasciste (Fascist Socialism)
- Daphne du Maurier – Gerald: A Portrait
- Julius Evola – Il Mistero del Graal e la Tradizione Ghibellina dell'Impero (The Mystery of the Grail)
- Emma Goldman – Living My Life
- Aldous Huxley – Beyond the Mexique Bay
- Nicolae Iorga
  - Byzance après Byzance
  - Histoire de la vie byzantine
  - Orizonturile mele. O viață de om așa cum a fost
- Hugh Kingsmill – The Sentimental Journey: A Life of Charles Dickens
- Cornelia Meigs – Invincible Louisa: The Story of the Author of Little Women
- A. A. Milne – Peace with Honour
- Paul Otlet – Traité de Documentation
- Karl Popper – The Logic of Scientific Discovery
- J. B. Priestley – English Journey
- Amber Reeves – The Nationalisation of Banking
- Antal Szerb – A magyar irodalom története (History of Hungarian literature)
- H. G. Wells – An Experiment in Autobiography

== Births ==
- January 4 – Hellmuth Karasek, German journalist, literary critic and novelist (died 2015)
- January 8 – Alexandra Ripley, American novelist (died 2004)
- January 12
  - Ebrahim Nafae, Egyptian journalist (died 2018)
  - Alan Sharp, Scottish-American screenwriter and author (died 2013)
- January 18 – Raymond Briggs, English writer and illustrator (died 2022)
- February 10
  - Fleur Adcock, New Zealand-born poet (died 2024)
  - Gordon Lish, American writer, editor and teacher
- February 18 – Audre Lorde, American poet, writer and feminist (died 1992)
- February 27 – N. Scott Momaday, Native American novelist (died 2024)
- March 28 – Jean Louvet, Belgian dramatist (died 2015)
- April 11 – Mark Strand, American poet, essayist and translator (died 2014)
- April 24 – Jayakanthan, Tamil writer, Jnanpith awardee (died 2015)
- May 10 – Richard Peck, American novelist (died 2015)
- May 12 – Elechi Amadi, Nigerian novelist (died 2016)
- May 27 – Harlan Ellison, American science fiction writer (died 2018)
- June 11 – Lady Annabel Goldsmith, English memoirist and socialite
- July 11 – Helen Cresswell, English children's writer and scriptwriter (died 2005)
- July 13 – Wole Soyinka, Nigerian writer, playwright and Nobel laureate
- July 20 – Uwe Johnson, German writer (died 1984)
- July 21 – Jonathan Miller, English satirist and non-fiction author (died 2019)
- August 5 – Wendell Berry, American poet, novelist and activist (died 2026)
- August 6
  - Piers Anthony, English-born science fiction and fantasy writer
  - Diane di Prima, American poet of the Beat Generation and artist (died 2020)
- August 16 – Diana Wynne Jones, English children's fantasy novelist (died 2011)
- September 11 – Leon Rooke, Canadian novelist
- September 12 – Alan Isler, English-American novelist
- September 17 – Binoy Majumdar, Indian Hungryalist poet (died 2006)
- September 21 – Leonard Cohen, Canadian-born poet, singer-songwriter and novelist (died 2016)
- September 23 – Per Olov Enquist, Swedish novelist (died 2020)
- October 1 – Shakeb Jalali, Pakistani poet in Urdu (suicide 1966)
- October 17 – Alan Garner, English children's novelist
- October 24 – Adrian Mitchell, English poet, playwright and children's author (died 2008)
- November 9 – Ronald Harwood (Ronald Horwitz), South African-born English dramatist and screenwriter (died 2020)
- November 12 – John McGahern, Irish novelist (died 2006)
- November 15 – Irén Pavlics, Slovene author in Hungary
- November 19 – Joanne Kyger, American poet (died 2017)
- November 21 – Beryl Bainbridge, English novelist (died 2010)
- December 5 – Joan Didion, American writer (died 2021)
- December 7 – Audrey Maas, American novelist and television writer (died 1975)
- December 27 – Aidan Chambers, British author of children's and young adult novels (died 2025)
- December 28 – Alasdair Gray, Scottish novelist and artist (died 2019)
- unknown dates
  - Muhammad al-Maghut, Syrian Ismaili poet (died 2006)
  - Yaakov Shabtai, Israeli novelist, playwright and translator (died 1981)

== Deaths ==
- January 1 – Jakob Wassermann, German-Jewish novelist (born 1873)
- January 6 – Dorothy Edwards, Welsh novelist (suicide, born 1903)
- January 8 – Andrei Bely (Boris Nikolaevich Bugaev), Russian novelist, poet and critic (born 1880)
- January 11 – Helen Zimmern, German-born English writer and translator (born 1846)
- January 15 – Hermann Bahr, Austrian dramatist and critic (born 1863)
- February 8 – Ferenc Móra, Hungarian novelist and journalist (born 1879)
- February 28 – Emeline Harriet Howe, American poet, writer and social activist (born 1844)
- March 10 – Thomas Anstey Guthrie (F. Anstey), English comic novelist and journalist (born 1856)
- April 9 – Safvet-beg Bašagić, Bosnian poet (born 1870)
- April 12 – Robert Clyde Packer, Australian journalist and newspaper magnate (heart failure, born 1879)
- May 1 – Paul Zarifopol, Romanian critic (born 1874)
- June 14 – John Gray, English poet (born 1866)
- June 21 – Thorne Smith, American humorist and fantasy author (heart attack, born 1892)
- June 26 – Naito Torajiro (内藤 虎次郎), Japanese historian (born 1866)
- June 30 – Night of the Long Knives
  - Fritz Gerlich, German journalist (murdered, born 1883)
  - Karl-Günther Heimsoth, Austrian doctor and gay publicist (shot, born 1899)
  - Willi Schmid, German music critic (murdered, born 1893)
- July 4 – Hayim Nahman Bialik, Hebrew-language poet (born 1873)
- July 21 – Julian Hawthorne, American journalist and novelist (born 1846)
- July 23 – Karl Joel, German philosopher (born 1864)
- July 29 – Frane Bulić, Croatian historian (born 1846)
- August 13 – Mary Hunter Austin, American travel writer (born 1868)
- August 30 – Rebecca Richardson Joslin, American non-fiction writer (born 1846)
- September 9 – Roger Fry, English art critic (born 1866)
- September 21 – Gheorghe Bogdan-Duică, Romanian literary critic (born 1866)
- November 23 – Arthur Wing Pinero, English dramatist (born 1855)
- December 15 – Gustave Lanson, French historian and literary critic (born 1857)
- December 26 – Wallace Thurman, African American novelist (TB, born 1902)
- unknown dates

- Cora Linn Daniels, American author, editor, correspondent (born 1952)

== Awards ==
- James Tait Black Memorial Prize for fiction: Robert Graves, I, Claudius and Claudius the God
- James Tait Black Memorial Prize for biography: J. E. Neale, Queen Elizabeth
- King's Gold Medal for Poetry instituted this year with first winner, Laurence Whistler
- Newbery Medal for children's literature: Cornelia Meigs, Invincible Louisa
- Nobel Prize in Literature: Luigi Pirandello.
- Prix Goncourt: Roger Vercel, Capitaine Conan
- Pulitzer Prize for Drama: Sidney Kingsley, Men in White
- Pulitzer Prize for Poetry: Robert Hillyer, Collected Verse
- Pulitzer Prize for the Novel: Caroline Miller, Lamb in His Bosom
