= Heidelberg Thingstätte =

Open-air theatre in Heidelberg, Germany

Coordinates: 49°25′24″N 8°42′23″E

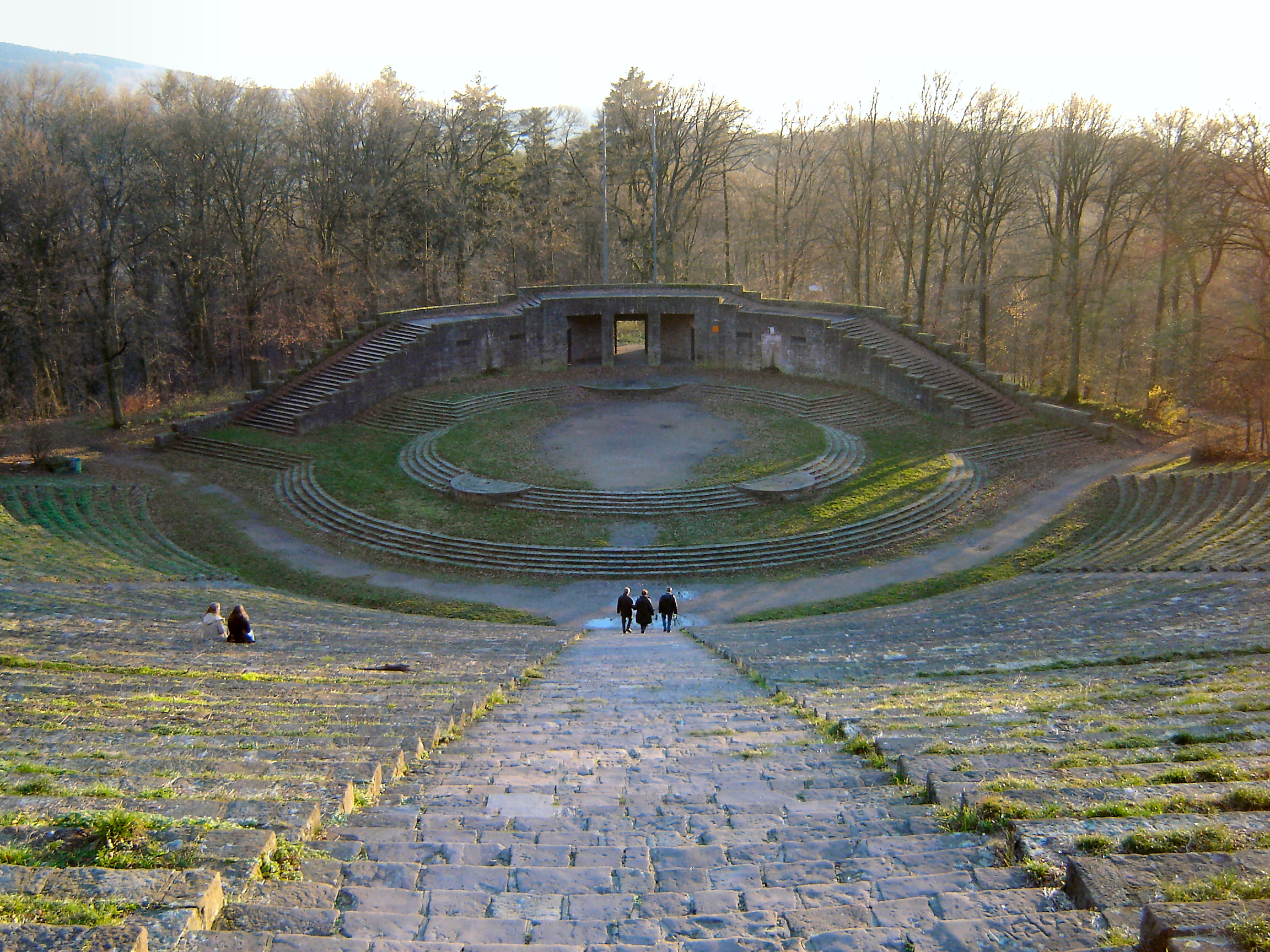
Heidelberg Thingstätte

The Heidelberg Thingstätte is an open-air theatre on the Heiligenberg in Heidelberg, Baden-Württemberg, Germany. It was built during the Third Reich for performances and events as part of the Thingspiel movement. Until 2018, it was primarily used for unofficial Walpurgis Night celebrations. It is a protected cultural monument.

== Third Reich ==
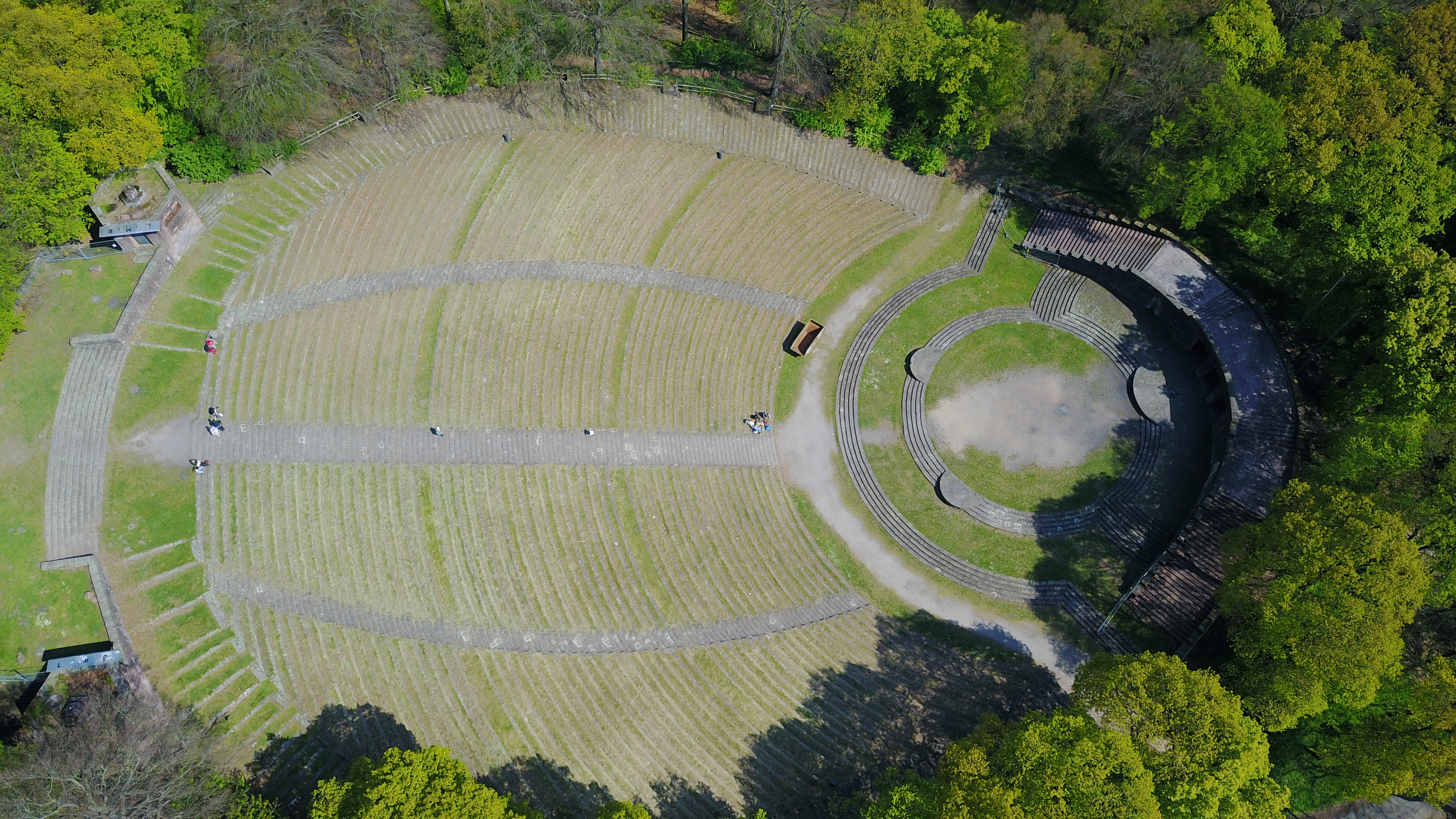
Bird's eye view of the Thingstätte

The Heiligenberg theatre is one of the official Thingstätten or Thingplätze built in the first part of the Nazi era as part of the Thingspiel movement. It is in the form of an egg-shaped amphitheatre and has a capacity of approximately 8,000 seats or 15,000 standees. The architect was Hermann Alker. The original design was to seat 10,300 people with room for an additional 20,000 standees and include a dance ring behind the stage; work began in late April 1934 and was to have been completed in July, but paused and resumed on the reduced plan, and the facility was completed in June 1935 and dedicated on the 22nd of that month. Approximately 20,000 people attended, and in his address to them Joseph Goebbels spoke of the 'holy mountain' that was the site and characterised the Thingstätten as "the Lagtagen [State diets or parliaments] of our time"; he described the theatre as "National Socialism in stone" and compared the construction of Thingstätten to that of the autobahns. The opening festivities concluded with a summer solstice celebration during which Franz Philipp's cantata Heiliges Vaterland was performed. Originally, the theatre was to have been the venue for the première of Richard Euringer's German Passion 1933 during the upcoming Reichsfestspiele, the Reich-sponsored adaptation of the Heidelberger Schlossfestspiele (lit. 'Heidelberg Castle Festival'). Since the theatre was not ready, the performance instead took place in the Heidelberg Castle's courtyard.

The total cost for building the theatre, including creating parking and access roads and the provision of water and electrical power, appears to have been approximately 600,000 RM, all but 40,000 RM borne by the city. The participation of Reich Labour Service workers was exaggerated for propaganda purposes; the majority of the work was done by professional builders. In Alker's original plan, there was no artificial amplification: the building at the back of the stage incorporating the actors' dressing rooms was to have formed a high visual barrier which also reflected the sound back at the audience. However, the early Thingstätten, notably that at the Brandberge outside Halle, proved not to have the good acoustics of the Greek amphitheatres. The theatre at Heidelberg was therefore built with 8 microphone lines fed by 17 on-stage microphones, and 7 loudspeakers at the edge of the stage and on the stage building, which was lower than originally planned and provided with stairs on either side so that it could serve as additional stage space; for example, the entire theatre could now be surrounded by a line of flag- or torch-bearers. Two towers at the rear of the theatre, at the top of the stands, housed the controls for the sound and for lighting, including a mixing board; the installation made it possible to play sound recordings and pipe in radio broadcasts to the stage as well as to amplify lead actors, who were more important to the Thingspiel dramas than had originally been envisaged by architects. The plans for the Thingstätten on the Lorelei rock and at Rostock were modified based on this theatre.

The Thingstätte was located in Heidelberg partly as a counterpart to a cemetery of honour for the fallen of the First World War that was created on another peak above the city. Together with the Reichsfestspiele, one of its purposes was to present a picture of Nazi culture to foreign visitors; however, by the time it opened the Thing movement had already begun to fall out of favour, and in summer 1936, the Mayor of Heidelberg announced its renaming from Thingstätte to Feierstätte (celebration site). It was used for the première of Kurt Heynicke's Der Weg ins Reich during the 1935 Reichsfestpiele, and for further dramatic productions and seasonal celebrations until the siting of a flak tower there precluded planned use for a theatrical training programme in 1942.

== Postwar ==
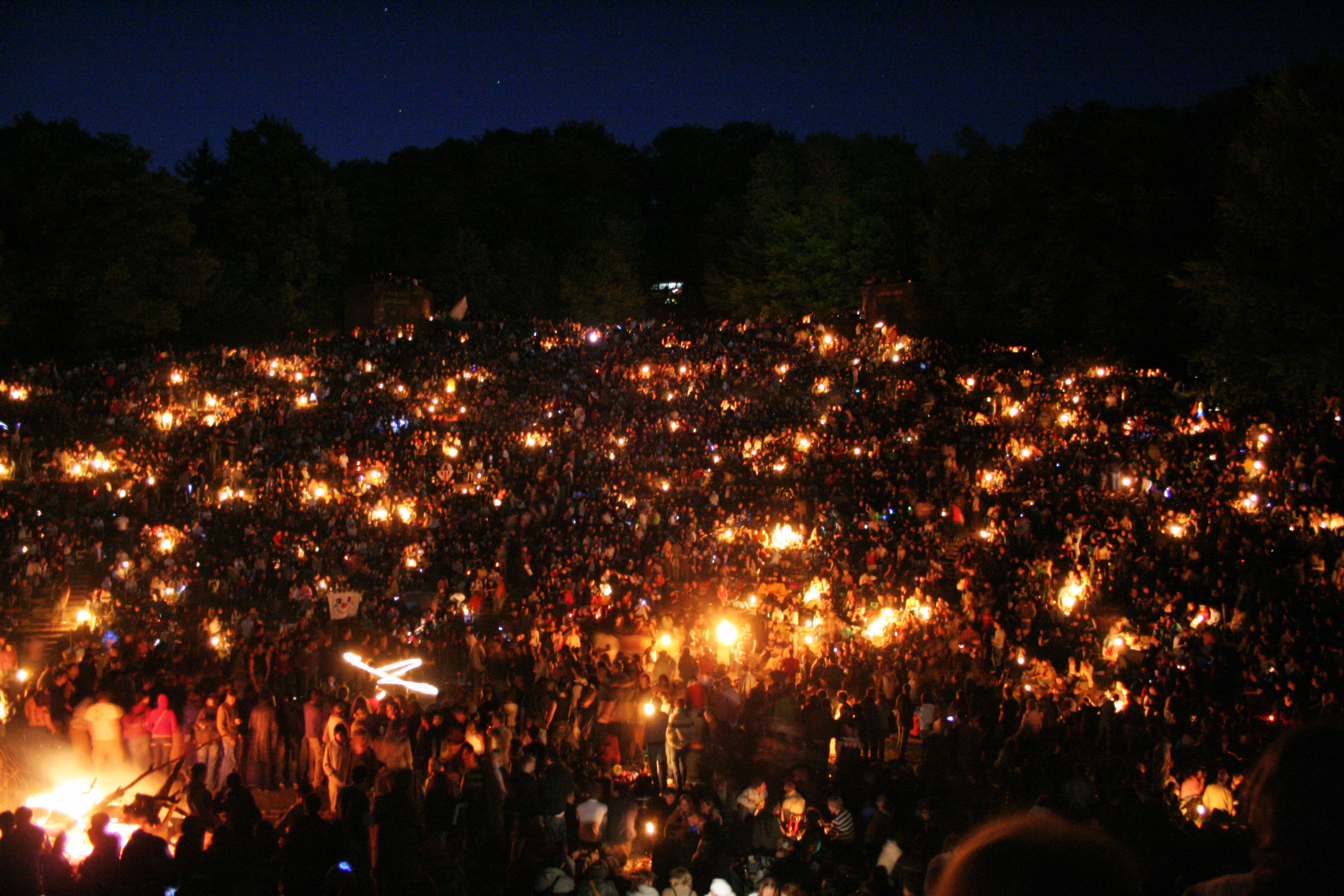
Walpurgis Night at the Heidelberg Thingstätte, 2007

After the war the American occupying forces held jazz concerts at the arena, and in 1947 used it for an Easter service which they invited Germans to attend. As early as 1946 a sports meeting was held there. In 1945 it was renamed Heiligenberg-Anlage (Heiligenberg facility), but usage gradually returned to the original name of Thingstätte. The site is now municipal property, has been declared a state protected monument, and like the rest of the mountain, is tended by the Schutzgemeinschaft Heiligenberg.

Plans to resume use of the theatre for performances have been hindered by the lack of electricity and other services. However, from the late 1980s until 2017 it was unofficially used for annual celebrations of Walpurgis Night, which featured fire-dancers and jugglers and attracted as many as 15,000 people. In 2014 David Borymski published a half-hour documentary on the event called Fackelkinder (torch children). In 2017 a forest fire broke out in the area of the upper Philosophenweg during the celebration and, in an unrelated event, a 25-year-old man was severely injured on his way down from the Heiligenberg; after an investigation, the City of Heidelberg banned the celebration at the location in following years. The Thingstätte was fenced off and police were stationed on the Heiligenberg for the night of 30 April–1 May.

In 2014 the city introduced Sunday and holiday bus service to the theatre, and there are plans to fell approximately one third of the trees on the mountain beginning in 2016; some of these have obscured the view of the city from the theatre.

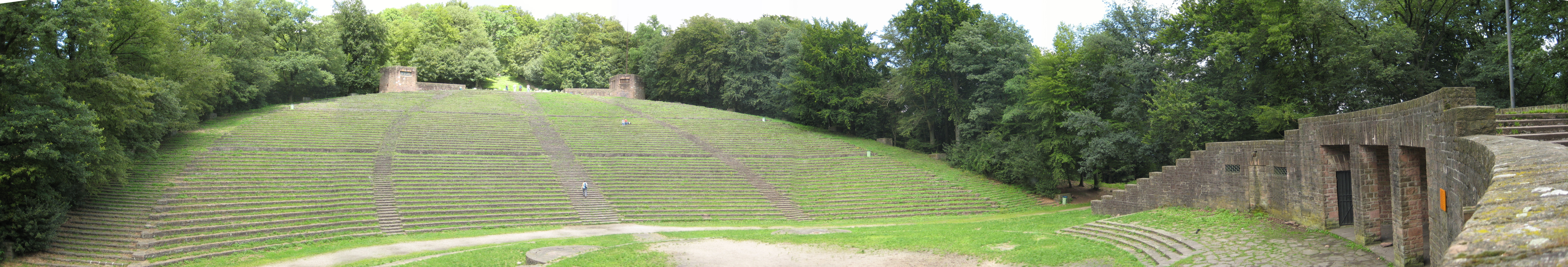
Panoramic view from stage end
