= Lorna Lewis =

Lorna Lewis is the name of:

- Lorna Lewis (writer) (died 1962), British writer
- Lorna Lewis (actress) (died 2013), American actress
