= Rockelmann =

Coordinates: 50°32′N 12°47′E

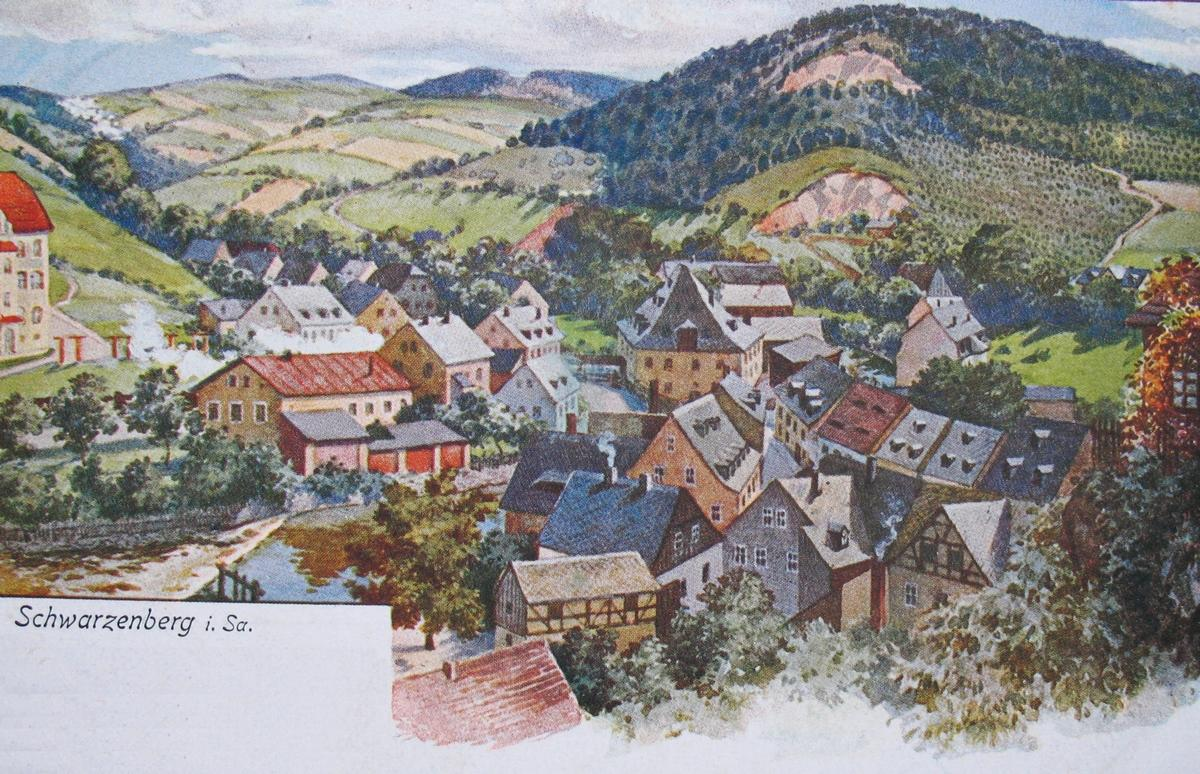
- Early 20th-century view of Rockelmann above Schwarzenberg

Highest point
- Elevation: 577.2 m (1,894 ft)

Geography
- Location: Saxony, Germany
- Parent range: Ore Mountains

The Rockelmann is a mountain in the Ore Mountains in Saxony, southeastern Germany. It is south-southwest of Schwarzenberg. It formerly had two granite quarries, one of which was converted into an open-air theatre in the 1920s, the other into a Nazi arena (Thingplatz) in the 1930s, and is also the site of a memorial to soldiers killed in World War I; all three are within Rockelmann Park, which was laid out in the 1930s.

== Mountain ==
The first extant mention of the Rockelmann is in a church document dated 1552. The origin of the name is unknown. The mountain is a source of granite as well as of augen gneiss, and rock was quarried for centuries at two points on the mountain above the town; granite from the Rockelmann was used to build the castle, to build St. George's Church (St.-Georgen-Kirche) in the 1690s and to rebuild the town after a disastrous fire in 1709. A section of the town is named after the mountain.

In 1908 there were efforts to build a lookout tower on the mountain. The dialect poet Curt Rambach composed a poem entitled "Wos iech erlabt hoo off'n Rokelmaa!" (What I experienced on the Rockelmann) which was printed on postcards in aid of the campaign.

== Open-air theatre ==
In the 1920s the lower quarry on the mountain was converted into an open-air theatre, which opened on 9 July 1924. It originally seated 700 and had a moveable stage in front of a rock wall with risers and steps. After renovations, it has a capacity of about 800 and is used for visiting theatrical performances by a troupe from Annaberg-Buchholz and for club events.

== Soldiers' Memorial ==
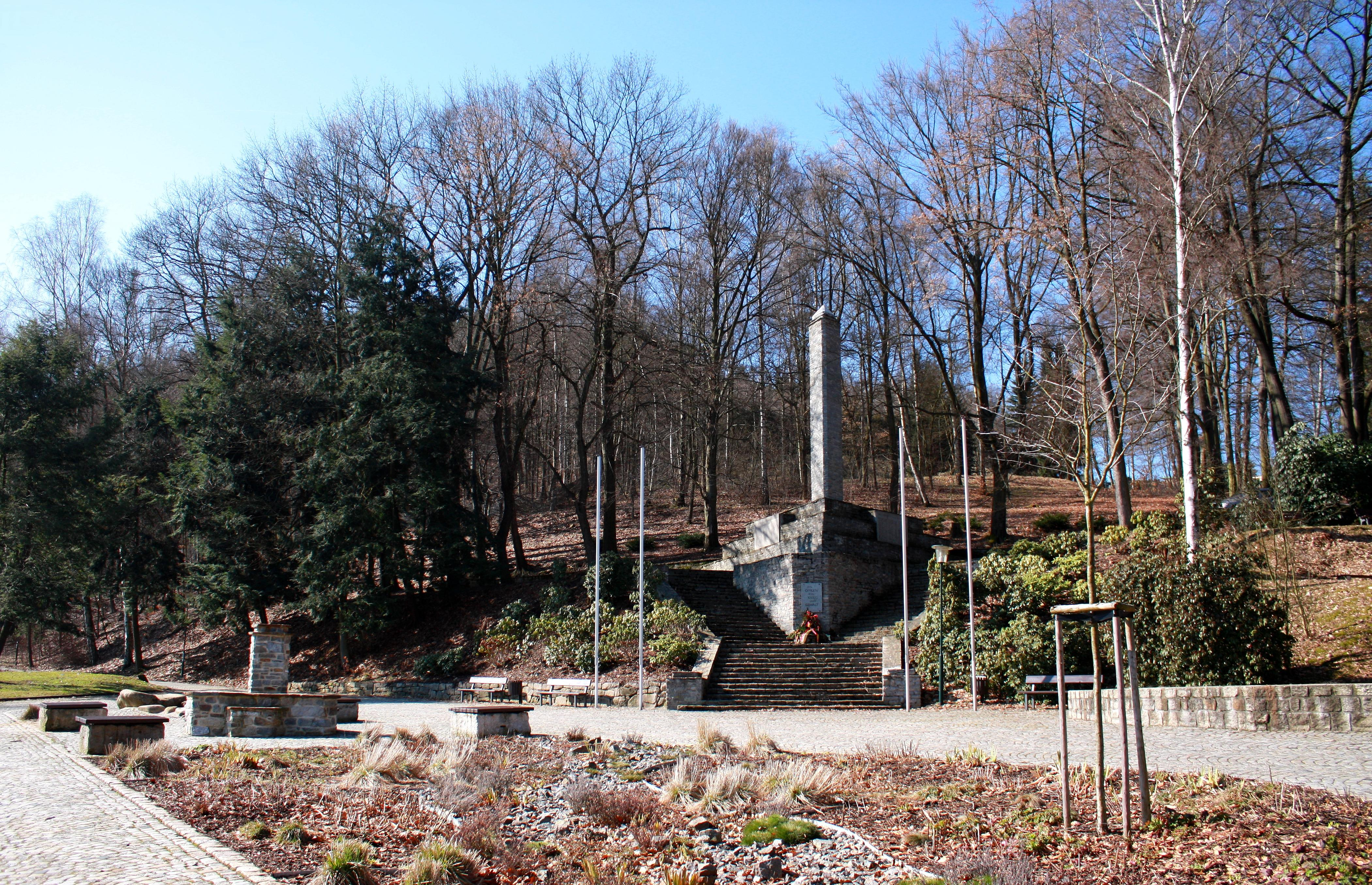
Soldiers' Memorial

On 10 October 1926, the Soldiers' Memorial (Kriegerehrenmal), a memorial to the men of Schwarzenberg fallen in the First World War, was dedicated by the members of the König Albert (King Albert) military association on the meadow previously known as the Jahnwiese. It consists of a masonry pillar 8 metres (26 ft) high, originally topped by the figure of a warrior swearing an oath. The statue, the work of Ziegler of Chemnitz, was melted down in the Second World War. In 2008, during renovations of the column made necessary by leaching salts, a welded capsule was discovered under the top; it contained contemporary banknotes, a newspaper, a programme from the dedication ceremony and a report on the construction of the monument written by the sculptor's grandfather, Hans Brockhage, also a sculptor.

== Nazi arena ==
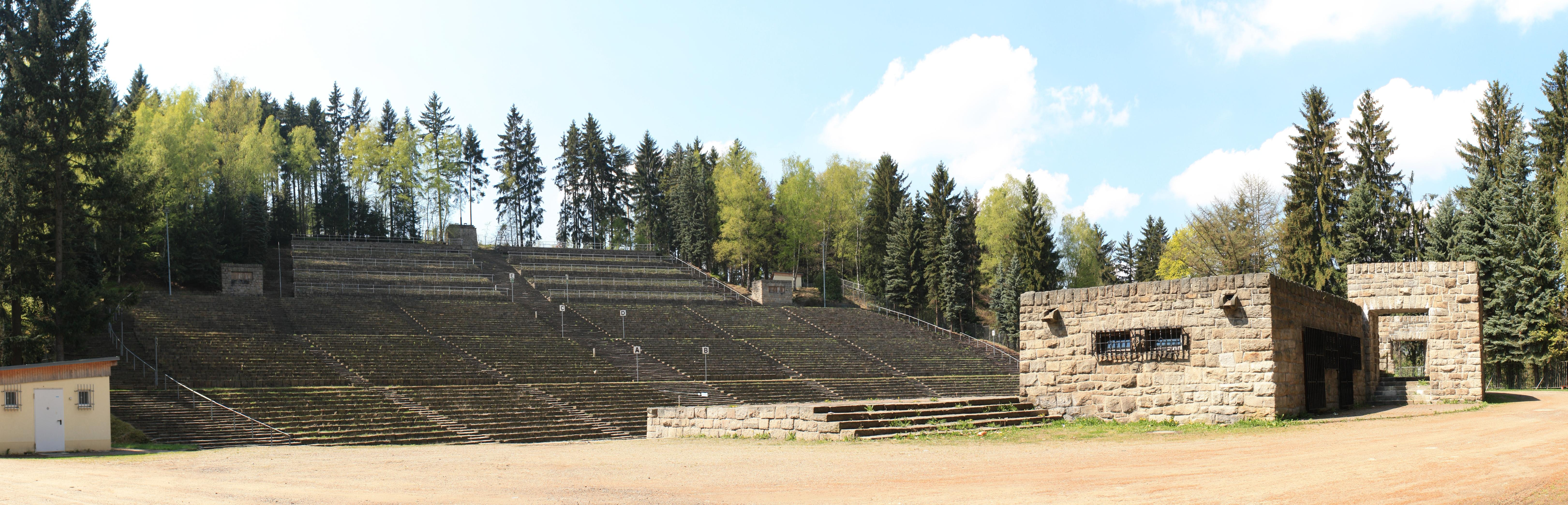
Waldbühne Schwarzenberg, the former Nazi arena

In the early 1930s, the idea arose of converting the upper quarry into an arena for large-scale events. This was done in the context of the Nazi Thing movement, and a large part of the dynamiting, transport and construction work was done by the Workers' Labour Service. A total of 1,300 workers were involved in the project, and according to contemporary accounts, professionals were responsible for 20,000 days of work, Labour Service workers for 60,000. The sod-breaking took place on 7 April 1934, but costs greatly exceeded the estimates, and the project was only completed after the Propaganda Ministry and the State of Saxony provided additional funds. The arena was inaugurated on 25–26 June 1938 as a Feierstätte der Volksgemeinschaft (ceremonial site for the folk community), the Grenzlandfeierstätte (Borderlands Ceremonial Site). A copper container containing construction plans, a newspaper and coins was sealed into the masonry to the right of the stage. The theatre was operated in cooperation with those at Borna and Kamenz; in 1938–39, the theatre troupe from the open-air theatre at Ehrenfriedersdorf also played there.

Under the German Democratic Republic, the arena was renamed in 1950 for President Wilhelm Pieck, who was himself present. In 1993 the town council renamed it the Waldbühne (forest stage or woodland theatre), and since German reunification it has been used for concerts, notably "oldies nights" presented by a private radio station. Since 1997 it has been leased to Peter Schwenkow's operating company, then called Concert Concept, now DEAG Deutsche Entertainment, who have also shown films there. Betriebsgesellschaft Waldbühne Schwarzenberg was co-founded by them together with Semmel Concerts Bayreuth, who provide additional events, and renovations have included creating a backstage area at the open-air theatre to serve the arena and constructing an electrical substation.

The arena was designed by Ludwig Moshamer, a Berlin architect. It is 102 metres (335 ft) wide at its widest point (to reduce the amount of blasting required, the upper tier of seats was not extended to match the lower), and 30 metres (98 ft) (175 steps) deep. According to a contemporary construction periodical, there were originally 6,500 seats and standing room for 5,600. The current capacity is 15,000, the largest open-air theatre in Saxony and the second largest in Germany; under the GDR it was given as 20,000. In 2010, the town further reduced the number of tickets to a maximum of 12,500 as a safety measure. The entrance is at the stage end of the arena; originally the technical equipment was housed under the stage together with an open space presumably intended for permanent displays, as at Halle. Emergency exits at the sides have been added, as well as emergency lighting.

== Park ==
The entire area surrounding both open-air theatres and the memorial was landscaped as Rockelmann Park, also in 1934–38. A set of bells of Meissen porcelain were previously housed in a tower there, but are now at the old well in the Old Town.
