= A Graveyard to Let =

1949 novel by John Dickson Carr

A Graveyard To Let
- First edition (US)
- Author: John Dickson Carr writing as "Carter Dickson"
- Language: English
- Series: Henry Merrivale
- Genre: Mystery fiction, Detective fiction
- Publisher: Morrow (US, 1949, first edition); Heinemann (UK, 1950)
- Publication date: 1949
- Publication place: United Kingdom
- Media type: Print (hardback & paperback)
- Pages: 247 (first US edition)
- Preceded by: The Skeleton in the Clock
- Followed by: Night at the Mocking Widow

A Graveyard To Let is a 1949 mystery novel by the American writer John Dickson Carr, who published it under the name of Carter Dickson. It is a locked room mystery (or, more properly, a subset of that category known as the "impossible mystery") featuring the series detective Sir Henry Merrivale.

== Plot summary ==
Sir Henry Merrivale, detective and explainer of the impossible, is visiting the United States.

He has been invited to visit millionaire Frederick Manning, to "witness a miracle" at his country home. Manning's three children are nervous about a secret which their father has threatened to reveal very soon—although it is probably not his relationship with a lady named Irene Stanley, whom Manning freely admits he is "keeping".

The morning after Sir Henry's arrival, and just as the house party hears police sirens drawing closer to the Manning home, Frederick Manning dives into the swimming pool, fully clothed, and vanishes. His clothes and hat float to the surface, but he is nowhere to be found.

Sir Henry must untangle Manning's personal and business dealings and follow the trail of clues to find Manning and reveal a criminal.
