= Rainer Schlösser =

German journalist and writer

Rainer Schlösser (sometimes anglicized as Schlosser or Schloesser; 28 July 1899 – 9 August 1945) was a German journalist and writer who held (1933–1945) the governmental post of Reichsdramaturg (Reich Drama Adviser) in the Ministry of Popular Enlightenment and Propaganda headed by Joseph Goebbels and also (from 1935 to 1938) President of the Reichstheaterkammer or Reich Theatre Chamber, the state governing body for drama. This was an even more important and high-profile position. The equivalent body in the world of music, the Reichsmusikkammer, was headed by the world-famous composer Richard Strauss from 1933 to 1935.

According to Dr. Gerwin Strobl, an academic specialist on the Third Reich and its cultural extensions, in his book The Swastika and the Stage: German Theatre and Society, 1933–1945:

"Future leading figures of Nazi theatre, such as Reichsdramaturg Rainer Schlösser, or Leader of the Hitler Youth and head of the Vienna theatre, Baldur von Schirach, are characteristic of the able, refined and literate group of men attracted by the promises of the Nazis of restoring German culture."

== Early life ==
Rainer Schlösser was born on 28 July 1899 at Jena in Thuringia. His father (d.1920) was a professor at the University of Jena who, in 1917, became the director of the Goethe-Schiller Archives at Weimar, a cultural centre of immense importance and now recognized as such by UNESCO. (Rudolf Steiner, inter alia, worked in the Goethe archive at one time).

== Career ==
Schlösser began officer cadet training in 1917, during the First World War, after having graduated from secondary education by having taken the Abitur (secondary school graduation certificate examination). Posted to Flanders, he saw combat and was promoted to the rank of full Lieutenant.

After the end of the war, Schlösser studied at both Jena and the University of Freiburg, reading History, Philosophy, German Philology and Evangelical [i.e. Protestant] Theology. Forced to interrupt his studies during the economic collapse of the early 1920s and making a living as a bank clerk, he returned to study in 1927 at Jena, receiving the degree of Doctor of Literature in 1931.

Schlösser took an active part in "volkisch" [nationalist-folk-oriented] politics from 1924. but his NSDAP membership number was only 772,091, indicating that his actual Party membership dated from much later. He was not one of the real "alte Kämpfer" ("old fighters") whose membership, at latest, could not be positioned after number 100,000, though it seems that he joined the Party prior to its election and takeover of government in 1932–1933.

In October 1931 (more than a year before the NSDAP and Hitler achieved state power in Germany), Schlösser became Culture-Political Editor of the Volkischer Beobachter (Folkish Observer), the party newspaper of the NSDAP.

== Reichsdramaturg ==
The position of Dramaturg in the German Reich of the 1930s and 1940s was one which "combined the offices of censor and animator. In neither was [Rainer Schlösser] altogether successful. Critical plays were of course banned, as were plays by Jewish authors and music by Jewish composers. But the manner of performance was less easy to control and left room for political innuendo and a modicum of independence."

Schlösser, like Hitler (and Stalin), favoured the works of Shakespeare and mused, in 1933, that Shakespeare was not just "Aryan" but more German than English.

The Reich Dramaturgical Bureau produced a "List of Undesirable and Abusive Literature for the Stage", which included the works of Bertolt Brecht.

Schlösser frequently stressed the usefulness to the Reich of the works of George Bernard Shaw. In that he followed the instruction given to Goebbels by Hitler himself (who enjoyed Caesar and Cleopatra), that Shaw's works should be "protected".

== Role in the Thingspiele Movement ==
The "Thingspiel" (pl. Thingspiele) has been described as "multi-disciplinary outdoor theatre". About 40 outdoor theatres, usually modelled on those of ancient Greece, were developed during the currency of the Third Reich, all between 1934 and 1937, though a further 360 planned were never built.

The first Thingplatz was dedicated in Halle in 1934, though the best known is the Dietrich-Eckart-Buhne in suburban Berlin, opened in 1936 for the (nearby) Berlin 1936 Summer Olympics and named after the dramatist and writer, Dietrich Eckart, an early comrade of Adolf Hitler. The Dietrich-Eckart-Buhne, which can seat 22,000 spectators, was renamed the Waldbuhne (Forest Theatre or Forest Stage) after 1948 and is still much-used.

The minister responsible, Joseph Goebbels, had in mind a concatenation of national, folk and traditional festivals:

The festivals, too, which this government celebrates with the people, have a deeper meaning. These are not festivals organized by the government at the expense of the people. Quite the contrary, they are festivals in which the government no longer stand in opposition to each other but that government and people have become one.

Schlösser was a proponent of the Thingspiele and, as Reichsdramaturg, much involved with the idea and its realization, which he described, in a 1934 speech, as "a longing for a drama that intensifies historical events to create a mythical, universal, unambiguous reality beyond reality". He added that "..only someone who understands this longing will be able to create the cultic popular drama of the future." Any subject might be suitable for a Thingspiel, so long as "placed in the context of the Nordic concept" and "moved into the light of our genuine and just myth of blood and honour."

Schlösser wrote that the Thingplatzen would become "the heart of the whole festive national political and artistic life of the individual cities" [Rainer Schlösser, Politik und Drama, pub. 1935].

The effect on an audience of a Thingspiel has been analyzed thus: "It was mainly the working of light and music, combined with the underlying ritual pattern, that triggered quasi-religious feelings and established an emotional bond among all those present."

It may be that one inspiration was the "sacred art" noted by Richard Wagner in the formulation of his world-famous music-dramas.

The basis of Schlosser's view of art and of the Third Reich itself is encapsulated in his words about von Weber's opera, Der Freischütz [The Random Shot, lit. The Free Shot] in the 1937 edition of the German Music Yearbook:

The cultural-political goal of the Third Reich is not to focus upon bureaucratic power, but to create fervor in the service of Holy Art. Der Freischütz is a mirror of the soul.

Schlösser's formulation of the Thingspiel structure was "an oratorio or programme of recitative choruses..a presentation of allegorical tableaux vivants followed by a presentation of colours and pledges of allegiance..a pageant parade..a ballet, expressionistic dances."

== Last years, death and legacy ==
In September 1939, with the coming of war against Poland, France and Great Britain, Schlösser was also appointed chief of the Cultural Office of the Hitler Youth, a uniformed position carrying the rank of Regional Leader [Obergebietsfuhrer]. From 1944, Schlösser directed a programme at the Ministry of Propaganda in respect of culture in the context of "total war" (a phrase conceived by Goebbels).

In 1945, Schlösser took an active part in the Battle for Berlin, fighting with the remnants of an SS-Panzer unit. Taken prisoner by Soviet forces, he was sentenced to death on 30 June 1945 and executed on 9 August 1945.

In 1946, the printed works of Schlösser were placed on a list of prohibited literature in the Soviet Occupation Zone of Germany. In 1953, the DDR (Deutsche Demokratische Republik, also known as East Germany) formalized and continued the ban.

The fact that Schlösser's name is still being cited in books and academic articles would seem to indicate that his work was and is not without importance in the history of drama. The "sound and light" shows of the post-1945 era may not owe their existence entirely to the Thingspiele of the 1930s, but those German performances may have been the genesis for part of that current, which would also include the rock music extravaganzas of recent decades (such as those of Rick Wakeman).

In 2012, a biography of Schlösser, Rainer Schlosser (1899–1945): der Reichsdramaturg, originally a doctoral dissertation, was published in Germany.
