= Behind the Crimson Blind =

1952 novel by John Dickson Carr

- First edition (US)
- Author: John Dickson Carr writing as "Carter Dickson"
- Language: English
- Series: Henry Merrivale
- Genre: Mystery, Detective
- Publisher: Morrow (US, 1952); Heinemann (UK, 1952)
- Publication date: 1952
- Publication place: United Kingdom
- Media type: Print (hardback & paperback)
- Pages: 249 (1st US)
- Preceded by: Night at the Mocking Widow
- Followed by: The Cavalier's Cup

Behind the Crimson Blind is a 1952 mystery novel by the American writer John Dickson Carr (1906–1977), who published it under the name of Carter Dickson. It is a whodunnit, featuring the series detective Sir Henry Merrivale.

== Plot summary ==
Sir Henry Merrivale is on vacation in Tangier, but cannot resist the opportunity to meet the challenge of a world-class criminal known as "Iron Chest", who always carried an ornate iron chest during his thefts. No one knows what Iron Chest really looks like, or how he manages to vanish without a trace after his thefts.

After a red-carpet welcome from the local constabulary, Sir Henry becomes friendly with two young English couples resident in Tangier and works closely with them to solve the mystery of Iron Chest's identity.
