= Night at the Mocking Widow =

1950 novel by John Dickson Carr

- First edition
- Author: John Dickson Carr writing as "Carter Dickson"
- Language: English
- Series: Henry Merrivale
- Genre: Mystery, detective
- Publisher: Morrow (US, 1950, first edition); Heinemann (UK, 1951)
- Publication date: 1950
- Publication place: United Kingdom
- Media type: Print (hardback & paperback)
- Pages: 256 (in Dell #650, 1953)
- Preceded by: A Graveyard To Let
- Followed by: Behind the Crimson Blind

Night at the Mocking Widow is a mystery novel by the American writer John Dickson Carr, who published it under the pen name of Carter Dickson. It is set in 1938. It is a whodunnit featuring the series detective Sir Henry Merrivale.

== Plot summary ==
The English village of Stoke Druid in Somerset has been plagued by a series of vicious anonymous letters written by a poison-pen who becomes known as the "Mocking Widow", after a forty-foot high rocky feature on the outskirts of the village.

A middle-aged spinster who has been tormented by the letters' suggestions of sexual immorality commits suicide. Sir Henry Merrivale is offered an incredibly rare volume of memoirs by the village bookseller if he exposes the poison-pen, and accepts. During the investigation, a young woman is frightened nearly to death by the Widow's threats to visit her in her bedroom—she sees the Widow in her bedroom at the time and place previously announced, in circumstances that seem impossible for anyone to have been there.

Then a village blackmailer who may have been the Widow's assistant is murdered, and Sir Henry brings the series of crimes home to their perpetrator.
