= The White Priory Murders =

1934 novel by John Dickson Carr

- First US edition dustjacket
- Author: John Dickson Carr writing as Carter Dickson
- Language: English
- Series: Henry Merrivale
- Genre: Mystery
- Publisher: Morrow (US, 1934); Heinemann (UK, 1935)
- Publication date: 1934
- Publication place: United Kingdom
- Media type: Print (hardback & paperback)
- Pages: 305 (first US hardback ed)
- ISBN: 0-553-20572-2 (Bantam paperback edition, 1982)
- OCLC: 8256696
- Preceded by: The Plague Court Murders
- Followed by: The Red Widow Murders

The White Priory Murders is a mystery novel by the American writer John Dickson Carr (1906–1977), who published it under the pen name of Carter Dickson. It is a locked room mystery and features his series detective, Sir Henry Merrivale, assisted by Scotland Yard Inspector Humphrey Masters.

== Plot summary ==
Marcia Tait is a Hollywood star who has come to England to take the lead in a new play. She is found beaten to death in the Queen's Mirror pavilion, the 17th-century trysting place of King Charles II and his mistresses. The problem is particularly puzzling because the pavilion is surrounded by newfallen snow, with only one set of footprints leading to it and none leading away. The suspects include a man who thought he was marrying her — and her husband, whose marriage was unknown to all.

Sir Henry Merrivale lends a hand to Inspector Masters in the investigation, but is too late to stop the second murder before Merrivale solves the case.

== Literary significance and criticism ==
"Sir Henry Merrivale is caught up in the murder of a wilful actress; it's done inside a pavilion, snow is on the ground, and there are crowds of candidates for her favors and for the role of murderer. ... The telling is done in Carter Dickson's usual long and diffuse talk which he thinks conversation; oddities are added for pseudo suspense; people shout, whirl, say What! in italics, and generally the thing is irritation unrelieved even by a second murder."

== Publication history ==
- December 1934, USA, William Morrow, hardback, 305pp (first US edition)
- 1935, UK, Heinemann, hardback, 282pp (first UK edition)
- 1942, USA, Pocket Books 156, paperback, (first US pb edition)
- 1946, USA, serialized in Crime Digest, June
- 1951, UK, Penguin Books 811, paperback, 251pp (first UK pb edition)
- 1982, USA, Bantam 20572-2, paperback, 214pp
- 1991, USA, International Polygonic ISBN 1-55882-072-8, paperback, 191pp (Library of Crime Classics)
- 2022, UK, British Library, paperback, 272pp (British Library Crime Classics)
