= Thingspiele =

Multi-disciplinary outdoor theatre performance

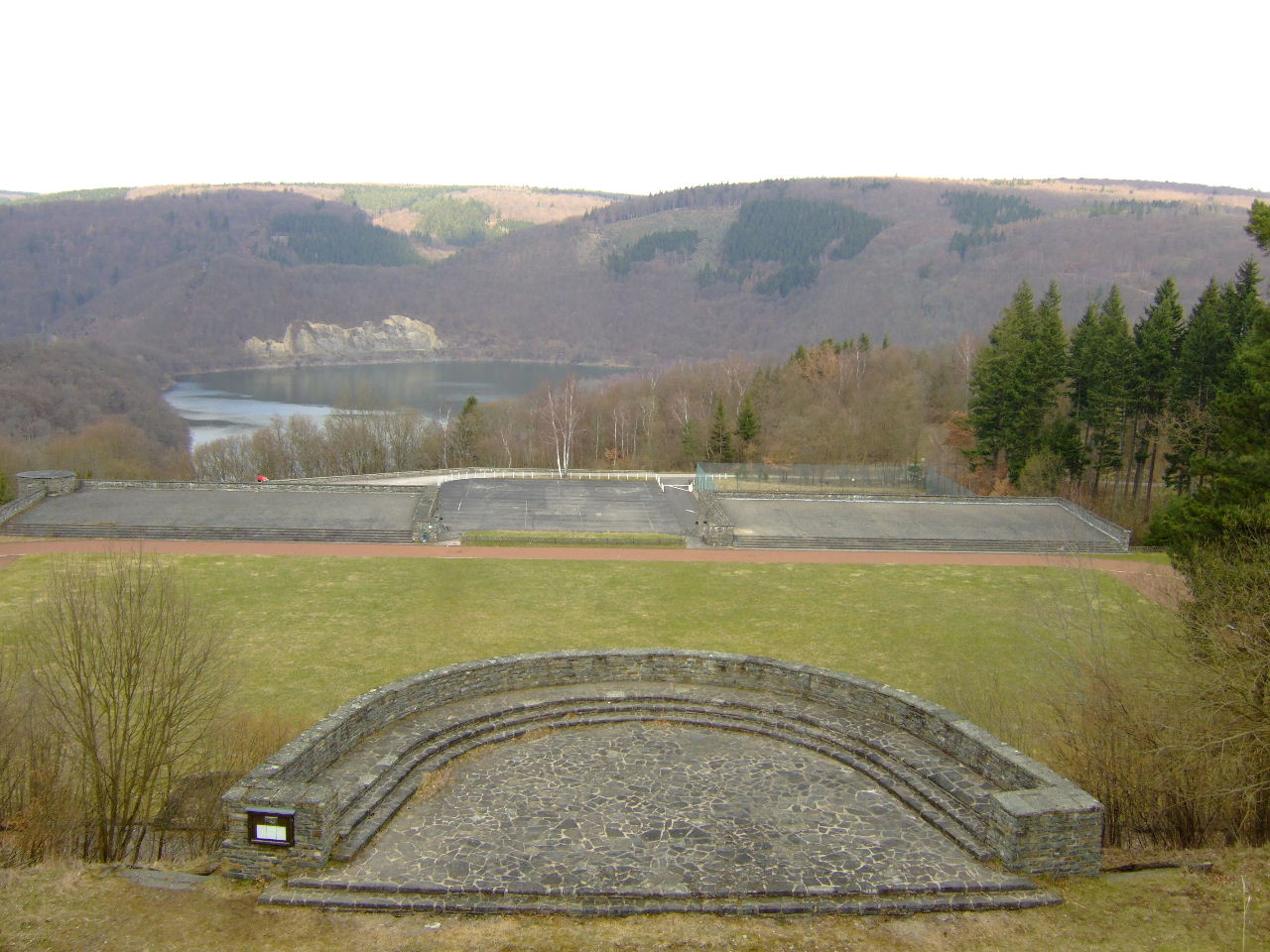
Thingplatz at Ordensburg Vogelsang

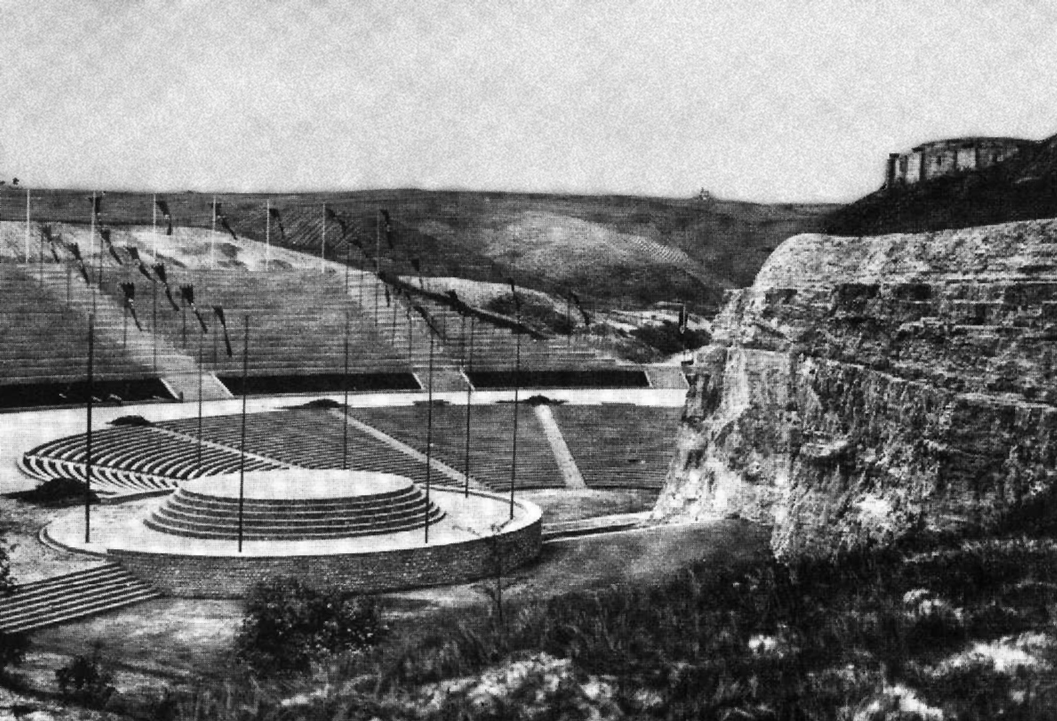
Feierstätte der Schlesier at the Annaberg in Silesia in a Nazi-era photograph

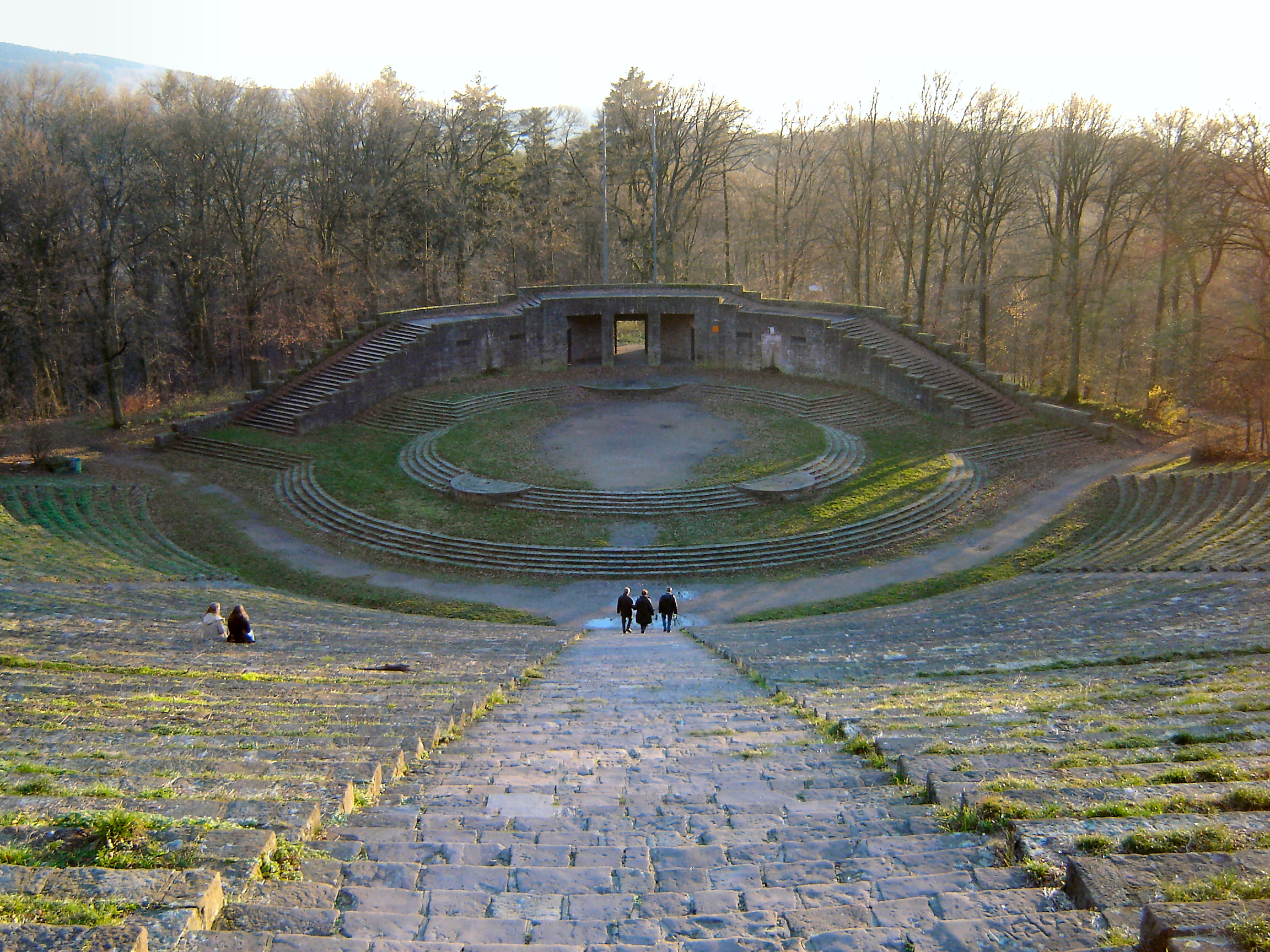
Heidelberg Thingstätte

A Thingspiel (plural Thingspiele) was a kind of multi-disciplinary outdoor theatre performance which enjoyed brief popularity in pre-war Nazi Germany during the 1930s. A Thingplatz or Thingstätte was a specially-constructed outdoor amphitheatre built for such performances. About 400 were planned, but only about 40 were built between 1933 and 1939.

== History ==
The idea of the Thingspiel movement was that the Volk would gather for völkisch meetings and for theatre and propaganda presentations. A Thing was an ancient judicial as well as social gathering of Germanic peoples, in an outdoor setting. The Thing sites were to be built as much as possible in a natural setting, incorporating rocks, trees, bodies of water, ruins, and hills of some historical or mythic significance. The term Thingspiel was first put forward by the academic Carl Niessen in a speech on 29 July 1933; he had Tacitus' Germania in mind. The Thingspiele were to be immersive multi-disciplinary theatre of a new type. As set out in a 1934 speech by Reich drama advisor Rainer Schlösser, the objective was "a drama that intensifies historical events to create a mythical, universal, unambiguous reality beyond reality." The performances were to be choric, to involve the audience as a realisation of the Volkgemeinschaft, and in this respect had antecedents in socialist Laienspiele and other movements seeking to open up theatre, including both Protestant and Catholic amateur traditions as well as Ernst Wachler's neo-pagan drama of the early 20th century. The dramas characteristically interwove audience and action, especially through the choruses, and sought to have the audience identify with the National Socialist revolution depicted. Thingspiele were as much ritual as drama, and the theatres were often referred to as "cult places". They were also intended from the start to be used to celebrate the cycle of Nazi national holidays.

Architecturally, the official Thingplätze were round and emulated Greek amphitheatres; they tended to be very large, to accommodate mass audiences and multimedia performances involving "entire battalions" of SA or Hitler Youth. A speaking chorus of 500–1,000 people was supposed to be available at each site; the largest planned Thingplatz, at Gelsenkirchen, was to have accommodated 200,000 people. The resulting size of both the stage and the audience area, and the need to have multiple stage levels for visibility, caused acoustic problems, and the theatres were soon equipped with amplification systems as well as lighting; turrets and platforms vaguely reminiscent of medieval forts concealed the controls for the equipment, and fire-pits for solstice festivals, originally planned to be in the middle of the stage area, were relegated to the periphery because of the risk to the cables. In many cases an adjacent area was provided for mass assemblies, with the theatre stage then becoming the speakers' podium.

The Thingspiel movement existed before the start of Nazi rule; the Reich Union for the Promotion of Open-Air Theatre, registered in December 1932, had Wilhelm Karl Gerst of the Catholic Theatre Union as its business manager, and Ödön von Horváth, Ernst Toller and Carl Zuckmayer were initially associated with the movement; however, it was endorsed by the Nazi régime with the foundation of the Reichsbund der deutschen Freilicht und Volksschauspiele (Reich League for German Open Air and Volk Plays) under the auspices of the Propaganda Ministry in 1933, and the first officially designated Thingplatz was dedicated on 1 May 1934 in the Brandberge in Halle. 400 Thing sites were planned, but only approximately 40 were built.

However, Hitler himself was not a big believer in the revival of ancient Germanic practices, and outdoor theatre could not sustain its appeal in the commonly cold and damp German weather. It proved impossible to build so many new theatres quickly, audience enthusiasm waned for the action-poor Thingspiele, and playwrights also failed to write enough of them. Beginning in 1935, many existing and all new Thing sites were renamed to Feierstätten (festival sites) or Freilichtbühnen (open-air theatres) and they were used for performances of conventional plays and folk festivals such as those celebrating the summer solstice. Otto Laubinger, who had promoted the Thingspiel movement as head of the theatre division of the Reichskulturkammer, died in 1935, and by 1937, when Joseph Goebbels officially withdrew support, it had already petered out.

Since the end of World War II many of these sites have come to be used as venues for outdoor rock concerts and other musical presentations as well as for theatre.

== Dramas ==
The first dramas performed at Thingplätze had originated earlier. Both Deutsche Passion (German passion) by Richard Euringer, a leading theoretician of the Thingspiel movement, and Symphonie der Arbeit (work symphony) by Hans-Jürgen Nierentz originated as radio plays first performed in 1933 (as Nazi counter-examples to religious Easter and left-wing May Day dramas respectively); Aufbricht Deutschland! (Germany arises!, also 1933) by Gustav Goes was written as a stadium play. Of well known works associated with the movement, Neurode, Spiel von deutscher Arbeit (Neurode, play about German work) by Kurt Heynicke and Das Spiel von Job dem Deutschen (the play about Job the German) by Kurt Eggers were both written in 1932, before the Nazis came to power, and Euringer also first conceived his Deutsche Passion that year. Das Spiel von Job dem Deutschen was performed at a trade fair in November 1933 to serve as an example of the Thingspiel genre. Later Thingspiele included Eggers' Annaberg (1933) and Das große Wandern: Ein Spiel vom ewigen deutschen Schicksal (the great journey: a play about the eternal German fate, 1934), Eberhard Wolfgang Möller's Anruf und Verkündigung der Toten (summons and proclamation of the dead, 1934), Heynicke's Der Weg ins Reich (the way to the Reich, 1935), Die Stedinger (The Stedingers, 1935) by August Hinrichs and Soldaten der Scholle (Soldiers of the soil, 1935) by Erich Müller-Schnick. The most successful was Möller's Frankenburger Würfelspiel, which received its première at the Dietrich-Eckart-Bühne in Berlin in 1936 in association with the 1936 Summer Olympics. Lists of approved Thingspiele were published in 1934 and 1935; some works were omitted from the second list, such as Nierentz's Segen der Bauernschaft (Farmers' Blessing, 1933), which may have been regarded as overemphasising religious rather than political redemption.

Thingspiele generally present redemption through National Socialism: from Germany's suffering caused by the defeat in World War I in Euringer's Deutsche Passion and Heynicke's Der Weg ins Reich, from rapacious and anti-German capitalism in Heynicke's Neurode, from all exploiters who have oppressed the German farmer since the Thirty Years' War in Müller-Schnick's Soldaten der Scholle and in general from the ills of the Weimar Republic, which is indicted as the fount of all problems. Unity and self-denial in the interests of Germany and the Volk are urged.

== Completed theatres ==
=== Official ===
According to Rainer Stommer in his study of the Thing movement, the following official sites were completed (date is that of completion or dedication):

- Annaberg (now Góra Świętej Anny, Poland) 23 August 1936
- Rugard, Bergen auf Rügen 21 June 1936
- Waldbühne, Berlin 2 August 1936
- Borna (de:Volksplatz Borna) 31 August 1935
- Brandenburg 1936?
- Braunschweig (de:Nußberg (Braunschweig)) 18 August 1935
- Drossen (now Ośno Lubuskie, Poland) 1939?
- Freyburg an der Unstrut 1935?
- Glauchau 1937?
- Brandberge, Halle (Saale) 1 May 1934
- Heidelberg 22 June 1935
- Heringsdorf auf Usedom, Pomerania 1 May 1934
- Holzminden 22 September 1934
- Jülich (de: Brückenkopf Jülich) 28 October 1934
- Kamenz (de:Hutberg, Kamenz) 2 June 1935
- Electoral Palace, Koblenz 24 March 1935
- Lamspringe 28 June 1936
- Leutkirch November 1940
- Loreley, St. Goarshausen 21 June 1939
- Northeim 6/7 June 1936
- Veste Oberhaus, Passau 22 September 1935
- Preußisch-Holland (now Pasłęk, Poland) 1936
- Rössel (now Reszel, Poland) 1939?
- Rostock 12 May 1935
- Schildau 1935?
- Schmiedeberg, Saxony 16 September 1934
- Rockelmann, Schwarzenberg, Saxony May 1938
- Kalkberg Stadium, Bad Segeberg 10 October 1937
- Soldin (now Myślibórz, Poland) 1939?
- Stolzenau 10 May 1934
- Tilsit (now Sovetsk, Kaliningrad Oblast, Russia) 30 April 1935
- Werder 1936–38?

=== Unofficial ===
Stommer lists the following theatres that were not officially sanctioned but are known to have been completed (with date of completion or dedication):

- Brusendorf, Mittenwalde, c. 1934
- Bückeberg (Hagenohsen) 1 October 1933; reconstruction in more monumental form incomplete
- Ordensburg Krössinsee 25 April 1936
- Oliva, Danzig (now Gdańsk, Poland) 1 September 1934
- Gerresheim, Düsseldorf 1933, 1938 (renovations of a former sandpit already used as a Thingplatz by Wandervögel by 1920)
- Eichstätt 1938?
- Nied, Frankfurt by 1935; later converted into a monument with marching ground
- Giebelstadt 16 June 1935
- Hösseringen 28 June 1936 (adaptation of a 13th–17th century regional assembly ground)
- Warndt forest, near Karlsbrunn 1938
- Kommern, Mechernich 25 August 1935
- Mainz 1 May 1935 (essentially the same as a park development planned in 1930)
- Mettlach 1936
- Rheinsberg July 1935 (for a national Hitler Youth camp)
- Ordensburg Sonthofen 1 October 1936
- Stedingsehre, Bookholzberg, Ganderkesee (de:Stedingsehre#NS-Kultstätte Freilichtbühne „Stedingsehre“ (Bookholzberg)) 13 July 1935
- Verden an der Aller (de:Sachsenhain) 1935–37 (built as an SS shrine instead of in the form originally planned)
- Ordensburg Vogelsang 25 April 1936
- Wattenscheid 5 July 1936
- Wesselburen September 1935?
- Windsheim 1936

Others inspired by or used by the Thing movement but not listed by Stommer include:

- Freilichtbühne Mülheim an der Ruhr
- Porta Westfalica (de:Goethe-Freilichtbühne Porta Westfalica) (opened 1927)
- Herchen, Windeck (de:Herchen#Sehenswürdigkeiten) (part of a memorial)
- Rathen Open Air Stage

== See also ==
- Nazi architecture
