= The Cavalier's Cup =

1953 novel by John Dickson Carr

- First US edition dustjacket
- Author: John Dickson Carr writing as Carter Dickson
- Language: English
- Series: Henry Merrivale
- Genre: Mystery
- Publisher: Morrow (US, 1953, first edition); Heinemann (UK, 1954)
- Publication date: 1953
- Publication place: United Kingdom
- Pages: 263 (first US hardback ed)
- Preceded by: Behind the Crimson Blind
- Followed by: Fear is the Same

The Cavalier's Cup, first published in 1953, is a mystery novel by the American writer John Dickson Carr (1906–1977), who published it under the name of Carter Dickson. It is a locked room mystery and the final appearance in novel form of the series detective Sir Henry Merrivale and his long-time associate, Scotland Yard's Chief Inspector Humphrey Masters.

== Plot summary ==
At Telford Old Hall, the past is a constant reminder in the present. Long-dead Cavalier Sir Byng Rawdon still haunts the house, and lately has been making his ghostly presence known, it seems.

During his lifetime, he etched a poem into a leaded-glass window with a diamond that is a showpiece of the historic house, along with the heavily jeweled Cavalier's Cup, a family heirloom.

When Sir Henry Merrivale and Chief Inspector Masters arrive to debunk the ghost, Masters agrees to spend the night in the Oak Room with the doors locked and windows latched.

Masters falls asleep and, when he wakes up, he finds that the Cavalier's Cup has been moved from the locked safe and left standing on a nearby table. Also, Sir Byng's sword, which was hanging outside the Oak Room, has been placed at Masters' feet.

Sir Henry and Masters must cope with Telford Old Hall's present-day inhabitants, a visiting American Congressman and Sir Henry's singing teacher in order to reveal who is behind the ghostly manifestations.

== Publication history ==
- 1953, US, William Morrow, Pub date 1953, Hardback, 263pp (first US edition)
- 1954, UK, Heinemann, Pub date 1954, Hardback, 241pp (first UK edition)
- 1960, UK, Pan G412, Pub date 1960, Paperback, 199pp (first UK pb edition)
- 1987, US, Zebra ISBN 0-8217-2170-4, Pub date 1987, Paperback (first US pb edition)
