= Freilichtbühne Mülheim an der Ruhr =

Coordinates: 51°25′19″N 6°53′09″E

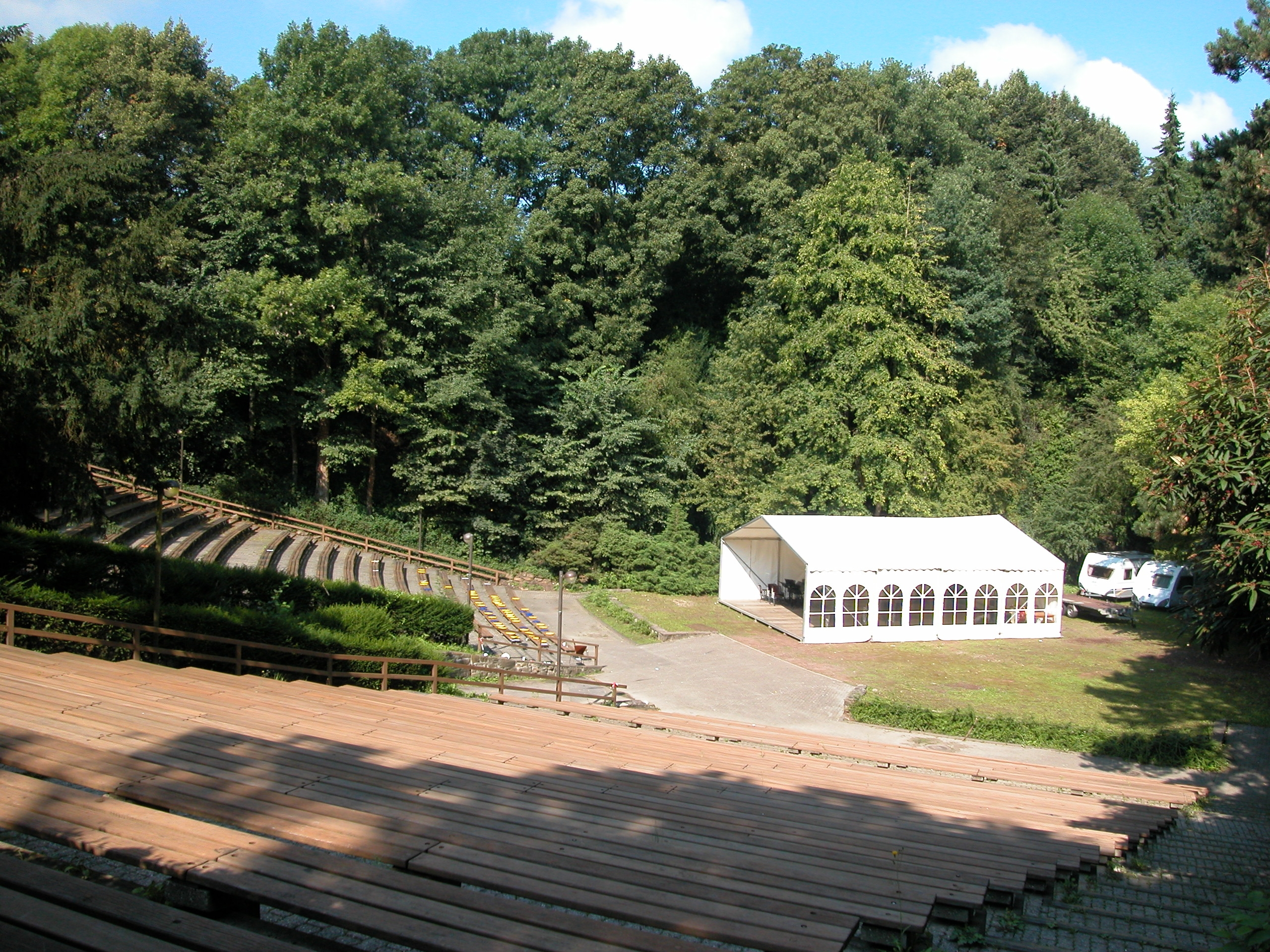
View of the stage, Freilichtbühne Mülheim an der Ruhr

The Freilichtbühne Mülheim an der Ruhr (Mülheim an der Ruhr Open-Air Theatre) is an open-air amphitheatre in North Rhine-Westphalia, Germany, built in 1936 as a Nazi Thingplatz. It is the most important open-air theatre in the Rhine-Ruhr region and with 2,000 seats, one of the largest in Germany.

== Location ==
The theatre is only a few hundred metres from the former centre of Mülheim, now known as the Kirchenhügel (church hill). It was constructed in a former quarry across the street from the old city cemetery, and is within a city park. It has both a large and a small stage.

== History ==
=== Construction, use in the Third Reich ===
In the early 1930s, the parks director of Mülheim, Fritz Keßler, was seeking a way to make the former quarry into a park instead of letting it laps into a dump. As a result of the Great Depression, there was not enough money to construct the park until the Volunteer Labour Service made it an unemployment relief project, which reduced the projected cost to the city from 29,800 to 14,100 RM. However, in May 1933 funds ran out and the project was left unfinished. To make up for the loss of funds, Keßler arranged for the footpaths to be finished by city relief recipients, who received extra money each month in payment.

Later the same year, the project was taken over by the Reich Labour Service and the open-air theatre was added to the plans in the context of the Thingspiel movement. The theatre was designed by the city itself, and work directed by Erich Schulzke of the parks department. The park opened three years later, the theatre being ceremonially opened with a performance of Shakespeare's A Midsummer Night's Dream on the small stage on 28 June 1936, a Sunday evening in midsummer. The enthusiasm for the production was strong, and the limit of 3,000 tickets necessitated a repeat performance, scheduled for the following night.

The open-air theatres built under the Third Reich as part of the Thingspiel movement were used for community-building and political events as well as traditional theatre. The Mülheim theatre was used, for example, for inductions into the League of German Girls. During wartime, there were no performances and people stripped the theatre of its wooden benches to use as firewood.

=== Modern use ===
After the war, the theatre was eventually repaired and reopened on 30 June 1954 with a performance of Bizet's opera Carmen that drew 2,300 people: standing-room-only tickets were sold for 50 pfennings. From then until 1965, it was used for a total of 56 performances of operas, operettas and dramas. It was then fell into disuse until summer 1971, when the only Karl May Festival in Mülheim took place as an addition to the festival in Bad Segeberg and Old Shatterhand und Winnetou - Geheimnis der Bonanza (Old Shatterhand and Winnetou - Secret of the Bonanza) was staged there.

In 2000, the newly founded "Freunde der Europa-Freilichtbühne Mülheim" (Friends of the Mülheim Europe Open-Air Theatre), the city and other cultural organisations decided to use the theatre to present a broad spectrum of entertainment including concerts and theatre of all kinds. In 2003 they were joined by Regler Produktion, which has since produced numerous events there. Improvements made in 2006 and 2008 include provision for permanent refreshment service. In 2006, events associated with the World Cup attracted a new audience, and since 2007 Regler have provided acoustic performances on summer Wednesday evenings under the title "Sunset Folks". At those and other Regler events at the theatre, the proceeds from sponsorships and refreshment sales are put back into the theatre and its equipment and the performers are paid by "passing the hat".

The city leases the theatre to the Friends of the Theatre organisation, which changed its name in 2009 from "Verein der Freunde der Europa-Freilichtbühne in Mülheim an der Ruhr e. V." to "Freunde der Freilichtbühne Mülheim an der Ruhr e. V." (Friends of the Mülheim an der Ruhr Open-Air Theatre"). As of February 2013, however, the possibility is being discussed of Regler leasing it autonomously rather than working with them.

Since 2012 Regler, the city culture office, the Theater an der Ruhr, the Ringlokschuppen (a former roundhouse also used for performances) and the Department for Children, Youth and Schools have together organised the Mülheimer Ruhrsommer (Mülheim Ruhr Summer).
