= The Plague Court Murders =

1934 novel by John Dickson Carr

- First US edition dustjacket
- Author: John Dickson Carr writing as Carter Dickson
- Language: English
- Series: Henry Merrivale
- Genre: Mystery
- Publisher: Morrow (US, 1934); Heinemann (UK, 1935)
- Publication date: 1934
- Publication place: United Kingdom
- Media type: Print (hardback & paperback)
- Pages: 312 (first US hardback ed)
- Followed by: The White Priory Murders

The Plague Court Murders is a mystery novel by the American writer John Dickson Carr, who wrote it under the name of Carter Dickson. The first Sir Henry Merrivale mystery, it is a locked room mystery of the subtype known as an "impossible crime".

== Plot summary ==
Ken Blake is approached by an old friend, Dean Halliday, who tells the story of his family estate, Plague Court. Halliday explains that the house is haunted by the ghost of the original owner, Louis Playge, a hangman by profession. Halliday invites Blake and Chief-Inspector Humphrey Masters to Plague Court to take part in a seance, run by psychic Roger Darworth and his medium Joseph.

However, Darworth is a fake, being monitored by the police. The night of the seance, Darworth locks himself in a small stone house, behind Plague Court, while the seance proceeds. When Masters and Blake go to get him, he has been stabbed to death, with the dagger of Louis Playge.

But all the doors and windows are bolted and locked, and thirty feet of mud surrounds the house, unbroken—and all the suspects have been holding hands in the seance.

The only one who can solve the crime is locked room expert Sir Henry Merrivale.

== Literary significance and criticism ==
"One of this author's celebrated locked-and-barred-room mysteries ... The telling ... is reasonably straightforward, but the plot being told is a clutter about a phony psychic investigator and his boy "medium" ... Lots of talk, some but not much detection by Sir Henry Merrivale. The great stunt at the end is unforgivably preposterous (in the literal sense)."

Chief-Inspector Masters so dominated the first 180 pages of the book, that the first US paperback edition's cover (Avon #7, 1941) said "A Chief Inspector Masters novel".
