= My Late Wives =

1946 mystery novel by John Dickson Carr

- First edition (US)
- Author: John Dickson Carr writing as "Carter Dickson"
- Language: English
- Series: Henry Merrivale
- Genre: Mystery, detective
- Publisher: Morrow (US, 1946, first edition); Heinemann (UK, 1947)
- Publication date: 1946
- Publication place: United Kingdom
- Media type: Print (hardback & paperback)
- Pages: 282
- Preceded by: The Curse of the Bronze Lamp
- Followed by: The Skeleton in the Clock

My Late Wives is a mystery novel by the American writer John Dickson Carr, who published it under the name of Carter Dickson. It is a whodunnit featuring the series detective Sir Henry Merrivale and his long-time associate, Scotland Yard's Chief Inspector Humphrey Masters.

== Plot summary ==
Roger Bewlay is a murderer; the British police are sure he's a murderer, and so is noted detective and explainer of the impossible, Sir Henry Merrivale. Bewlay has married at least four women who promptly vanish on their honeymoons.

Unfortunately, Bewlay himself has also vanished.

Years later, a well-known actor receives the script of a play about Roger Bewlay from an anonymous source, which he determines to produce and in which he will star. The script contains information known only to the police, one witness and Roger Bewlay himself. That reopens the old case and involves the actor, his good-looking female director, and a woman named Mildred Lyons who soon turns up dead in the actor's bedroom.

Sir Henry Merrivale must identify Roger Bewlay's new identity and figure out the best place to hide a corpse.
