= The Curse of the Bronze Lamp =

Mystery novel by John Dickson Carr

The Curse of the Bronze Lamp (also published as Lord of the Sorcerers)
- First edition (US)
- Author: John Dickson Carr writing as "Carter Dickson"
- Language: English
- Series: Henry Merrivale
- Genre: Mystery, detective
- Publisher: Morrow (US 1945); Heinemann (UK, 1946)
- Publication date: 1945
- Publication place: United Kingdom
- Media type: Print (hardback & paperback)
- Pages: 214 (first US edition)
- Preceded by: He Wouldn't Kill Patience
- Followed by: My Late Wives

The Curse of the Bronze Lamp (also published as Lord of the Sorcerers) is a mystery novel by the American writer John Dickson Carr, who published it under the name of Carter Dickson. It is a locked room mystery or, more properly, a subset of that category known as an "impossible crime", and features the series detective Sir Henry Merrivale. Carr considered this one of his best impossible crime novels.

== Plot summary ==
Lady Helen Loring does not believe in the ancient Egyptian curse associated with an ancient artifact, a bronze lamp that is a gift from the Egyptian government. It comes from a tomb that Helen and her father, Lord Severn, helped excavate.

In defiance of the dire predictions of an Egyptian soothsayer, she brings the lamp back to Severn Hall, her ancestral home in England. At the door, Helen stepped out of the car, leaving her friends to follow her into the Hall.

Less than three minutes later, they did—and Helen had vanished. On the floor, in the middle of the vast entrance hall, were her coat and the bronze lamp.

Sir Henry Merrivale is nearby and unafraid of any and all spirits and soothsayers; after a murder shocks the inhabitants of Severn Hall, he solves both the disappearance and the murder.
