= The Skeleton in the Clock =

1948 novel by John Dickson Carr

- First edition (US)
- Author: John Dickson Carr writing as "Carter Dickson"
- Language: English
- Series: Henry Merrivale
- Genre: Mystery, detective
- Publisher: Morrow (US, 1948); Heinemann (UK, 1949)
- Publication place: United Kingdom
- Media type: Print (hardback & paperback)
- Pages: 282 (first US editions)
- Preceded by: My Late Wives
- Followed by: A Graveyard To Let

The Skeleton in the Clock is a 1948 mystery novel by the American writer John Dickson Carr, who published it under the name of Carter Dickson. It is a whodunnit and features the series detective Sir Henry Merrivale and his long-time associate, Scotland Yard's Chief Inspector Humphrey Masters.

== Plot summary ==
Martin Drake meets Jennifer West in an auction house. Three years ago, he had fallen in love with her during a brief but intense encounter on a railway platform—after which she vanished. Now it seems she is engaged to Richard Fleet, whom she has known since they were children together. And when they were children, Richard's father Sir George died when he fell off the roof of their home, Fleet House. It was generally accepted as an accident, but a series of mysterious happenings cause the case to be re-opened.

Sir Henry Merrivale, detective and explainer of the impossible, is also at the auction and revives his old antagonism with Sophia, Dowager Countess of Brale, who is Jenny's grandmother. Arthur Puckston keeps the pub across the road from Fleet House and was an eyewitness to Sir George's death.

When his daughter, Enid Puckston, is found murdered in what might be a haunted prison, Sir Henry takes a hand and reveals not only the identity of the murderer but the unusual psychology that underlies the case.
