= She Died a Lady =

1943 mystery novel by John Dickson Carr

- First edition (US)
- Author: John Dickson Carr writing as "Carter Dickson"
- Language: English
- Series: Henry Merrivale
- Genre: Mystery fiction Detective fiction
- Publisher: Morrow (US, 1943); Heinemann (UK, 1943)
- Publication date: 1943
- Publication place: United Kingdom
- Media type: Print (hardback & paperback)
- Pages: 266
- Preceded by: The Gilded Man
- Followed by: He Wouldn't Kill Patience

She Died a Lady is a mystery novel by American writer John Dickson Carr, who published it under the pen name of Carter Dickson. It is a whodunnit featuring the series detective Sir Henry Merrivale.

== Plot summary ==
Elderly Dr. Luke Croxley narrates a story with a very old theme set against the English village of Lynmouth.

Rita Wainwright is 38, "a mature beauty with a weakness for younger men". Her gentle husband, Alec, more than 20 years older, seems more interested in radio broadcasts of World War II news than in his wife's notorious affair with a handsome young American actor, Barry Sullivan.

Rita and Barry decide to run away together but a radio performance of Romeo and Juliet apparently turns their minds to a romantic double suicide. After the broadcast, their twin lines of footprints lead up to the edge of a cliff overlooking the ocean, and none return. When their bodies are found, though, it is found that both of them had been shot through the heart at very close range, "body range, with some small-calibre weapon".

Sir Henry Merrivale is in the neighbourhood posing for a portrait by a local artist (in the garb of a Roman Senator), and agrees to investigate this baffling mystery, which he solves just in time to take his place in the House of Lords.

== Literary significance and criticism ==
According to Jacques Barzun and Wendell Hertig Taylor, "This is another tale in which Merrivale is loud and tantrum-y but tolerable, and the narration more continuous and sane than usual. But these merits are only relative. The circus atmosphere is still present. ... Setting and situation cannot fail to attract the reader; but by the end the multiplication of farfetched clues and the twists and double twists in the evidence exceed the limit, just like the horseplay by and about Sir Henry. As for detection properly so called, it is there but obscured by the foregoing."
