= He Wouldn't Kill Patience =

1944 novel by John Dickson Carr

- First edition (US)
- Author: John Dickson Carr writing as "Carter Dickson"
- Language: English
- Series: Henry Merrivale
- Genre: Mystery, detective fiction
- Publisher: Morrow (US, 1944); Heinemann (UK, 1944)
- Publication date: 1944
- Publication place: United Kingdom
- Media type: Print (hardback & paperback)
- Pages: 217 (first US edition)
- Preceded by: She Died A Lady
- Followed by: The Curse of the Bronze Lamp

He Wouldn't Kill Patience is a mystery novel by the American writer John Dickson Carr, who published it under the name of Carter Dickson. It is a locked room mystery and features the series detective Sir Henry Merrivale and his long-time associate, Scotland Yard's Chief Inspector Humphrey Masters.

== Plot summary ==
The Dell mapback edition of 1950 is subtitled "Murder in the Zoo".

Edward Benton, director of the Royal Albert Zoological Gardens, is worried about what the year 1941 will bring to his beloved collection of snakes and reptiles; it seems as if they will be destroyed, at the request of the Department of Home Security, to prevent poisonous snakes from escaping in the case of an air raid. Nevertheless, he is still making arrangements to add to the exhibits, including a recent acquisition, "Patience", a tree-snake from Borneo.

Accomplished stage magicians Carey Quint and Madge Palliser, whose families’ professional rivalry goes back four generations, are visiting the zoo, each to research certain snakes in connection with an illusion which both claim was invented by an ancestor. They quarrel, and somehow the glass cage breaks that encloses a tropical American lizard. The lizard immediately attacks Sir Henry Merrivale, also a visitor. After the lizard is subdued, all three are led by the security guard to Dr. Benton's home on the grounds, to make their explanations and apologies. He is easily mollified, and his daughter Louise invites all three to dinner that evening. Louise is worried about her father's mental equilibrium.

When the three arrive to find what seems to be an empty house, with dinner burning away merrily in the kitchen, they are perplexed. Then they discover Dr. Benton has apparently locked all the doors and windows of his study, sealed them with paper strips, and gassed himself. Louise asks Sir Henry to investigate because she is sure that, even in committing suicide, her father would not have killed the innocent tree-snake, Patience.

Sir Henry must investigate against the backdrop of England in 1940, with airplanes constantly buzzing overhead. The involvement of two professional magicians, however, points out a path to a solution — to make people think they've experienced something which indeed they have not.

Sir Henry corners the murderer and extracts a confession in a dramatic climax that involves a rattlesnake, a mamba and a cobra.
