= Beyond the Mexique Bay =

Book by Aldous Huxley

- First edition cover
- Author: Aldous Huxley
- Genre: Travel
- Publisher: Chatto & Windus
- Publication date: 1934

Beyond the Mexique Bay is a book of travel essays by Aldous Huxley, first published in 1934. In it, he describes his experiences traveling through the Caribbean to Guatemala and southern Mexico in 1933. The work is named for a line in Andrew Marvell's poem, "Bermudas."

== Background ==
In 1933, Huxley was at work on the novel that would become Eyeless in Gaza. However, struggling with the writing, Huxley "abandoned himself to travel," according to biographer Sybille Bedford. Huxley and his wife, Maria, left Liverpool in January 1933, and traveled to the West Indies on the cruise ship Britannic. They left the ship in Kingston, Jamaica, and traveled through British Honduras and Guatemala, where they persuaded coffee plantation owner Roy Fenton to take them by mule to his land in Mexico. Huxley and his wife returned to New York by May. The coffee plantation visit, and many other stories Huxley recorded in Beyond the Mexique Bay, would be later fictionalized in Eyeless in Gaza. For instance, Dr MacPhail, the Scottish doctor they stayed with in Guatemala, was the basis for character Dr Miller.

The final essay in Beyond the Mexique Bay is a critique of former mentor D. H. Lawrence's The Plumed Serpent and a partial repudiation of Lawrence's views on civilization.

A major theme of Beyond the Mexique Bay was Huxley's critique of totalitarianism and fascism, in particular Adolf Hitler's rise to power in Germany; in one essay, Huxley described the Nazi regime as "a rebellion against Western civilization.". Many of Huxley's German publishers balked at this, and these sections were expunged when the book was published by Germany's Albatross Books in 1935.
