= Anton Wachter cycle =

Protagonist of eight novels by Simon Vestdijk

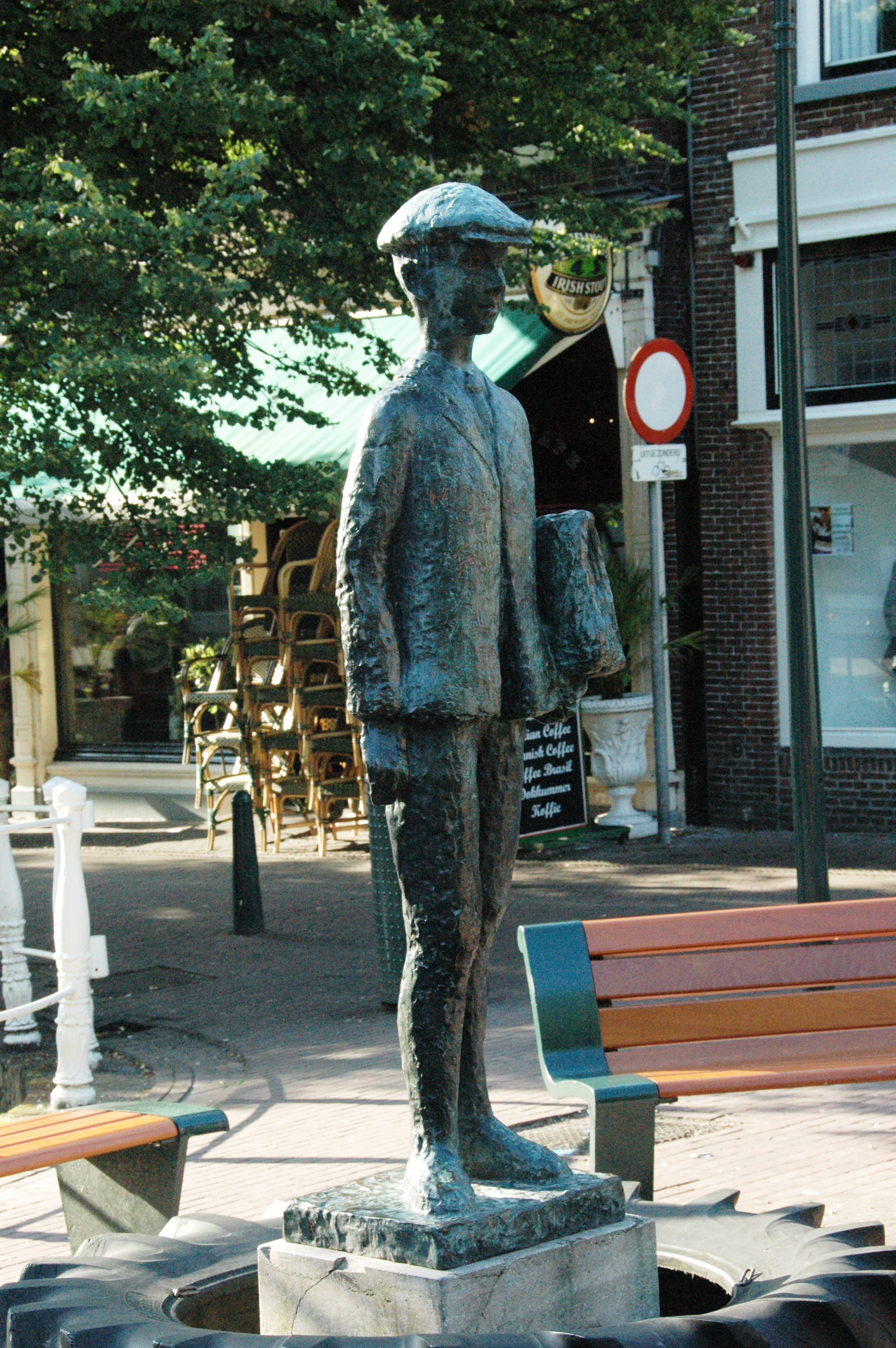
Statue of Anton Wachter in Harlingen

Anton Wachter is the protagonist of eight novels by Dutch author Simon Vestdijk.

The life of Wachter is captured in eight semi-autobiographical novels considered central to Vestdijk's oeuvre. The first four volumes are set in the town of Lahringen, meaning Harlingen, where Vestdijk was born and raised. The last four volumes are set in Amsterdam and describe the life of Wachter/Vestdijk as a medical student.

== Books ==
- Sint Sebastiaan (1939)
- Surrogaten voor Murk Tuinstra (1948)
- Terug tot Ina Damman (1934)
- De Andere School (1949)
- De Beker van de Min (1956)
- De Vrije Vogel en Zijn Kooien (1957)
- De Rimpels van Esther Ornstein (1959)
- De Laatste Kans (1960)

== Origin ==
The first three novels originate from Vestdijk's ambitious debut novel, Kind tussen vier vrouwen ("Child between four women"). Written in 1933, it was rejected by the publisher, but published posthumously in 1972.

The first novel in the cycle's chronology, Sint Sebastiaan, derived its name from a painting of the saint by Alonso Cano Vestdijk admired in the Rijksmuseum in Amsterdam. From an early age Vestdijk spent vacations in Amsterdam, and returned there frequently, during his studies in Utrecht and after he moved to Doorn, also to enjoy "the pool of sinful and forbidden things".

== Statue ==
A statue of Anton Wachter by Suze Boschma-Berkhout, in Harlingen's Voorstraat, was unveiled in 1973.
