= Karl Joel (philosopher) =

German philosopher (1864–1934)

Karl Joel (27 March 1864 – 23 July 1934) was a German philosopher and professor.

Joel was born in Hirschberg, Silesia, Kingdom of Prussia, and died in Walenstadt, Switzerland. His father was a rabbi who studied under Schelling. Joel was a professor at the University of Basel from 1902. His father R. Herman Joel, had been a pupil of Schelling and apparently had a great influence on his son's attitude toward philosophy. He was born in Hirschberg, studied in Leipzig, and spent some time in Berlin (1887–92), where he became a friend of Georg Simmel. In 1897 he was appointed to the University of Basle, where he taught until his death.

Joel called his philosophical system "New Idealism". He defended the completeness of philosophy against the attempts to divide it up into "specialized" branches and compartments, and he emphasized the necessity of a comprehensive outlook. He opposed methodological positivism and metaphysical naturalism and sought to ridicule those who claimed "objectivity" in the study of reality, that is, spiritual activity deprived of all subjective and emotional ingredients. One of his famous quotes is, "I lie on the seashore, the sparkling flood blue-shimmering in my dreamy eyes; light breezes flutter in the distance; the thud of the waves, charging and breaking over in foam, beats thrillingly and drowsily upon the shore---or upon the ear? I cannot tell. The far and the near become blurred into one; outside and inside merge into one another. Nearer and nearer, friendlier, like a homecoming, sounds the thud of the waves; now, like a thundering pulse, they beat in my head, now they beat over my soul, wrapping it round, consuming it, while at the same time my soul floats out of me as a blue waste of waters. Outside and inside are one. The whole symphony of sensations fades away into one tone, all senses become one sense, which is one with feeling; the world expires in the soul and the soul dissolves in the world."

== Literary works ==
- Wandlungen der Weltanschauung, 2 Bde., 1928–34
- Nietzsche und die Romantik, 1905
- Ursprung der Naturphilosophie aus dem Geiste der Mystik, 1906
- Seele und Welt: Versuch einer organischen Auffassung, 1912
- Geschichte der antiken Philosophie, 1. Bd., 1921
