= Terug tot Ina Damman =

Novel of Simon Vestdijk

Terug tot Ina Damman ("Return to Ina Damman", 1934) is a novel by Dutch author Simon Vestdijk. First published in 1934, it is one of Vestdijk's most popular novels. It is the third installment in the Anton Wachter cycle, a series of eight novels whose protagonist is Anton Wachter, the author's alter ego. His entire existence as an artist, Vestdijk later wrote Theun de Vries, originates in his "Ina Damman experience".

== Content ==
Terug tot Ina Damman describes Wachter's first three years at the Hogere Burgerschool and his infatuation with a girl, Ina Damman. The boy, whose father has just died, lives in the town of Lahringen, based on Vestdijk's hometown Harlingen. The novel originates from Alleen tussen vier vrouwen ("Alone between four women"), Vestdijk's voluminous debut novel which was rejected by publishers; it covered the early part of Wachter's life including the Ina Damman episode. The titular character is based on a girl called Lies Koning, Vestdijk's schoolmate at the HBS in Harlingen and his unrequited love. The "four women" of his debut are considered representative of four erotic objects: the mother, the idealized dream woman, the flesh-and-blood lover, and the object of lust. Lies Koning, who rejected Vestdijk when he was fourteen, represents the second type.

The novel consists of three parts: "Het woord" ("The word"), "Ina Damman", and "De overwinning" ("The victory"). The "word" of the first part is "vent" ("man", colloquially), Wachter's father's nickname for his son; the schoolchildren, prompted by the school bully, start calling Wachter "vent", singling him out and alienating him. He only learns to ignore them in the second year when he imagines himself in love with Ina Damman, whose real name is Antonia, and thus is a projection of the protagonist: "she embodies the ideal image he has of himself, the suspicion of his possibilities". One schoolyear long he walks her to the train station, carries her bag, exchanges a few words with her, until she dumps him. Wachter shifts his erotic desire to a domestic servant called Janke (a type of Else Böhler, who figures in a later Vestdijk novel). "The victory" delves into Wachter's idealization of one of the teachers, Greve; a fight with a schoolboy which he wins; and the ensuing success with formerly unattainable girls. This victory leads him back to himself—back to Ina Damman—which in turn allows him to remain grounded while accepting his sensitivity and his budding artistry.

== Legacy ==
The "classic novel" ranks #40 in the Canon of Dutch Literature (Vestdijk occupying #15 among authors). Maarten 't Hart's bestselling novel Een vlucht regenwulpen is considered a "modernized version" of Terug tot Ina Damman. In a lengthy review of Vestdijk's Else Böhler, Duitsch Dienstmeisje (1935), Menno ter Braak argued that the later novel is a sort of polar opposite of the earlier: "Anton Wachter, the schoolboy in his boy's world, in which the reality of the imagination can still conquer touch with life itself, has grown up in the new novel and is called Mr. Johan Roodenhuis; Ina Damman, the far-removed, platonic one has come frighteningly close and is called Else Böhler, German servant girl".

In the 1950s and 1960s, Terug tot Ina Damman was one of the Vestdijk novels found on the reading list of every high school student in the Netherlands. Since then Vestdijk's popularity, and that of Ina Damman, has plummeted.
