= Freilichtbühne Loreley =

Open-air theatre in St. Goarshausen, Germany

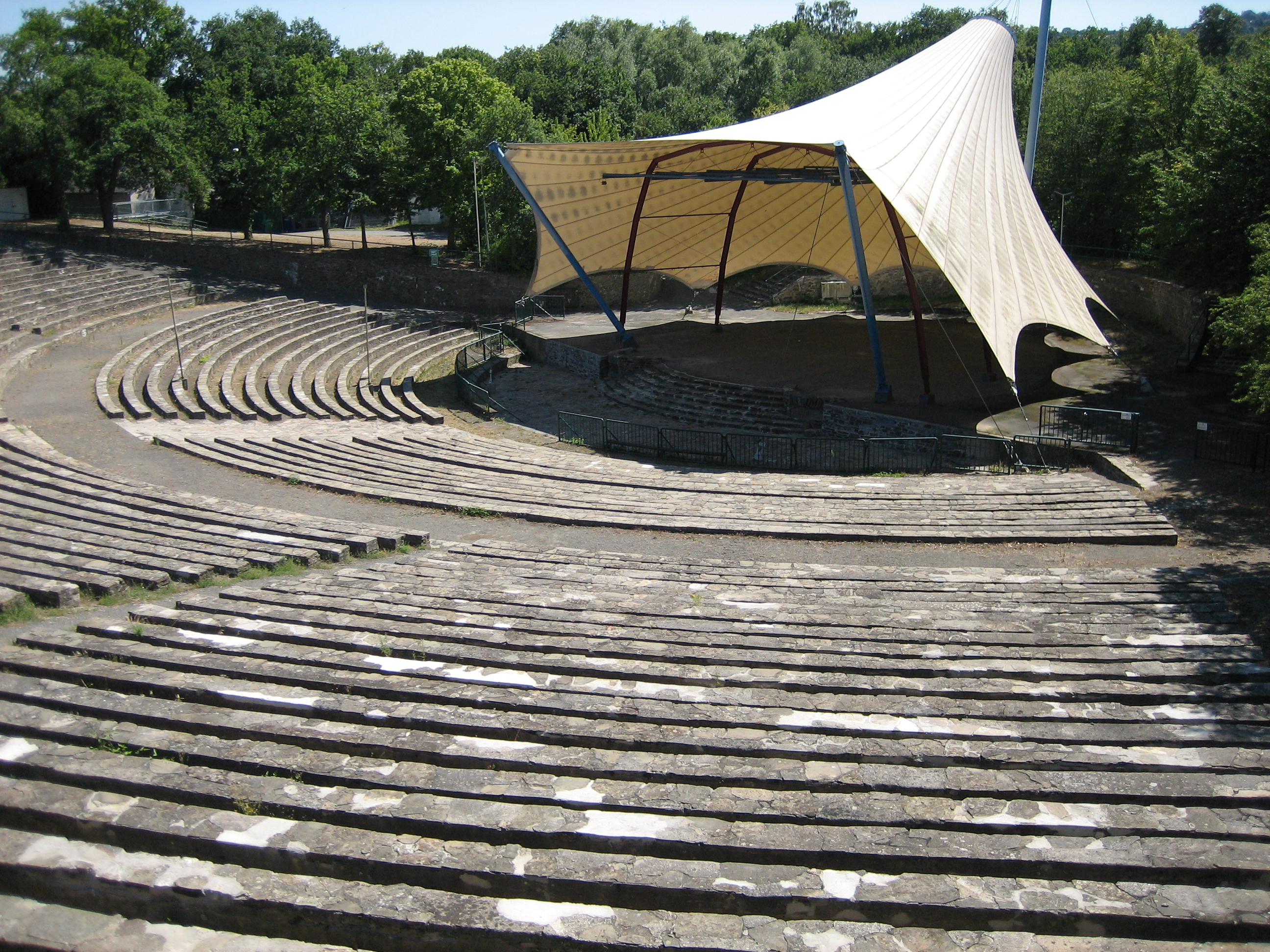
- View of the stage at Freilichtbühne Loreley
- Interactive map of Freilichtbühne Loreley
- Address: Auf der Loreley, 56346
- Location: Sankt Goarshausen, Germany
- Coordinates: 50.142°N 7.731°E
- Owner: Loreley Venue Management GmbH
- Capacity: 15,000
- Type: Amphitheatre

Construction
- Built: 1934–39
- Opened: 21 June 1939
- Architect: Hermann Senf

Website
- loreley-freilichtbuehne.de

The Freilichtbühne Loreley (Loreley Open-Air Theatre) is an amphitheatre located on top of the Lorelei rock in St. Goarshausen, Germany. Designed by Hermann Senf, it was built between 1934 and 1939 as one of the Nazi Thingplätze and is one of the best known of these. It has been used continuously since World War II, initially mainly for theatrical performances and since 1976, mainly for rock concerts.

== Third Reich ==
The arena was designed by Hermann Senf, who referred to the Loreley rock as a "kind of shrine". It is one of the best known of the Thingspielplätze, which were built by the Nazi regime for cultural events.

Construction lasted from 1934 to 1939, and the opening took place on 21 June with a performance of Schiller's Wilhelm Tell.

== Post-war ==
After World War II, the facility was the site of an international camp for European youth in the summer of 1951, and was then used for the presentation of classic drama from 1952 to 1967. In 1968, it began to be used for both orchestral and pop concerts, and since 1976, when Genesis played there, it has been used mainly for rock concerts, but also for films and religious services. Other rock performers who have appeared there include the Ramones, Metallica, the Red Hot Chili Peppers, Thin Lizzy, Joe Cocker, Rainbow, the Kinks, Eric Burdon, Marillion, Gary Moore, R.E.M., and Muse. Since 1981, it has been a frequent location for Westdeutscher Rundfunk's Rockpalast and from 1981 to 1985, it hosted the affiliated Loreley Open Air Festivals. On 20 August 1983, the Irish rock band U2 performed at the amphitheatre. Five of the songs played that night ended up on their live album Under a Blood Red Sky. From 2006 until 2024, the annual Night of the Prog music festival was held there, with the exception of 2020, when it was cancelled due to the COVID-19 pandemic.

The Loreley theatre holds 5,000 seats and has a capacity of about 15,000. Formerly managed by SMG Europe, the venue is now run by Loreley Venue Management GmbH, which was registered in 2010. Since 2000, non-event visits to the arena have been permitted.
