= Lorna Lewis (writer) =

British writer

Lorna Concanen Lewis (1900 - 1962) was a British writer who published a number of popular children's books during the middle part of the 20th century. Among these, the best known is perhaps Leonardo the Inventor, which was included in the New Windmill Series of children's books under the Heinemann imprint.

Lewis was born in Surbiton (now in London) to father Francis Ball Lewis and mother Hester Beryl Press. Her brother was Frank Concanen Lewis (d. 1917). Lewis graduated with a degree in philosophy from University College, London in 1924. She worked in a variety of roles, including on Time and Tide magazine in the 1930s as book reviewer and organiser, and was a good friend of EM Delafield. Lewis died in Knightsbridge.

== Selected works ==
- The Little French Poodle (1934)
- The Children's Holiday Book of Verse (1935) (editor)
- Jubilee and Her Mother (1936)
- Zoo Roundabout (1937)
- The Children's Zoo (1939)
- Holiday Luck (1939)
- Nine Dogs (1940)
- Tea and Hot Bombs (1943)
- Feud in the Factory (1944)
- Marriotts Go North (1949)
- June Grey: Fashion Student (1953)
- Hotel Doorway (1953)
