= Richard Euringer =

German writer (1891–1953)

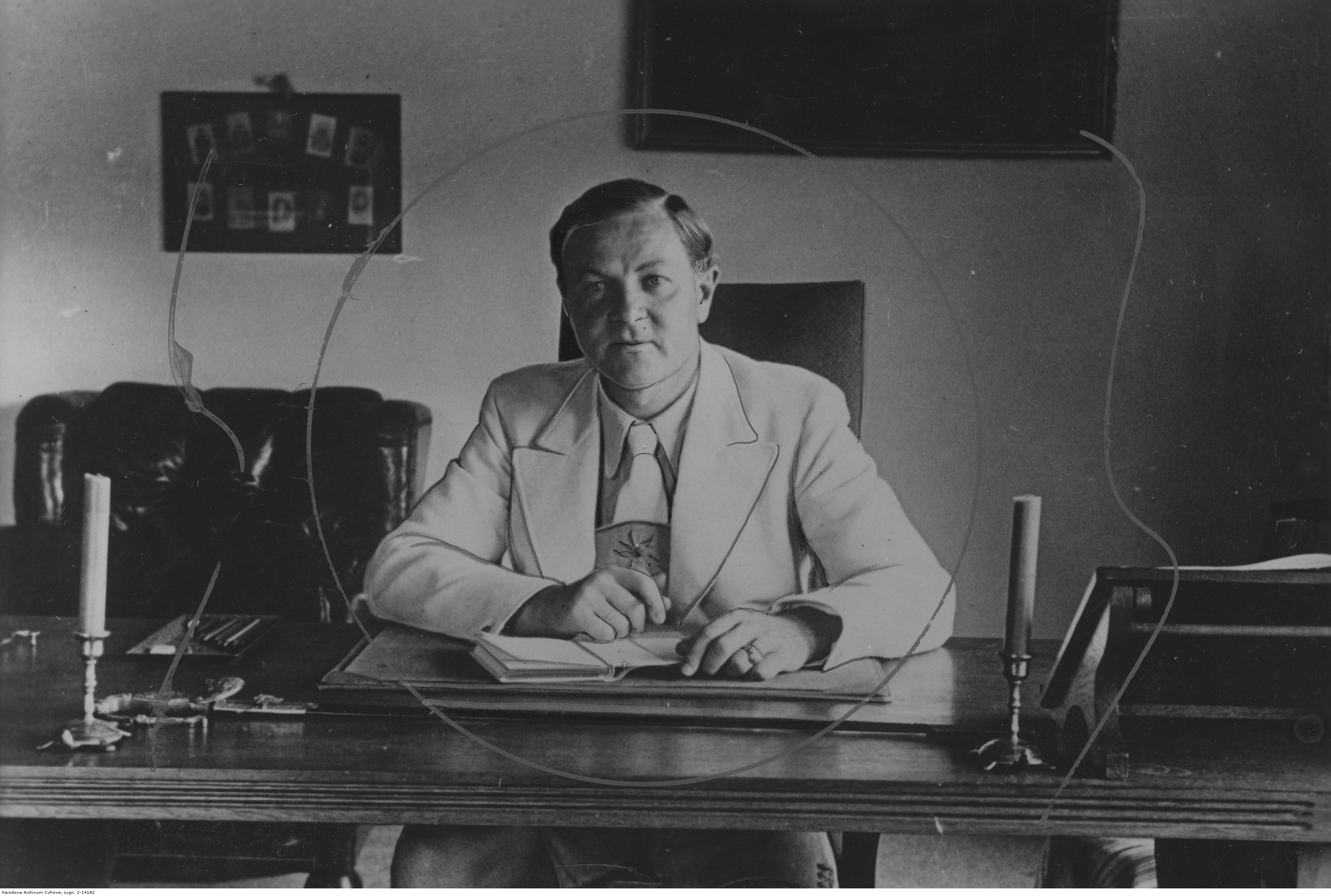
Image of Richard Euringer

Richard Euringer (4 April 1891 – 29 August 1953) was a German writer. Although active starting in the 1920s, he is best known for his later career, in which he was a supporter of the Nazis. His best-known work is probably Als Flieger in zwei Kriegen, published in 1941 by Philipp Reclam Jr. of Leipzig. From 1950 he published under the pseudonym Florian Ammer.

Euringer was born in Augsburg, where he attended Gymnasium. He then became a soldier and officer, and in World War I enlisted as a pilot, serving time on the western front from 1914 to 1916. He fought alongside the Turks in Syria and later took up the position of commander of the Flying School at Lechfeld, Bavaria. In the turbulent years after the war, he was perturbed and roved around, becoming in the process one of the earliest members of the NSDAP. After the war he took up writing, and published several books. Of the numerous novels he wrote, some carry undertones of his war experiences. Some of his most acclaimed works were Fliegerschule 4 (1929), Vortrupp Pascha (1937), Der Zug durch die Wüste (1938), Die Arbeitslosen (1930), and Die Fürsten fallen (1935).

Starting in 1931, he became a political-cultural correspondent for the Völkischer Beobachter, a Nazi newspaper. In 1933, his work Deutsche Passion attracted the attention of Joseph Goebbels, gaining him for the first time national attention. In 1933, he also became a director of the libraries in Essen. In this capacity, he identified 18,000 works deemed not to correspond with Nazi ideology, which were publicly burned as a result. In 1934 he became a member of the advisory boards for writing and broadcasting in the Reich. After 1936, he worked as a freelance writer.
