= Brandberge =

Coordinates: 51°30′35″N 11°55′41″E

The Brandberge is a protected natural area in Saxony-Anhalt, Germany, in the northwest of Halle. It is part of the Naturpark Unteres Saaletal, a protected landscape area which extends along the River Saale from Halle to Nienburg. In the past it has been used for military exercises and winter sports; during the Nazi era, the first official Thingplatz arena was built there.

== Geography and geology ==
The Brandberge covers an area of 90.54 hectares (223.7 acres) in the northwest of Halle, between Kröllwitz and Heide Nord, on the edge of the Hercynian strike; cold south-southwest winds channelled by the area have an important influence on local weather.

The area is characterised by multiple groups of porphyry hillocks, with flat areas near the Saale. In the centre of the porphyry is a less hilly area with remnants of early Tertiary kaolin crusts and Tertiary sediments. Between the Saale and its tributary the Hechtgraben, a dry substrate of gravel deposits has formed which breaks the surface in places.

== Flora and fauna ==
The Brandberge was declared a protected natural area on 19 June 1996 and forms part of the Naturpark Unteres Saaletal. It is registered under the European Union Habitats Directive under the name Brandberge in Halle. However, 40 hectares (99 acres) passed into private hands in September 2003.

As a botanic habitat, the Brandberge is characterised by arid and semi-arid grassland and heathland vegetation on the porphyry hillocks, in addition to ponds and reedbeds, wet woodland and boggy areas in the central region, semi-bare areas and sparse arable land. The flora includes some worthy of protection such as Polygala vulgaris, Pulsatilla vulgaris, Lychnis flos-cuculi and Ranunculus aquatilis, and also some extremely endangered plant communities. The heathland is being encroached upon by bushes, but this process can be kept in check by cutting.

The fauna is unusually varied, including the European hare, the European stonechat, the shrike, the diving bell spider and many kinds of amphibians and reptiles, such as the natterjack toad, northern crested newt and grass snake. Waders and songbirds use the area as a brooding site, raptors use the arable land as a source of prey, and the entire area has an extremely varied insect population including the scarce blue-tailed damselfly and small emerald damselfly.

== Human use ==
Archaeological finds from the Celtic Corded Ware and La Tène cultures and also a former Germanic "Thing" site have been located at the Brandberge.

In the 1930s, the area was a popular location for winter sports. After World War II until the end of 2007, it was used as a proving ground by the Soviet Red Army, the East German National People's Army and, after German reunification, the Bundeswehr. This was detrimental to plant and animal life but also reduced human interference with the fauna. After the Soviet withdrawal in 1990/91, there was some refuse deposition. The only current commercial use is sheep pasture.

== Nazi arena ==
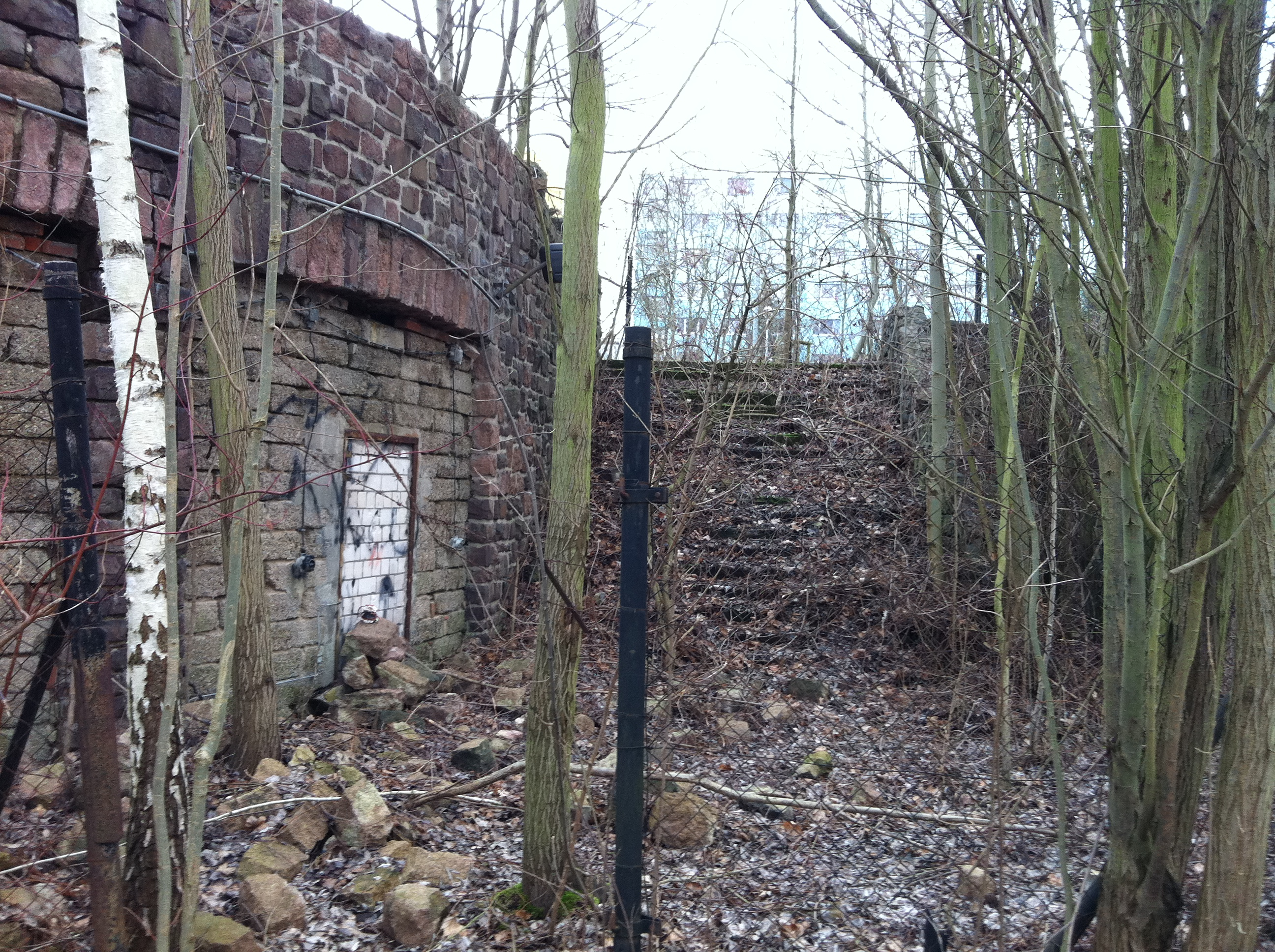
Ruins of the Nazi arena

A flat area within the Brandberge which had been used for military exercises had also been an assembly area for Nazis, and that and the Germanic "Thing" site led to its being selected for the first official open-air theatre, or Thingplatz, in association with the Thingspiel movement of nationalistic multi-disciplinary theatre. (In actuality, it turned out to be the Celtic burials that lay above the arena site.) Ground was ceremonially broken on 19 February 1934 in front of 110,000 spectators, three times the number expected. Work was hurriedly completed so that the theatre could be dedicated that May 1, on the "National Day of Work", but the first performance did not take place until 5 June.

The theatre was designed by Ludwig Moshamer and placed on a site abutting the existing assembly field, roughly extending its semi-circular shape with a parabolic amphitheatre (rather than the oval of most of the Nazi arenas). The stage area was on three levels and extended into and was easily reachable from the audience area; the upper stage area was formed by a building, whose rounded rear wall extended into the field like an apse so that it could also serve as a speaker's tribune for gatherings there. Within this building were the dressing rooms and also in the centre a hall of honor for workers (the erste Ehrenmal der Arbeit, first monument to labour; the arena itself was officially the erste Thingstätte des Reiches, first Thing site of the Reich). (In fact the arena at Heringsdorf was begun first, in early February 1934, and also dedicated that May Day, but the official designation of Thingplatz was withheld from it until later, perhaps so as not to overshadow the Brandberge site.) Financed and built by the German Labour Front, the hall of honour opened onto the assembly field and was intended to symbolise that "art in actuality belongs to the people". It was made of porphyry and contained six larger than life sculptures by Alfred Vocke in rhyolite from Löbejün depicting different kinds of workers: a labourer, a farmer, a researcher, a miner, a smith and an ironworker, and an eternal flame for which a gas line was specially installed. The stage above was also defined by two pillars resembling altars and surmounted by braziers which were ignited during performances. Moshamer's original design, prepared in January 1934, had been for 5,500 seats; this was reduced to 5,050, in the form of benches. Amplification was not installed, but was temporarily added for the first performance, of Kurt Heynicke's Neurode. The slope into which the theatre was built originally had very few trees, but many were planted on both sides to enclose it.

Neurode was presented by a cast of 1,000 to about 6,000 spectators. Later the same month, the summer solstice was celebrated using both the arena and the assembly field, with Joseph Goebbels participating and 225,000 people present. Further use was made of the theatre for drama, beginning in 1935 in association with other open-air theatres in the Gau. However, by that year the Propaganda Ministry was already withdrawing support for Thingspiel performances in Halle as not worth the cost.

Since the Second World War the disused theatre has largely collapsed and been overgrown, although it was made a city monument in 1995. The statues from the workers' hall of honour were removed under the German Democratic Republic and in July 1951 were installed in the Kurt Wabbel Sports Stadium; when this was demolished and rebuilt, the exterior walls were protected as local monuments and the statues currently form part with them of the new Erdgas Sportpark.
