= 1938 in literature =

This article contains information about the literary events and publications of 1938.

== Events ==
- January
  - The John Dos Passos trilogy U.S.A. is published, containing his novels The 42nd Parallel (1930), 1919 (1932), and The Big Money (1936).
  - Samuel Beckett is stabbed in the chest in Paris and nearly killed.
- February 21 – The gay American writer and composer Paul Bowles marries the lesbian American writer Jane Auer at a Reformed Church in Manhattan.
- March 7 – Samuel Beckett's first completed novel Murphy is published in London.
- July 11 – The first live drama adaptation in Orson Welles' The Mercury Theatre on the Air series on CBS Radio in the United States is broadcast: Bram Stoker's Dracula.
- August – Muslims protest in London against passages they see as disrespectful to their religion in H. G. Wells' A Short History of the World (1922).
- September 13 – The first production in Britain of a play by Bertolt Brecht, Mrs Carrar's Rifles, opens at the Unity Theatre, London.
- October 30 – Orson Welles' radio adaptation of The War of the Worlds (with script by Howard Koch) is broadcast in The Mercury Theatre on the Air series.
- December 24 – Jorge Luis Borges is injured in an accident and develops blood poisoning. While recovering during the following year, Borges will write the first short story in his later characteristic style.
- Uncertain dates
  - The first complete performance of both parts of Goethe's Faust (1808/32) is given at the Goetheanum in Dornach, Switzerland.
  - The avant-garde musician and theoretician Pierre Schaeffer begins his writing career as an essayist for a number of French musical journals.

== New books ==
=== Fiction ===
- Margery Allingham – The Fashion in Shrouds
- Eric Ambler
  - Cause for Alarm
  - Epitaph for a Spy
- Vladimir Bartol – Alamut
- Anthony Berkeley – Not to Be Taken
- Elizabeth Bowen – The Death of the Heart
- Dorothy Bowers – Postscript to Poison
- Lynn Brock – The Silver Sickle Case
- Edgar Rice Burroughs – Tarzan and the Forbidden City
- Taylor Caldwell – Dynasty of Death
- Victor Canning – Mr. Finchley Goes to Paris
- John Dickson Carr
  - The Four False Weapons, Being the Return of Bencolin
  - To Wake the Dead
  - The Crooked Hinge
  - The Judas Window (as Carter Dickson)
  - Death in Five Boxes (as Carter Dickson)
- Peter Cheyney
  - Can Ladies Kill?
  - The Urgent Hangman
- Agatha Christie
  - Hercule Poirot's Christmas
  - Appointment with Death
- Albert Cohen – Nailcruncher
- Freeman Wills Crofts
  - Antidote to Venom
  - The End of Andrew Harrison
- J.J. Connington
  - For Murder Will Speak
  - Truth Comes Limping
- René Daumal – A Night of Serious Drinking (La Grande Beuverie)
- Cecil Day-Lewis – The Beast Must Die
- John Dos Passos – The Big Money (completing the U.S.A. trilogy)
- Daphne du Maurier – Rebecca
- Lawrence Durrell – The Black Book
- Mircea Eliade – Marriage in Heaven (Nuntă în cer)
- William Faulkner – The Unvanquished
- Rachel Field – All This and Heaven Too
- C. S. Forester
  - A Ship of the Line
  - Flying Colours
- Anthony Gilbert – Treason in My Breast
- Julien Gracq – The Castle of Argol (Au château d'Argol)
- Robert Graves – Count Belisarius
- Graham Greene – Brighton Rock
- Walter Greenwood
  - Only Mugs Work
  - The Secret Kingdom
- Cyril Hare – Death Is No Sportsman
- Xavier Herbert – Capricornia
- Robin Hyde – The Godwits Fly (semi-autobiographical)
- Michael Innes – Lament for a Maker
- Margaret Kennedy – The Midas Touch
- Alan Kennington – She Died Young
- Emilio Lussu – Un anno sull'altopiano
- C. S. Lewis – Out of the Silent Planet
- Norman Lindsay – Age of Consent
- Ngaio Marsh
  - Artists in Crime
  - Death in a White Tie
- Gladys Mitchell – St Peter's Finger
- Vladimir Nabokov
  - The Gift (Дар)
  - Invitation to a Beheading (Приглашение на казнь; serialization concludes)
- E. Phillips Oppenheim – The Colossus of Arcadia
- Kate O'Brien – Pray for the Wanderer
- John O'Hara – Hope of Heaven
- Ellery Queen
  - The Devil to Pay
  - The Four of Hearts
- Graciliano Ramos – Vidas Secas (Barren Lives)
- Ayn Rand – Anthem
- Marjorie Kinnan Rawlings – The Yearling
- Clayton Rawson – Death from a Top Hat
- Joseph Roth – The Emperor's Tomb
- Jean-Paul Sartre – Nausea (La Nausée)
- Georges Simenon
  - The Man Who Watched the Trains Go By
  - Marie of the Port
- Esphyr Slobodkina – Caps for Sale: A Tale of a Peddler, Some Monkeys and Their Monkey Business
- Eleanor Smith – The Spanish House
- Howard Spring – My Son, My Son
- John Steinbeck – The Long Valley
- Rex Stout – Too Many Cooks
- Cecil Street
  - The Bloody Tower
  - Death at Low Tide
  - Invisible Weapons
- Kressmann Taylor – Address Unknown (short story)
- Phoebe Atwood Taylor
  - The Annulet of Gilt
  - Banbury Bog
  - The Cut Direct (as by Alice Tilton)
  - Murder at the New York World's Fair (as by Freeman Dana)
- B. Traven – The Bridge in the Jungle
- S. S. Van Dine – The Gracie Allen Murder Case
- František Bernard Vaněk – Na krásné samotě
- Henry Wade – Released for Death
- Winifred Watson – Miss Pettigrew Lives for a Day
- Evelyn Waugh – Scoop
- Ethel Lina White – Step in the Dark
- T. H. White – The Sword in the Stone
- Gale Wilhelm – Torchlight to Valhalla
- Francis Brett Young – Dr. Bradley Remembers

=== Children and young people ===
- BB (Denys Watkins-Pitchford) – Wild Lone: The Story of a Pytchley Fox
- Claire Huchet Bishop – The Five Chinese Brothers
- Enid Blyton – The Secret Island
- Eleanor Graham – The Children Who Lived in a Barn
- Joan Kahn – "Ladies and Gentlemen," said the Ringmaster
- Eric Knight – Lassie Come-Home
- Marjorie Kinnan Rawlings – The Yearling
- Kate Seredy – The White Stag
- Noel Streatfeild – The Circus Is Coming
- T. H. White – The Sword in the Stone
- John F. C. Westerman – John Wentley Takes Charge (first in the John Wentley trilogy)
- Ursula Moray Williams – Adventures of the Little Wooden Horse

=== Drama ===
- Jean Anouilh – Thieves' Carnival (Le Bal des Voleurs)
- Robert Ardrey – Casey Jones
- Max Catto – They Walk Alone
- Paul Claudel – L'Histoire de Tobie et de Sara (The History of Tobit and Sara, first version)
- M. J. Farrell – Spring Meeting
- Patrick Hamilton – Gaslight
- H.M. Harwood – The Innocent Party
- Esther McCracken – Quiet Wedding
- Kaj Munk – Han sidder ved Smeltediglen (He sits by the melting pot)
- Michael Pertwee – Death on the Table
- J. B. Priestley – When We Are Married
- Gordon Sherry – The Bare Idea
- Robert E. Sherwood – Abe Lincoln in Illinois
- Dodie Smith – Dear Octopus
- Stephen Spender – Trial of a Judge
- Lesley Storm – Tony Draws a Horse
- Arnold Sundgaard
  - Spirochete: A History
  - with Marc Connelly – Everywhere I Roam
- Rodolfo Usigli – El gesticulador
- Theodore Ward – Big White Fog
- Thornton Wilder – Our Town
- Emlyn Williams – The Corn is Green
- Tennessee Williams – Not About Nightingales (written; first performed 1998)
- W. B. Yeats – Purgatory

=== Poetry ===
- Alfred Kreymborg – The Planets: A Modern Allegory (radio play in verse)
- Mary Pettibone Poole – A Glass Eye at a Keyhole

=== Non-fiction ===
- Crane Brinton – The Anatomy of Revolution
- Hall Caine (died 1931) – Life of Christ
- Cyril Connolly – Enemies of Promise
- Geoffrey Faber – The Romance of a Bookshop 1904–1938
- Robert Newton Flew – Jesus and His Church. A study of the idea of the Ecclesia in the New Testament
- Edgar Innes Fripp (died 1931) – Shakespeare, Man and Artist
- Elie Halévy – The Era of Tyrannies
- Johan Huizinga – Homo Ludens
- Agnes Hunt – This Is My Life (autobiography of pioneer orthopedic nurse)
- C. L. R. James – The Black Jacobins: Toussaint L'Ouverture and the San Domingo Revolution
- Claude Scudamore Jarvis – Desert and Delta. An account of modern Egypt
- Jomo Kenyatta – Facing Mount Kenya
- Anne Morrow Lindbergh – Listen! The Wind
- Robert McAlmon – Being Geniuses Together, 1920–1930
- Thomas Mann – The Coming Victory of Democracy
- George Orwell – Homage to Catalonia
- Nichita Smochină – Republica Moldovenească a Sovietelor (The Moldavian Republic of Soviets)
- Derek A. Traversi – An Approach to Shakespeare
- H. G. Wells – World Brain
- Virginia Woolf – Three Guineas

== Births ==
- January 2 – Hans Herbjørnsrud, Norwegian short story writer (died 2023)
- January 5 – Ngũgĩ wa Thiong'o (also known as James Ngigi), Kenyan novelist (died 2025)
- January 6 – Mario Rodríguez Cobos ("Silo"), Argentine author and spiritualist (died 2010)
- January 13 – Nabaneeta Dev Sen, Indian novelist, children's author and poet (died 2019)
- January 20 – Liz Calder, English publisher and editor
- February 7 – Andrea Newman, English novelist and screenwriter (died 2019)
- February 9 – Jovette Marchessault, French Canadian writer and artist (died 2012)
- February 12
  - Judy Blume, American children's author
  - Tor Obrestad, Norwegian novelist, poet and documentary writer (died 2020)
- February 22 – Ishmael Reed, American poet, essayist and novelist
- March 1 – Michael Kurland, American author of sci-fi and detective fiction
- March 14 – Eleanor Bron, English humorous writer and actress
- March 24 – Ian Hamilton, English critic, biographer and poet (died 2001)
- March 27 – Hansjörg Schneider, Swiss novelist (died 2016)
- April 20 – Chiung Yao, Taiwanese romance novelist (died 2024)
- April 25 – John Nagenda, Ugandan writer and sportsman (died 2023)
- April 30 – Larry Niven, American sci-fi author
- May 13 – Norma Klein, American author (died 1989)
- May 15 – Nancy Garden, American author (died 2014)
- May 16 – Marco Aurelio Denegri, Peruvian literature critic, television host and sexologist (died 2018)
- May 25
  - Raymond Carver, American short-story writer and poet (died 1988)
  - Margaret Forster, English novelist and biographer (died 2016)
- May 26 – Lyudmila Petrushevskaya, Russian novelist and playwright
- June 5
  - Allan Ahlberg, English children's author (died 2025)
  - M. K. Wren (Martha Kay Renfroe), American novelist (died 2016)
- June 16 – Joyce Carol Oates, American novelist
- June 24 – Lawrence Block, American crime fiction writer
- June 26 – Maria Velho da Costa, Portuguese writer (died 2020)
- July 15 – Josephine Cox, English novelist (died 2020)
- July 19
  - Nicholas Bethell, English historian and politician (died 2007)
  - Dom Moraes, Indian poet and columnist (died 2004)
  - Tom Raworth, English poet (died 2017)
  - Mary-Kay Wilmers, American-born editor
- July 28 – Robert Hughes, Australian critic and historian (died 2012)
- August 15 – Janusz Zajdel, Polish writer (died 1985)
- August 21 – Mudrooroo (Colin Johnson), Australian novelist (died 2019)
- August 25 – Frederick Forsyth, English thriller writer (died 2025)
- August 30 – Dorota Terakowska, Polish writer and journalist, author of fantasy books for children and young adults (died 2004)
- September 3 – Caryl Churchill, English dramatist
- September 12 – Richard Booth, Welsh bookseller (died 2019)
- September 15 – Charles L. Mee, American dramatist
- September 18 – Poornachandra Tejaswi, Kannada writer (died 2007)
- September 19 – Keorapetse Kgositsile, South African Poet Laureate (died 2018)
- October 12 – Anne Perry (Juliet Marion Hulme), English historical novelist (died 2023)
- October 13 – Hugo Young, English journalist (died 2003)
- October 16 – Allan Massie, Singapore-born Scottish writer (died 2026)
- October 17 – Les Murray, Australian poet (died 2019)
- November 3 – Terrence McNally, American playwright (died 2020)
- November 4 – Daniel Snowman, English non-fiction writer and historian
- December 14 – Leonardo Boff (Genézio Darci Boff), Brazilian philosopher and theologian
- December 21 – Frank Moorhouse, Australian journalist, author and screenwriter (died 2022)
- December 31 – Basudeb Dasgupta, Bengali novelist (died 2005)
- unknown date – Gabriel Ruhumbika, Tanzanian novelist

== Deaths ==
- January 4 – Paola Drigo, Italian writer (born 1876)
- January 16 – Sarat Chandra Chattopadhyay (Sarat Chandra Chattergee), Bengali novelist (born 1876)
- January 19 – Branislav Nušić, Serbian novelist and dramatist (born 1864)
- January 29 – Armando Palacio Valdés, Spanish novelist and critic (born 1853)
- February 13 – Momčilo Nastasijević, Serbian poet, novelist and dramatist (born 1894)
- March 6 – Eva Allen Alberti, American dramatics teacher (born 1856)
- March 27 – Helen M. Winslow, American editor, author and publisher (born 1851)
- March 31 – Willem Kloos, Dutch poet and critic (born 1859)
- April 19 – Sir Henry Newbolt, English poet (born 1862)
- April 21 – Lady Ottoline Morrell, English literary hostess (born 1873)
- May 26 – James Forbes, Canadian American dramatist and screenwriter (born 1871)
- June 9 – Ovid Densusianu, Romanian poet, philologist and literary historian (born 1873)
- June 26
  - James Weldon Johnson, American politician, poet and activist (born 1871)
  - E. V. Lucas, English essayist and biographer (born 1868)
- July 21 – Owen Wister, American Western fiction writer and historian (born 1860)
- August 7 – Konstantin Stanislavski, Russian theatre director (born 1863)
- August 26 – Millosh Gjergj Nikolla, Albanian poet and writer (tuberculosis, born 1911)
- September 15 – Thomas Wolfe, American novelist (tuberculosis, born 1900)
- October 3 – Olivia Shakespear, British novelist, playwright and patron of the arts (born 1863)
- October 27 – Lascelles Abercrombie, English poet and literary critic (born 1881)
- December 13 – Virginia Frazer Boyle, American author and poet (born 1863)
- December 23 – Robert Herrick, American realist novelist (born 1868)
- December 25 – Karel Čapek, Czech science fiction author and dramatist (pneumonia, born 1890)
- December 27 – Osip Mandelstam, Russian poet and essayist (in detention, born 1891)

== Awards ==
- Carnegie Medal for children's literature: Noel Streatfeild, The Circus Is Coming
- Hawthornden Prize – David Jones, In Parenthesis
- James Tait Black Memorial Prize for fiction: C. S. Forester, A Ship of the Line and Flying Colours
- James Tait Black Memorial Prize for biography: Sir Edmund Chambers, Samuel Taylor Coleridge
- Newbery Medal for children's literature: Kate Seredy, The White Stag
- Newdigate prize: Michael Thwaites
- Nobel Prize in Literature: Pearl S. Buck
- Pulitzer Prize for Drama: Thornton Wilder, Our Town
- Pulitzer Prize for Poetry: Marya Zaturenska, Cold Morning Sky
- Pulitzer Prize for the Novel: John Phillips Marquand, The Late George Apley
