= The Men Who Explained Miracles =

1963 short story collection by John Dickson Carr

- First UK edition
- Author: John Dickson Carr
- Cover artist: B. S. Biro
- Language: English
- Series: Henry Merrivale, Gideon Fell, Colonel March
- Genre: Mystery, detective novel, short story
- Publisher: Hamish Hamilton (UK) & Harper (US, 1964)
- Publication date: 1963
- Publication place: United Kingdom
- Media type: Print (hardback & paperback)
- Pages: 192 pp (1st UK)

The Men Who Explained Miracles, first published in 1963, is a volume of short stories written by John Dickson Carr; the stories feature his series detectives Gideon Fell, Henry Merrivale and Colonel March, of the "Department of Queer Complaints". The stories are mostly reprints of stories previously published in magazines.

== Stories ==
- Colonel March, of the Department of Queer Complaints:
  - "William Wilson's Racket"
  - "The Empty Flat"
- Dr. Gideon Fell:
  - "The Incautious Burglar" (a shortened and altered version of Death and the Gilded Man)
  - "Invisible Hands"
- Two non-series "Secret Service" stories
  - "Strictly Diplomatic"
  - "The Black Cabinet"; this is a story in which an attempt to assassinate Napoleon III is foiled by a contemporaneous historical figure from another context.
- Sir Henry Merrivale:
  - "All in a Maze"
