= Dr. Fell, Detective, and Other Stories =

- First edition
- Author: John Dickson Carr
- Language: English
- Series: Gideon Fell
- Genre: Mystery, detective novel, short story
- Publisher: Mercury Mystery paperback, New York City
- Publication date: 1947
- Publication place: United Kingdom
- Preceded by: The Sleeping Sphinx
- Followed by: The Skeleton in the Clock

Dr. Fell, Detective, and Other Stories, is a mystery short story collection written by John Dickson Carr and first published in the US by Lawrence E. Spivak (The American Mercury) in 1947.

Most of the stories feature his series detective Gideon Fell.

== Stories and first publications ==
Dr. Gideon Fell:

- The Proverbial Murder: first published in Ellery Queen's Mystery Magazine in July 1943, as "The Proverbial Murderer".
- The Locked Room: first published in Strand Magazine in July 1940.
- The Wrong Problem
- The Hangman Won't Wait
- A Guest in the House (a shortened and altered version of Death and the Gilded Man)

Others:

- The Devil in the Summer House
- Will You Walk Into My Parlor?
- Strictly Diplomatic
