= The Burning Court =

1937 novel by John Dickson Carr

- First US edition cover
- Author: John Dickson Carr
- Language: English
- Genre: Mystery, detective, horror
- Publisher: Harper (US); Hamish Hamilton (UK)
- Publication date: 1937
- Publication place: United States
- Media type: Print (hardback & paperback)
- Pages: 209
- OCLC: 13038871

The Burning Court (1937) is a famous locked room mystery by John Dickson Carr. However, it contains neither Gideon Fell nor Henry Merrivale, Carr's two major detectives. It was published in the United States, and was highly controversial upon its first printing, due to its unorthodox ending. Today, it is hailed as Carr's best non-series novel.

== Plot summary ==
Edward Stevens, an editor at Herald and Son's publishing house, is on the train home, recounting the story of the death of the rich uncle of his neighbor, Mark Despard. Uncle Miles had succumbed to gastroenteritis, which had left him bedridden for days. Although this was considered death from natural causes, two strange things were reported surrounding it. A housemaid had spied into Miles's room, around the shade of one of the glass doors leading in, and reported that a woman had been visiting him, who left through a door that had been bricked up for years. And after he died, under his pillow was found a strange piece of string, tied in nine knots, a witch's ladder.

Stevens shrugs both events off. Instead, he opens the book he is bringing home to edit. The book, by noted true crimes author Gaudan Cross, is on murders by poison, and it begins with the trial and execution of Marie d'Aubray in 1861. There is a daguerréotype of her attached to the chapter, which causes Stevens to gasp. The antique photograph is an exact image of his wife, Marie Stevens.

Once home, Stevens confronts Marie, who tries to convince him that the picture means nothing. Stevens leaves to wash his hands, and when he returns, the picture is gone. Then the doorbell rings. It is Mark Despard and a doctor named Partington. Mark explains that he believes his uncle was murdered, and that he, Partington, and Stevens are going to dig up the body and perform an autopsy.

Miles Despard had been buried in a crypt, sealed with cement. The three men begin the long process of breaking up the cement. That done, they descend the long staircase to retrieve the body. They find Miles's coffin, open it, and reveal nothing. A quick search confirms that the body has disappeared from the sealed crypt.

Later events deepen the mystery. A book of witchcraft is discovered in Miles's room, and a handyman reports seeing Miles waving to him from a rocking chair. Morphine tablets disappear, and the mysterious woman visitor to Miles's room is described as dressed like a long-dead woman poisoner. Nearly every member of the Despard and Stevens households comes under suspicion.

== Literary significance and criticism ==
"A stunning situation to start with, which leads to steadily more complicated problems -- all perfectly clear, thanks to the art of this master of plotting ... we are also given a rationally possible explanation of the events, but the odor of brimstone overcomes the factual sense and renders the story a hybrid."

Boucher and McComas praised the novel as the "finest of all fusions of deductive puzzle and supernatural horror."

== Adaptations ==
A 30-minute radio dramatization of the novel was broadcast by CBS on June 17, 1942 and again on June 14, 1945 as part of the series Suspense. A French-Italian-German film of the same name (directed by Julien Duvivier and written by Charles Spaak) was released in 1962.

A 6-part radio dramatization was broadcast by NRK Radioteatret in late 1975 with the title Sort messe.

A 3-part TV dramatization was broadcast by RAI in summer 1979, with the title La dama dei veleni.
