= The Bowstring Murders =

1933 novel by John Dickson Carr

- First edition (US)
- Author: John Dickson Carr writing as "Carr Dickson"
- Language: English
- Genre: Mystery fiction, detective fiction
- Publisher: Morrow (US 1st edition, 1933); Heinemann (UK, 1934)
- Publication date: 1933
- Publication place: United Kingdom
- Media type: Print (hardback & paperback)
- Pages: 280 (1st US)
- ISBN: 0-8217-2687-0 (Zebra paperback edition, 1989)
- OCLC: 19837937
- Preceded by: None, as Carr Dickson
- Followed by: None, as Carr Dickson

The Bowstring Murders is a whodunit mystery novel by the American writer John Dickson Carr (1906–1977), who wrote it under the name of Carr Dickson.

The Bowstring Murders is the only one of his many works to be published under the name Carr Dickson. The name was chosen by the publisher; Carr himself wanted to use the name 'Nicholas Wood', based on his father's first two names. Subsequent reprints have been under his main pseudonym of "Carter Dickson".

It is also his only novel featuring the alcoholic detective John Gaunt. However, another character, Dr Michael Tairlaine, reappears later in The Red Widow Murders.

== Plot summary ==
Elderly eccentric Lord Rayle has a priceless collection of medieval arms and armour housed at Bowstring Castle. When he is found strangled by one of his own bowstrings, it is up to alcoholic detective John Gaunt to solve the crime.
