= The Emperor's Snuff-Box =

1942 mystery novel by John Dickson Carr

- First edition (US)
- Author: John Dickson Carr
- Language: English
- Genre: Mystery, detective novel
- Publisher: Harper (US); Hamish Hamilton (UK)
- Publication date: 1942 (US), 1943 (UK)
- Publication place: United Kingdom
- Media type: Print (hardback & paperback)

The Emperor's Snuff-Box is an American 1942 mystery novel by novelist John Dickson Carr. The detective is psychologist Dr. Dermot Kinross.

The novel takes place in France and concerns a jeweled snuff-box in the shape of a pocket watch said to have belonged to Napoleon. A pretty young Englishwoman living in France forms a romantic attachment and becomes a suspect in the murder of her fiancé's father; the theft of a valuable necklace and the smashing of the snuff-box are also mysteries to be solved. The novel served as the basis for the 1957 film That Woman Opposite, for which Compton Bennett wrote the screenplay.

It is considered one of Carr's great novels and is considered the best among the best mystery plots with no locked room murders, impossible crimes, or supernatural elements.
