= The Haverfordian =

Haverford College literary magazine from 1879 to 1940

- Categories: Literary magazine
- Frequency: monthly until 1938, then semi-annually
- Publisher: Westbrook Publishing Co., then Haverford College from 1938
- Founded: 1879
- Final issue: 1940; 86 years ago
- Country: United States
- Language: English

The Haverfordian was a literary magazine published by Haverford College from 1879 to 1940. From its founding until 1900, when a paper called The Weekly was established, The Haverfordian was Haverford's sole college paper.

== History ==
In 1879, Haverford's three literary societies got together and decided to launch the college's first literary magazine; they christened it The Haverfordian. The magazine included poems, essays, short stories, and book reviews written by Haverford students. Its publication was predominantly funded through subscriptions and the sale of advertisements.

The magazine was published monthly by the student body through June, 1938. In the 1938–1939 academic year, after a vote by the undergraduate board to discontinue publication, it became a semi-annual periodical published by the college. The first semi-annual issue, issued in December 1938, included a letter entitled "Explanatory" from the college president, William Wistar Comfort; it read as follows:

For some years The Haverfordian has had a somewhat precarious existence and the recent editors feel that there is not sufficient literary activity among the undergraduates to warrant the continuation of this ancient monthly at the present time. It is likely that it will be revived by the undergraduates when and if circumstances become more favorable.

It is, however, undesirable that a publication which has reflected in a measure the life of the College for over half a century should completely lapse. It is desirable that the name at least should be perpetuated, so that publication of the undergraduate monthly might be easily resumed at a later date without any break in the series.

After the transfer of control, a new committee for publication was created; led by William A. Reitzel, one of the college's English professors, the committee also included Comfort and a former secretary of the college alumni. Contributions came from "alumni, faculty, college administration and undergraduates" as The Haverfordian became what Comfort called, "a means of communicating with the Alumni."

The last issue of The Haverfordian was volume LIX, number 2, published in May, 1940.

== Contributors ==
Noted contributors to The Haverfordian included: opera singer David Bispham, chemist Theodore William Richards, U. Penn law school dean William Draper Lewis, philosopher Warner Fite, painter and illustrator Maxfield Parrish, and mystery writer John Dickson Carr who first introduced his fictional French detective, Henri Bencolin, in the magazine.
