= Poison in Jest =

1932 novel by John Dickson Carr

Poison In Jest
- First US edition
- Author: John Dickson Carr
- Language: English
- Genre: Mystery, detective novel
- Publisher: Hamish Hamilton (UK) & Harper (US)
- Publication date: 1932
- Publication place: United Kingdom
- Media type: Print (hardback & paperback)
- Pages: 192 pp (1st UK)

Poison In Jest, first published in 1932, is a detective story by John Dickson Carr which does not feature any of Carr's series detectives. This novel is a mystery of the type known as a whodunnit. One of the characters is Jeff Marle, who had previously served as the sidekick in Carr's Henri Bencolin novels.

== Title ==
The title page quotes from Hamlet, act III, scene 2:

King: Have you heard the argument? Is there no offence in't?
Hamlet: No, no! They do but jest, poison in jest; no offence i' the world.

== Plot summary ==
Jeff Marle, is visiting a friend at the Quayle mansion in western Pennsylvania. Although various members of the Quayle household hate each other, all are united in hatred of the paterfamilias, Judge Quayle. A few moments after being introduced to Marle, Judge Quayle collapses after having been poisoned. More than one poison is used in murder attempts in the household; strange shadowy figures are seen prowling the halls at night, and there is a creepy story about a marble hand that was broken from a statue of Caligula which apparently creeps around the house on its own. After the first two deaths, a young friend of the family, Rossiter, takes a hand in detecting, with the aid of Jeff Marle; Rossiter identifies the murderer.
