= Colonel March Investigates =

1953 British film by Cy Endfield

- Directed by: Cy Endfield
- Screenplay by: Leo Davis
- Based on: The Department of Queer Complaints by Carter Dickson
- Produced by: Donald Ginsberg
- Starring: Boris Karloff
- Edited by: Stanley Willis
- Music by: John Lanchbery
- Release date: 1 July 1953
- Running time: 70 minutes
- Country: UK
- Language: English

Colonel March Investigates is a 1953 British film directed by Cy Endfield. The film comprises the three pilot episodes of the TV series Colonel March of Scotland Yard that were filmed in 1952, starring Boris Karloff. These episodes were "Hot Money", "Death in the Dressing Room" and "The New Invisible Man". all adaptations of stories from the Department of Queer Complaints collection by John Dickson Carr (writing as Carter Dickson). The screenplay was credited to "Leo Davis", disguising the involvement of blacklisted screenwriters Abraham Polonsky and Walter Bernstein.

The Colonel March TV series premiered first in the United States from Dec. 1954 to Spring of 1955, with a total of 26 episodes. It was broadcast on television in England in 1955 on Associated Television (ITV London, weekends), on 26 consecutive Saturday evenings from September 24, 1955 until March 17, 1956.

== Plot ==
Colonel March, Head of the Department of Queer Complaints at Scotland Yard, is an investigator of unusual criminal cases and activities. The film sees him solve a bank robbery, for which an innocent man was framed, and two murders involving complex tricks and disguises.

== Cast ==
- Boris Karloff as Colonel March
- Ewan Roberts as Ames
- Richard Wattis as Cabot
- John Hewer as John Parrish
- Sheila Burrell as Joan Forsythe
- Anthony Forwood as Jim Hartley
- Patricia Owens as Betty Hartley
- Ronald Leigh-Hunt as Mr. Bowlder
- Joan Sims as Marjorie Dawson

== Production ==
Boris Karloff and his wife Evelyn sailed to England in July, 1952, where Karloff filmed three different pilot episodes of the Colonel March series to show to British TV executives. In 1953, when the show was green lighted, Karloff returned to England to film 23 more episodes, making a total of 26 in all, then returned to Hollywood to film Abbott and Costello Meet Dr. Jekyll and Mr. Hyde (1953). The three pilots were later compiled into the 1953 feature film called Colonel March Investigates (aka Colonel March of Scotland Yard), so that they could be shown theatrically. Karloff filmed bits of onscreen narration to help unite the three stories and these scenes are exclusive to the compilation film only.

== Music ==
The music of Colonel March Investigates and its related TV series Colonel March of Scotland Yard features contributions from several composers: the 1953 film compilation was scored by John Lanchbery, while the TV series is best known for its jaunty, martial yet playful theme by Edwin Astley, used in most of the 26 episodes, with Philip Green providing music for at least one episode. The Astley theme, often associated with the show’s opening sequence and its “mystery object” introductions, set the program’s light but suspenseful tone, though some episodes used alternate or more fast-paced music for variation, making the soundtrack a distinctive part of Colonel March’s quirky mystery appeal.

== Critical reception ==
The Monthly Film Bulletin wrote: "These three 'gimmicky' little stories have the appearance of being aimed as much at television as at the cinema market. The tricks on which they principally rely are likely to become obvious to the audience rather before the solutions are propounded by Boris Karloff, an old-style mystery man with black eye-patch, sword-stick umbrella and unremittingly suave manner. Cyril Endfield, director of The Sound of Fury, brings a certain slickness to the commonplace material, notably in the first story."

Kine Weekly wrote: "None of the tales is particularly exciting or thrilling, but Boris Karloff, shrewdly cast in the lead, adequately preserves continuity and furnishes essential colour. ... but its subjects, although adequately acted and generously staged, are wildly extravagant and bulk presentation stresses their theatricality. Yet, despite its shortcomings, the show as a whole is not entirely lacking in variety or surprise and these qualities, strengthened by the resourceful teamwork of Boris Karloff and Ewan Roberts, as Ames, should just get its disconnected jottings over with the hoi polloi."

TV Guide wrote, "the scripts are nothing special, but Karloff is a joy to watch, as usual."
