= Cabin B-13 =

Cabin B-13 is the title of both a radio play by John Dickson Carr broadcast in the United Kingdom and United States, and an old-time radio mystery anthology series by Carr, broadcast in the United States only.

== Radio Play ==
Diana Powell, in 100 American Crime Writers, wrote:

Cabin B-13 is the harrowing tale of a new bride who boards an ocean liner for her honeymoon only to find out the groom has disappeared and that the ship's crew doubt his existence and her sanity. Her fear over her groom's whereabouts is heightened by a threat to her inherited wealth and the stress of not being believed.

Cabin B-13 was first broadcast on the American radio program Suspense on March 16, 1943, with Ralph Bellamy starring. It was broadcast again on Suspense on November 9, 1943, this time co-starring Margo and Philip Dorn. The trade publication Radio Daily reported in its December 26, 1948, issue that the play would "have its third airing over CBS Saturday, December 27" — as a standalone program rather than being broadcast as an episode of Suspense. Additionally, the article noted, "Screen executives on the West Coast will hear Cabin B-13 in a special rebroadcast over KNX, Hollywood, Saturday, January 3, 4:00-4:30 p.m. in order to weigh its screen possibilities."

On September 11, 1943, Cabin B-13 was used for the premiere of the British Broadcasting Corporation program Appointment with Fear. Richard J. Hand, in his book Listen in terror: British horror radio from the advent of broadcasting to the digital age, wrote, "Carr deliberately chose Cabin B-13 [for the first episode] as he felt it was his best Suspense play and would be an effective opening for this British series in the American style."

=== Other media ===
The script was published in the May 1944 issue of Ellery Queen's Mystery Magazine. The 1953 film Dangerous Crossing was based on Cabin B-13, as was the 1992 made-for-television movie Treacherous Crossing. As for TV series, the play was presented on Suspense, and on June 26, 1958, it was the last story aired on Climax!. In 1959, it was presented as an episode of The Unforeseen on Canada's CBC Television.

== Radio Series ==
Cabin B-13
- Genre: Mystery anthology
- Running time: 30 minutes
- Country of origin: United States
- Language: English
- Syndicates: CBS
- Starring: Arnold Moss; Alan Hewitt
- Created by: John Dickson Carr
- Written by: John Dickson Carr
- Directed by: John Dietz
- Original release: July 5, 1948 – January 2, 1949

The Cabin B-13 radio program was broadcast on CBS July 5, 1948 - January 2, 1949. It went on the air as a replacement for Arthur Godfrey's Talent Scouts and was replaced by It Pays to Be Ignorant. The program initially was on at 8:30 p.m. Eastern Time on Mondays; in late September 1948, it was moved to 10 p.m. E.T. on Tuesdays.

=== Format ===
Cabin B-13 comprised stories told by Dr. John Fabian, surgeon on the luxury liner Maurevania while it was docked somewhere in the world. Vincent Terrace, in Radio Programs, 1924-1984: A Catalog of More Than 1800 Shows, described Fabian as "a man who has traveled many thousands of miles and has seen many things." He kept a journal of his experiences and related a different story, sometimes of mystery and sometimes of adventure - to listeners each episode.

=== Personnel ===
Arnold Moss played Dr. Fabian, the program's storyteller, except for four episodes in which Alan Hewitt had that role. John Dietz was the director, and Merle Kendrick (episodes 1-11) and Alfredo Antonioni (episodes 12-23) provided the music.

=== Critical response ===
A review of the premiere episode in the trade publication Variety said, "Suspenseful pace is maintained throughout, with story turns sufficiently intriguing to hold interest." The review complimented Carr's tight script and Dietz's suspenseful directing.
