= The Devil in Velvet =

1951 mystery novel by John Dickson Carr

- First edition (US)
- Author: John Dickson Carr
- Language: English
- Genre: Mystery, detective fiction, historical fiction
- Publisher: Hamish Hamilton (UK) & Harper (USA)
- Publication date: 1951
- Publication place: United Kingdom
- Media type: Print (hardback & paperback)
- Pages: 335 (1st US)
- ISBN: 0-88184-328-8 (Carroll & Graf paperback edition, 1987)
- OCLC: 16415074

The Devil in Velvet, first published in 1951, is a detective story by American writer John Dickson Carr. This novel is both a mystery and a historical novel, with elements of the supernatural.

== Plot summary ==
Cambridge Professor of history Nicholas Fenton, in the England of 1925, makes a bargain with the devil and is sent back in time to Restoration London in 1675 to solve a murder that is about to take place, in the body of Sir Nick Fenton. Fenton soon finds himself in love with the intended victim, Sir Nick's wife Lydia, and resolves to alter the course of history by preventing her murder. Fenton's mastery of 20th century swordsmanship makes him a fearsome antagonist in 1675, so much so that he becomes known as "the devil in velvet". Also involved in the action is a woman who has also sold her soul to the devil and travelled back in time, and Fenton finds himself torn between the two women. He must not only solve the approaching murder before it happens, but come to terms with Sir Nick's romantic and political entanglements—and even void his deal with the devil.

== Reception ==
Boucher and McComas lauded The Devil In Velvet as an "unbelievably perfect fusion of time travel and diabolism with historical romance and pure detection," listing it among the best imaginative novels of 1951.

== 1952 television adaptation ==
"The Devil in Velvet"
- Studio One episode
- Episode no.: Season 4 Episode 17
- Directed by: Paul Nickell
- Written by: Sumner Locke Elliott
- Original air date: January 7, 1952
- Running time: 60 mins

The novel was adapted for television in 1952 as an episode of Studio One.

The adaptation was done by Sumner Locke Elliott and the cast included Whit Bissell and Phyllis Kirk.
