= Colonel March =

Fictional detective

Colonel March is a fictional detective created by American writer John Dickson Carr. He appeared in a number of short stories written in the 1930s and 1940s of "impossible crime" mysteries. He was an official attached to Scotland Yard in the so-called Department of Queer Complaints.

Carr based March on Major John Street, MC, OBE with whom he had co-written the novel Drop to His Death.

Colonel March was portrayed by Boris Karloff in the 1950s British TV series, Colonel March of Scotland Yard.
