= Murder in the Submarine Zone =

1940 novel by John Dickson Carr

Murder in the Submarine Zone (US title: Nine — and Death Makes Ten, also published as Murder in the Atlantic)
- First US edition
- Author: John Dickson Carr writing as "Carter Dickson"
- Language: English
- Series: Henry Merrivale
- Genre: Mystery fiction, detective fiction
- Publisher: Morrow (US, 1940); Heinemann (UK, 1940)
- Publication date: 1940
- Publication place: United Kingdom
- Media type: Print (hardback & paperback)
- Preceded by: And So To Murder
- Followed by: Seeing is Believing

Murder in the Submarine Zone (also published as Nine—And Death Makes Ten and Murder in the Atlantic) is a mystery novel by the American writer John Dickson Carr, who published it under the name of Carter Dickson. It is a whodunnit and features the series detective Sir Henry Merrivale.

== Plot summary ==
Nine oddly-assorted passengers aboard the S.S. Edwardic are crossing the Atlantic during World War II, with the constant threat of attack by German submarines. When one passenger is murdered, apparently for a military secret, Sir Henry Merrivale must solve the mystery. But can he contend with the fact that the killer's fingerprint doesn't match anybody on the ship?

== Literary significance and criticism ==
According to Jacques Barzun and Wendell Hertig Taylor, the novel is "One of the author's most straightforward stories. The action ... consists in finding out who murdered whom for a military secret — except that the motive takes an unexpected turn. The several characters are well differentiated and suspicion fairly distributed. Shipboard life in the blackout is especially well done."
