= The Witch of the Low Tide =

1961 mystery novel by John Dickson Carr

- First edition (US)
- Author: John Dickson Carr
- Language: English
- Genre: Mystery, detective novel, historical novel
- Publisher: Hamish Hamilton (UK) & Harper (USA)
- Publication date: 1961
- Publication place: United Kingdom
- Media type: Print (hardback & paperback)
- Pages: 186 pp (Bantam #H3639, paperback edition, 1964)

The Witch of the Low Tide, first published in 1961, is a detective story/historical novel by John Dickson Carr set in the England of 1907. The novel is both a murder mystery and a historical novel.

== Plot summary ==
David Garth, M.D., has fallen in love with the beautiful widow, Lady Betty Calder.

Detective-Inspector Twigg of Scotland Yard tries to warn Dr. Garth about the chequered past of Lady Calder, but it takes all the nerve of Garth's friend, Cullingford Abbot, assistant to the Commissioner of Scotland Yard, to state that, among other things, Betty danced for three seasons at the Moulin Rouge and is thought to have joined a Satanist group in Paris. She is also reputed to be a blackmailer responsible for at least two suicides.

However, Betty herself raises the possibility that she is being mistaken for the machinations of her sister Glynis.

When Glynis is found dead on the beach near a bathing-pavilion, in the middle of a stretch of unmarked sand, Betty is suspected of arranging the death (although no one can suggest how it might have happened).

It takes Dr. Garth's special knowledge of both medicine (the new science of "psychoanalysis", which suggests that abuse of a child may be the fault of the child and that the abuser may be innocent) and literature, like Gaston Leroux's The Mystery of the Yellow Room, to solve the impossible crime and reveal the criminal.
