= Seeing Is Believing (novel) =

Novel by John Dickson Carr

Seeing is Believing (also published as Cross of Murder)
- First edition (US)
- Author: John Dickson Carr writing as "Carter Dickson"
- Language: English
- Series: Henry Merrivale
- Genre: Mystery fiction, detective fiction
- Publisher: Morrow (US, 1941); Heinemann (UK, 1942)
- Publication date: 1941
- Publication place: United Kingdom
- Media type: Print (hardback & paperback)
- Pages: 272
- Preceded by: Murder in the Submarine Zone
- Followed by: The Gilded Man

Seeing is Believing (also published as Cross of Murder) is a mystery novel by the American writer John Dickson Carr, who published it under the name of Carter Dickson. It is a whodunnit and features the series detective Sir Henry Merrivale and his associate, Scotland Yard's Chief Inspector Humphrey Masters. The novel was originally published in 1941.

== Plot summary ==
Arthur Fane arranges an unusual entertainment for his uncle, a long-term guest, and a few other witnesses—he hires Dr. Rich to hypnotise his wife Victoria. The guests, but not Victoria, have been shown that a gun in the room is actually harmless; everyone, including Victoria, is aware that a dagger provided is made of rubber. The hypnotised Victoria is invited to shoot her husband, and refuses; when told to stab him, though, she agrees. Unfortunately, someone has substituted a real dagger for the rubber one, even though everyone in the room agrees that it would have been impossible to make the substitution.

Although Sir Henry Merrivale is busily engaged in dictating his scandalous and slanderous memoirs to a ghost writer, he takes a hand to solve the murder with his friend Chief Inspector Masters, and brings things to a head just as another death occurs.
