= It Walks By Night =

1930 novel by John Dickson Carr

- First US edition (publ. Harper Brothers)
- Author: John Dickson Carr
- Series: Henri Bencolin
- Genre: Detective novel
- Published: 1930
- Publisher: Harper & Brothers
- Media type: Print

It Walks By Night, first published in 1930, is the first detective novel by John Dickson Carr. It introduced Carr's series detective Henri Bencolin. This novel is a mystery of the type known as a locked-room mystery. It has been compared to "The Murders in the Rue Morgue" by Edgar Allan Poe.

== Synopsis ==
A closely guarded room in a Paris gambling house, a mangled body on the floor, a severed head staring from the centre of the carpet; someone had entered that room, killed and escaped all within ten minutes.

Ten minutes after the Duc de Saligny entered the card room, the police burst in – and found he had been murdered. Both doors to the card room had been watched yet the murderer had gone in and out without being seen by anyone.

== Reception ==
In a 2019 review in the Times Literary Supplement, Heather O'Donoghue writes that while the setting is "unexpectedly hard-hitting", "the novel itself is not easy reading" and that character development suffers, in part due to the tradition that "the culprit should be the least likely suspect".
