= Fire, Burn! =

Novel by John Dickson Carr

- First edition (publ. Harper & Brothers)
- Author: John Dickson Carr
- Language: English
- Publication date: 1957

Fire, Burn! is a 1957 historical mystery novel by John Dickson Carr. Carr considered this one of his best impossible crime novels.

It centres on John Cheviot, a 1950s Detective Superintendent and head of the Metropolitan Police's C1 Branch who is transported back in time into the body of a man of the same name who joins the force at the time of its formation in 1829. The title is a quotation from Act IV, Scene 1 of William Shakespeare's play Macbeth, which a character in the novel reports Edmund Kean as saying on seeing Margaret Renfrew, the novel's murder victim.

== Plot ==
John Cheviot boards a taxi bound for 1950s New Scotland Yard. When he gets out, he finds himself in the body of a wealthy gentleman of the same name, getting out of a hansom cab at 4 Whitehall Place in the year 1829. He is there to be interviewed by Sir Robert Peel and the first two Commissioners of the new Metropolitan Police, Charles Rowan and Richard Mayne. Just before the interview he meets Lady Flora Drayton, his lover. Though she seems familiar, he cannot fathom why as his memories of his 1950s life are starting to fade. Halfway through the interview, Peel and the Commissioners are told the theft of birdseed at Lady Cork's house, and they send Cheviot to investigate. Their Chief Clerk Alan Henley is sent ahead to take notes for Cheviot.

On arrival, Cheviot sends Flora to question Lady Cork's staff, accidentally insults Captain Hugo Hogben of the 1st Foot Guards, meets Lady Cork's companion Margaret Renfrew, and ascertains that Lady Cork has been hiding her jewels in her bird feeders to try to catch a thief. On leaving Lady Cork's room, Henley and Cheviot witness Renfrew being fatally shot. Flora is also present and - though a miniature pistol belonging to her late husband drops from her muff - there is no bullet hole or smell of gunpowder. Nonetheless Cheviot hides the pistol and conceals its existence from Mayne, who starts to suspect Flora, event though the post-mortem shows that the bullet that killed Renfrew was too big to have come from the miniature pistol, had not been distorted upon firing or impact, and has no traces of gunpowder.

Hogben comes to 4 Whitehall Place to avenge the insult, but Cheviot beats him using judo and breaks his sword, leading Hogben to challenge him to a duel with pistols. Cheviot agrees, so long as they have a shooting competition at Manton's beforehand. He then visits Vulcan's gambling house, where he knows the jewellery stolen by Renfrew has been placed as pledges on her lover's behalf. He suspects Renfrew was about to break with her lover and expose him, for which he killed her. Vulcan attacks Cheviot during a private meeting, but Cheviot knocks him unconscious and lets in a team of police officers to search for the stolen items and Vulcan's ledger, which will give the name of Renfrew's lover. However, Vulcan's lover Kate de Bourke witnesses the fight and reveals the officers' presence to the gamblers via a suicide attempt. Cheviot distracts them by revealing that Vulcan's gaming tables are rigged, and the gamblers turn on the thugs Vulcan had prepared to attack Cheviot.

Cheviot visits Flora early in the morning after the raid, finding her reading The Fatal Effects of Gambling Exemplified in the Murder of Wm. Weare. That book's appendix and his experience practising for the shooting match make him realise that the bullet that killed Renfrew was fired from an air gun, not a firearm. He wins the shooting matchm, then takes Flora to a picnic at Vauxhall Gardens before the duel, due for the evening. However, Hogben's former second for the duel (who has turned against him) and two of Cheviot's loyal police officers arrive to reveal that Hogben has instead gone to Whitehall Place to reveal Cheviot's concealment of Flora's pistol and to 'prove' that Cheviot or Flora was the murderer.

Cheviot arrives in time to interrupt Hogben and reveals that Henley was Renfrew's lover and murderer; he planted the pistol for Flora to find and shot Renfrew with an air gun in his cane on the pretence of pointing at her with it. Realising he will hang for perjuring himself, Hogben flees down Whitehall and shoots Cheviot dead when he pursues. This causes Cheviot to wake up in the 1950s outside New Scotland Yard, where he has a concussion from his taxi colliding with a police car. He is picked up and taken home by his wife, who proves to be one and the same as Flora Drayton from 1829.

== Awards ==
1969 – Grand Prix de Littérature Policière – best foreign novel, tied with The Daughter of Time by Josephine Tey

== Adaptations ==
- 1971: Morte a passo di valzer – Italian TV mini-series
- 1975: BBC produced a radio play adaptation of the novel.
