= The Waxworks Murder =

1932 novel by John Dickson Carr

- First US edition cover
- Author: John Dickson Carr
- Original title: The Corpse in the Waxworks
- Language: English
- Series: Henri Bencolin
- Genre: Mystery, detective novel
- Publisher: Hamish Hamilton (UK) & Harper (USA)
- Publication date: 1932
- Publication place: United Kingdom
- Media type: Print (hardback & paperback)
- Pages: 220 pp (Penguin paperback edition, 1962

The Waxworks Murder, first published in 1932, is a detective story by John Dickson Carr featuring his series detective Henri Bencolin of the Parisian police. This novel is a mystery of the type known as a whodunnit.

== Plot summary ==
The body of a young woman, who has been stabbed in the back, is found floating in the Seine River. The body of another young woman, with a knife in her back, is found in the arms of a wax figure, the "Satyr of the Seine", in a local wax museum. All available clues lead directly to the infamous "Club of the Silver Key", where aristocratic masked club members mix and mingle in the darkened rooms in search of adulterous entertainment. Henri Bencolin and his friend Jeff Marle must penetrate the club and make sense of the few clues, before Bencolin arrives at the solution and makes a very surprising wager with the murderer.
