= The Nine Wrong Answers =

1952 novel by John Dickson Carr

- First edition (UK)
- Author: John Dickson Carr
- Cover artist: Cecil Walter Bacon
- Language: English
- Genre: Mystery, detective novel
- Publisher: Hamish Hamilton (UK) & Harper (US)
- Publication date: 1952
- Publication place: United Kingdom
- Media type: Print (hardback & paperback)
- Pages: 350 pp
- OCLC: 31942743

The Nine Wrong Answers, first published in 1952, is a detective story by John Dickson Carr which does not feature any of his series detectives. It is an expansion of Carr's 1942 radio play "Will You Make A Bet With Death".

This novel is a whodunnit mystery, with an emphasis on the puzzle aspect. The title derives from Carr's atypical use of footnotes to address the reader, remarking on certain interpretations of events, conclusions, or mystery cliches, and telling the reader to discard them, while also urging a very literal interpretation of text. These serve as the "nine wrong answers," while in the denouement, the protagonist reveals the nine correct answers he arrived at in order to solve the mystery.

== Plot summary ==
Bill Dawson is a broke young Brit sitting in the waiting room of a lawyer's office in New York City. He overhears Larry Hurst and his girlfriend Joy Tennant discussing with the lawyer the prospect of Larry becoming sole heir to the large estate of his uncle Gaylord Hurst, providing that Larry returns to England immediately and visits his uncle at least once a week. Larry, however, is convinced that his uncle wants to murder him. Larry and Joy ask Bill to witness Larry's signature, invite him for a drink, and propose that Bill impersonates Larry for six months for the sum of ten thousand dollars. Bill agrees; Larry is almost immediately poisoned. Bill escapes and takes the next flight to England to complete his end of the agreement.

Upon arrival at Gaylord's flat, Bill soon learns that Hurst and his manservant Hatto are both practised sadists whose plans certainly included the psychological torture of Larry; however, Bill is soon found out. Hurst, not to be cheated of prey, offers Bill a bargain; continue to meet once weekly for three months and keep the ten thousand dollars he has already received. Bill agrees, and almost immediately there is an attempt on his life with a clever trap—then another, that lands him in the hospital. Finally, after another death, Bill confronts the villain in a dramatic conclusion that takes place in a reconstruction of the sitting room of Sherlock Holmes and that reveals a very surprising tenth answer to the book's events.

== Reception ==
S. T. Joshi considers it to be "Carr's most formally radical or unconventional mystery" and one of Carr's three best non-series novels, observing that it is a "novel-length conte cruel". Randall Garrett noted that Carr "told the absolute truth — within the framework of the story — and left it to the reader to delude himself". Stephen Sondheim has described Carr's use of footnotes as "a constant, snotty, condescending shaking of the finger", which was "exhilarating", but ultimately concluded that he "was fonder of the notion than of the book ".
