= Death in Five Boxes =

1938 novel by John Dickson Carr

- First edition (UK)
- Author: John Dickson Carr writing as "Carter Dickson"
- Language: English
- Series: Henry Merrivale
- Genre: Mystery, detective
- Publisher: Morrow (US); Heinemann (UK)
- Publication date: 1938
- Publication place: United Kingdom
- Media type: Print (hardback & paperback)
- Pages: 310 (first US edition)
- Preceded by: The Judas Window
- Followed by: Drop to His Death

Death in Five Boxes is a mystery novel by the American writer John Dickson Carr, who published it under the name of Carter Dickson. It is a whodunnit and features the series detective Sir Henry Merrivale and his associate, Scotland Yard's Chief Inspector Humphrey Masters.

== Plot summary ==
Dr. John Sanders, a serious young forensic scientist, is stopped by a pretty young girl late at night. Marcia Blystone asks him to accompany her to the top floor of a four-story building, to the apartment of Mr. Felix Haye, because she is afraid to go up alone.

Before they reach the apartment, he finds an umbrella-swordstick with bloodstains on it, and they are immediately stopped by a clerk from the Anglo-Egyptian Importing Co. Ltd., one floor below Mr. Haye's flat. He mentions grumpily that Haye and his guests have been laughing uproariously and stomping their feet on the floor. When the couple finally enters Haye's flat, they find the host stabbed to death, and his three guests—including Miss Blystone's surgeon father—unconscious due to atropine poisoning.

The couple make their way back to the importing company, where the clerk offers them the telephone and promptly disappears. Upon their recovering consciousness, each of the three guests is questioned about the unusual contents of their pockets. The doctor is carrying four wrist watches; a beautiful dealer in art is carrying a bottle of quicklime and another of phosphorus; and the owner of the Anglo-Egyptian Importing Company is carrying the ringing mechanism of an alarm clock and a convex piece of glass. All three swear that their cocktails were prepared from unopened bottles in the presence of all of them, yet someone has managed to poison them. Chief Inspector Masters brings in Sir Henry Merrivale to investigate the bizarre circumstances.

At the offices of Charles Drake, Haye's lawyer, they find the evidence of five small boxes, all empty. They are each labeled with a name—the three guests, the clerk, and someone named "Judith Adams", who turns out to be a deceased author who wrote a book on legendary dragons.

It takes all Sir Henry's ingenuity to work out the tangle of relationships and motives and reveal not only who stabbed Felix Haye, but also poisoned the cocktails and how—and why Judith Adams is the key to it all.

== Literary significance and criticism ==
According to Jacques Barzun and Wendell Hertig Taylor, "As usual, Carter Dickson's plot is extremely complicated and it depends on a variety of gimmicks, most of which are barely plausible. One good one is the method of poisoning the White Lady cocktails without anybody's going near the shaker or the glasses. For the rest, the dialogue is in the worst style of false excitement and byplay, particularly the part allotted to the egregious Sir Henry Merrivale, who calls everybody "son" and yells "shut up" whenever he is stumped. The early portion is dull, the middle chaotic, and the end interminable."
