= And So to Murder =

1940 novel by John Dickson Carr

- First US edition cover
- Author: John Dickson Carr writing as "Carter Dickson"
- Language: English
- Series: Henry Merrivale
- Genre: Mystery, detective fiction
- Publisher: Morrow (US, 1940, First edition); Heinemann (UK, 1941)
- Publication date: 1940
- Publication place: United Kingdom
- Media type: Print (hardback & paperback)
- Pages: 239 (in Dell mapback #175, 1947)
- Preceded by: The Reader is Warned
- Followed by: Murder in the Submarine Zone

And So to Murder is a mystery novel by the American writer John Dickson Carr, who published it under the name of Carter Dickson. It is a whodunnit and features the series detective Sir Henry Merrivale and Scotland Yard Chief Inspector Humphrey Masters.

== Plot summary ==
The protagonist, Monica Stanton, is the pretty and naive daughter of a British clergyman. As the author of a surprisingly scandalous best-seller, she has been hired as a script writer for Albion Films, working with William Cartwright, another script writer from the world of detective novels.

However, she is not going to be working on her own novel—she is helping Cartwright adapt his latest detective novel, And So to Murder. Tilly Parsons is a dumpy, bustling chain-smoking American woman in her early fifties who is the highest-paid scenario writer in the world, imported from Hollywood at great expense to adapt "punch up" the screenplay of another Albion film.

Frances Fleur, pictured as a glamorous movie star, whose punctilious husband Kurt von Gagern selects all her parts, will be the star. Against the backdrop of Pineham Studios and Fleur's current movie, a series of mysterious attempts on Monica's life begin—they are exceptionally nasty and completely inexplicable, involving sulphuric acid.

When someone poisons Tilly Parsons' cigarette and nearly kills her, Sir Henry Merrivale helps Chief Inspector Masters to bring home the crimes to their perpetrator.
