= The Unicorn Murders =

1935 novel by John Dickson Carr

- First edition (US)
- Author: John Dickson Carr writing as "Carter Dickson"
- Language: English
- Series: Henry Merrivale
- Genre: Mystery fiction Detective fiction
- Publisher: Morrow (US, 1935); Heinemann (UK, 1936)
- Publication date: 1935
- Publication place: United Kingdom
- Media type: Print (hardback & paperback)
- Pages: 240 (Dell mapback #16, 1940)
- Preceded by: The Red Widow Murders
- Followed by: The Punch and Judy Murders

The Unicorn Murders is a mystery novel by the American writer John Dickson Carr (1906–1977), who published it under the name of Carter Dickson. It is a locked room mystery (more precisely, it is a subset of that group, an impossible mystery) and features his series detective, Sir Henry Merrivale.

== Plot summary ==
Kenwood Blake formerly with the British Secret Service meets - by chance - another agent, Evelyn Cheyne, in Paris. Following instructions, they drive to a place near Orleans, unbeknownst followed by Sir Henry Merrivale. Blake, Cheyne and Merrivale observe how an airplane makes an emergency landing near the Château de l'Ile, and an assorted group of strangers and Sir Ramsden, also a British agent, disembark from the airplane. Together they go to the Château, where the Comte d'Andrieu is apparently expecting visitors and offers them all his hospitality. Merrivale will become embroiled in a battle between Flamande, the most picturesque criminal in France, and his arch-enemy Gaston Gasquet of the Sûreté. Both Flamande and Gasquet are masters of disguise, and no one knows what either man looks like.

In the castle, one of the plane's passengers falls to the ground with a hole in his forehead, as if he had been gored by a unicorn, and the area where he fell was under observation by impartial witnesses such that it seems impossible for anyone to have committed the murder.

Sir Henry must sort out the twin problems of who's really who and whodunnit.
