= The Ten Teacups =

1937 novel by John Dickson Carr

- First US edition
- Author: John Dickson Carr
- Language: English
- Series: Henry Merrivale
- Genre: Mystery fiction, detective fiction
- Publisher: Morrow (US); Heinemann (UK)
- Publication date: 1937
- Publication place: United Kingdom
- Media type: Print (hardback & paperback)
- OCLC: 17361404
- Preceded by: The Punch and Judy Murders
- Followed by: The Judas Window

The Ten Teacups (U.S. title: The Peacock Feather Murders), is a locked room mystery by American mystery writer John Dickson Carr, writing as Carter Dickson. It features the series detective Sir Henry Merrivale, working with Scotland Yard's Chief Inspector Humphrey Masters.

In a poll of 17 mystery writers and reviewers, this novel was voted as the tenth best locked room mystery of all time. The Hollow Man also by John Dickson Carr was voted the best.

== Plot summary ==
Chief Inspector Masters receives a note that reads "There will be ten teacups at number 4, Berwick Terrace, W. 8, on Wednesday, July 31, at 5 p.m. precisely. The presence of the Metropolitan Police Is respectfully requested." The note troubles Masters because, two years earlier, he received a similar note that was ignored requesting that the police go to a different location. On the previous occasion a man named William Dartley was found shot dead, in a room with ten very expensive teacups (patterned with a peacock feather motif). The house where Dartley was found had no furnishings in any room, except for the room where his body was found.

Masters takes the note to Sir Henry Merrivale, who assumes that Dartley was murdered over the teacups but realizes that that doesn't make sense, because the murderer brought the cups. H.M. then focuses on the second note, finding out that 4 Berwick Terrace is also an empty house. Inspector Masters reports that the day before some furniture was delivered to the house, and he responds by having the house guarded and having a police officer posted outside the newly-furnished room at all times.

Masters discovers that a room in the house, a strongroom on the top floor, is going to be a meeting place for a man named Vance Keating and an unknown man or organization. Although Keating doesn't want police protection, Detective-Sergeant Pollard guards the door. At 5 p.m., two gunshots are heard. Pollard rushes into the room where he finds Keating shot dead, with a gun lying beside him. There is a thick layer of dust on the carpet that reveals only Pollard's and Keating's footprints. Pollard notices the window is open, and runs to it, noting that Sergeant Hollis stands directly under the window. Pollard suggests that the killer jumped out the window, to which Hollis's reply is "No one came out this window."
