= Dangerous Crossing =

1953 film noir mystery film by Joseph M. Newman

- Theatrical release poster
- Directed by: Joseph M. Newman
- Screenplay by: Leo Townsend
- Based on: "Cabin B-13"; 1943 radio play by John Dickson Carr
- Produced by: Robert Bassler
- Starring: Jeanne Crain; Michael Rennie
- Cinematography: Joseph LaShelle
- Edited by: William H. Reynolds
- Color process: Black and white
- Production company: 20th Century Fox
- Distributed by: 20th Century Fox
- Release date: August 7, 1953
- Running time: 75 minutes
- Country: United States
- Language: English
- Budget: $500,000

Dangerous Crossing is a 1953 American mystery film starring Jeanne Crain and Michael Rennie and directed by Joseph M. Newman. Based on the 1943 radio play Cabin B-13 by John Dickson Carr, the story revolves around newlyweds who become physically separated while on their honeymoon on an ocean liner.

== Plot ==
On an ocean liner sailing from New York, John Bowman lifts his bride Ruth over the threshold of cabin B16, where Anna Quinn, a stewardess busy with finishing touches, greets them and withdraws. Ruth has been unsettled by her father's recent death; she and John have had a whirlwind courtship of just four weeks. John suggests Ruth go on deck to enjoy the ship's departure while he takes fifteen minutes to see the purser to deposit money for safekeeping. As Ruth waves to the crowd in excitement, fellow passenger Kay Prentiss asks Ruth who is seeing her off. Ruth replies that she is waving to no one in particular, as she is traveling with her husband. The couple had agreed to meet in one of the ship's bars but John fails to show up. After waiting for over an hour, Ruth visits the purser and discovers that John has not been there.

Returning to her cabin, she finds it locked and the attending steward insists that cabin B16 has not been booked for this trip. She is registered solo under her maiden name, Ruth Stanton, in cabin B18, where her luggage is found, but not John's. Insisting on seeing cabin B16, Ruth finds no sign of having previously been there. She cannot produce her ticket or passport because these are in John's possession. Since they were married only the day before, she is not wearing a wedding ring and her luggage still bears tags with her maiden name.

Under stress, she faints, and the ship's physician, Dr. Manning, embarks on a search for the facts. Anna insists she never saw Ruth or John. While boarding John had fallen back in the crowd going up the gangplank and was briefly separated from her; the second officer who greeted Ruth during that boarding says she was unaccompanied. She can think of no one else who has seen her husband.

The captain asks whether John may have left the ship and orders it searched, to no avail. Kay Prentiss tells the doctor that Ruth had admitted waving to nobody at the ship's departure, which they find odd. Eventually, the crew suspect Ruth is delusional.

That night, John phones Ruth with a cryptic warning that they are in danger and to trust no one; he then hangs up. Manning gets her to open up about the recent death of her father, a wealthy steel executive. When Ruth's company's managing director, doctor and servants respond to inquiry that they are unaware of a John Bowman and she is unmarried, the doctor suggests to Ruth that her wedding was wishful thinking. She explains that John wanted a quick, quiet ceremony. Her uncle might scheme to get her large inheritance that includes her father's company; thus, she kept the marriage secret. That evening, John phones again, asking Ruth to meet him on deck. They meet only briefly because they hear others approach and John runs into the fog, after telling Ruth to meet him again later. Ruth chases him but ends up in the ship's crowded ballroom, where she goes into hysterics. The captain demands she be locked in her cabin.

Manning attends to the ship's third mate, Jack Barlowe, who has been confined to his cabin with illness since the ship's departure. Known only to his accomplice Anna Quinn, Barlowe is the missing John Bowman, who has faked illness to conceal himself in his quarters. To inherit her fortune as her husband, he has schemed to make Ruth seem insane and plans to ultimately fake her suicide. When Barlowe learns Ruth has been locked up, he tells Anna to facilitate her escape. Anna “accidentally” leaves the door unlocked as she checks in on Ruth. Ruth slips out to keep her assignation with John. John tries to throw Ruth overboard—to look like the unstable Ruth committed suicide—but is stopped by Manning. In the ensuing struggle, John falls over the side.

The captain returns Ruth's passport and marriage certificate—found in Barlowe's cabin—apologizing to Ruth for challenging both her veracity and sanity. Anna has confessed to the plot. Ruth and Manning have developed a relationship; he will be there to help her get over her ordeal.

== Cast ==
- Jeanne Crain as Ruth Stanton Bowman
- Michael Rennie as Dr. Paul Manning
- Max Showalter as Jim Logan (as Casey Adams)
- Carl Betz as John Bowman
- Mary Anderson as Anna Quinn
- Marjorie Hoshelle as Kay Prentiss
- Willis Bouchey as Capt. Peters
- Yvonne Peattie as Miss Bridges

== Production ==
The radio play Cabin B-13 was very popular when broadcast in 1943 and had been adapted for TV in 1948.

Film rights were bought by 20th Century Fox, which started production in 1952 under the name Ship Story. Corinne Calvet and Gary Merrill were the original leads. Joseph M. Newman was originally meant to direct a film called The Raid but it was having casting issues and the director was under contract to the studio, so they transferred him to Ship Story. Eventually the lead roles were assigned to Fox contract stars Jeanne Crain and Michael Rennie. Filming started January 1953.

Joseph Newman later recalled it was "a very low budget picture. At that time Twentieth Century Fox wanted to cut down on costs. But I think it was a good mystery. Crain and Rennie were both delightful people and pleasant to work with."

== Reception ==
In The New York Times, A. H. Weiler gave the film a lukewarm contemporary review, writing

Although it maintains an eerie quality and suspense through the first half of its footage, Dangerous Crossing, which arrived at the Globe yesterday, is only a mildly engrossing adventure ... While sound effects, background music and shipboard sets lend a peculiar fascination to the melodrama, the acting of the cast adds little tautness to the proceedings. As the beleaguered heiress Jeanne Crain is beautiful but not entirely convincing in the role ... Dangerous Crossing, in effect, is intriguing only part of the way.... Thereafter, it is a commonplace trip.
