= Henri Bencolin =

Fictional detective character

- First appearance: The Shadow of the Goat
- Last appearance: The Four False Weapons
- Created by: John Dickson Carr

In-universe information
- Gender: Male
- Occupation: Magistrate
- Nationality: French

Henri Bencolin is a fictional detective created by John Dickson Carr. He was Carr's first series detective, appearing in five "locked-room" and "impossible crime" mystery novels in the 1930s, and four short stories that appeared even earlier. In later decades, Carr did not return to the Bencolin character, but instead focused on creating English sleuths such as Dr. Gideon Fell and Sir Henry Merrivale.

== Biography ==
Bencolin is a juge d'instruction (examining magistrate) in the Paris judicial system, and occasionally takes private cases. During World War I, he served as a French spymaster. Bencolin has a forbidding appearance. The narrator of the stories, American writer Jeff Marle, describes him as looking "Satanic", and characterizes his manner with witnesses and suspects as sometimes very harsh. He is sophisticated and cultured, and written to appeal to an American audience that would associate France and French people with sophistication.

== List of stories ==
=== Short stories ===
The short stories in which Bencolin appears were all originally published in The Haverfordian:

- "The Shadow of the Goat"
- "The Fourth Suspect"
- "The End of Justice"
- "The Murder In Number Four" (1928)

=== Novels ===
- It Walks By Night (1930)
- The Lost Gallows (1931)
- Castle Skull (1931 – not published in the UK until 1973)
- The Waxworks Murder (1932)
- The Four False Weapons (1937)

== Spin-off ==
Bencolin is mentioned in Carr's book Poison in Jest (1932), but does not appear in it. The novel, however, is narrated by Marle.
