= Bill Lewthwaite =

British film editor

William John Lewthwaite was a British film editor. Lewthwaite died on 16 June 2011 at the age of 86.

== Selected filmography ==
- Into the Blue (1950)
- Odette (1950)
- Derby Day (1952)
- Trent's Last Case (1952)
- Front Page Story (1954)
- Burnt Evidence (1954)
- That Woman Opposite (1957)
- The Naked Truth (1957)
- Too Many Crooks (1959)
- The Spider's Web (1960)
- On the Beat (1962)
- Panic (1963)
- Mystery Submarine (1963)
- Half a Sixpence (1967)
- The Royal Hunt of the Sun (1969)
- Dulcima (1971)
