= Patrick Butler for the Defence =

1956 novel by John Dickson Carr

- First edition (US)
- Author: John Dickson Carr
- Language: English
- Series: Patrick Butler
- Genre: Mystery, detective
- Publisher: Hamish Hamilton (UK) & Harper (USA)
- Publication date: 1956
- Publication place: United Kingdom
- Media type: Print (hardback & paperback)
- Pages: 236 (1st UK)

Patrick Butler for the Defence, first published in 1956, is a detective story by American writer John Dickson Carr, which features Carr's series detective Patrick Butler (who previously appeared in Below Suspicion). This novel is a mystery of the type known as a whodunnit.

== Plot summary ==
James Vaughan and Hugh Prentice are the two junior partners of the law practice of Prentice, Prentice & Vaughan and its senior partner, Hugh's uncle Charles Prentice. Hugh and his fiancé Helen are in Hugh's office, which is littered with detective stories; a French-speaking Arab who calls himself Abu of Ispahan arrives and asks for an appointment to discuss a private matter. Helen leaves, and Hugh must deliver a brief to famed defense lawyer Patrick Butler. Since Abu wishes to deal with no one except "Meester Pren-tees", Hugh asks him to wait for forty-five minutes; before Hugh leaves, Abu announces "All my troubles have been caused by your gloves." Hugh goes down the hall to speak with James Vaughan. When they hear a scream, both rush back to Hugh's office to find Abu stabbed; he has just enough time and breath to gasp "Your gloves" in French before he expires. Hugh immediately enlists the help of Patrick Butler, who is accompanied by the upper-crust Lady Pamela de Saxe. The three, with occasional assistance from Helen, embark upon a series of breakneck escapes from the police and Hugh's strait-laced uncle while they gather evidence (including the beautiful stage magician Cécile Feyoum, Abu's widow). In the course of the evening, Hugh falls out of love with Helen and into love with Pam, and at the night's climax Patrick Butler calls everyone together and reveals the name of the murderer, and the meaning of the gloves.
