= The Burning Court (film) =

1962 film

The burning court
- Directed by: Julien Duvivier
- Starring: Jean-Claude Brialy; Édith Scob; Nadja Tiller; Claude Rich
- Music by: Georges Auric
- Release date: 1962
- Running time: 110 minutes

The Burning Court (French: La chambre ardente, pronounced [la ʃɑ̃bʁ aʁdɑ̃t]) is a French-Italian-German film directed by Julien Duvivier, released in 1962. The script was written by Charles Spaak and Duvivier, from the 1937 novel of the same name by John Dickson Carr.

The cast included Catherine Rich who was making her debut on the screen.

== Plot ==
Historian Michel Boissard (Walter Giller), is invited with his wife Marie (Édith Scob), a descendant of Madame de Brinvilliers, the notorious poisoner, to the château of Mathias Desgrez (Frédéric Duvallès). Mathias Desgrez is a descendant of the last lover of the Marchioness, who denounced her. Mathias is adept in the occult arts, which he practises with his friend Dr. Hermann (Antoine Balpêtré). To the château come Marc Desgrez (Jean-Claude Brialy), and Stephane Desgrez (Claude Rich), nephews of Mathias, who are waiting impatiently for their inheritance. The wife of Marc, Lucy (Perrette Pradier) also has hopes. And Marc's mistress Myra (Nadja Tiller) who is Mathias' personal nurse, would like to accelerate Marc's uncle's death. Mathias himself is fascinated by Marie Boissard.

One night, a little time later, Mathias dies having received a visit from a mysterious woman bringing him medications, and is seen by a servant. Mathias is buried and then his body disappears just when the analysis proves that he has undoubtedly been poisoned. By whom? Lucy - eager to inherit? Myra - to please her lover? Marie - to avenge her betrayed ancestor, by the ancestor of Mathias? Inspector Krauss (Claude Piéplu) enquires into the matter.
