= That Woman Opposite =

1957 British film by Compton Bennett

- UK promotional poster
- Directed by: Compton Bennett
- Written by: Compton Bennett; John Dickson Carr
- Produced by: William J. Gell
- Starring: Phyllis Kirk; Dan O'Herlihy; William Franklyn
- Cinematography: Lionel Banes
- Edited by: Bill Lewthwaite
- Music by: Stanley Black
- Distributed by: Monarch Film Corporation
- Release date: 28 May 1957
- Running time: 85 minutes
- Country: United Kingdom
- Language: English

That Woman Opposite (U.S. title: City After Midnight; also known as Woman Opposite) is a 1957 British crime drama, directed by Compton Bennett and starring Phyllis Kirk, Dan O'Herlihy and William Franklyn. The screenplay, by Bennett, was adapted from John Dickson Carr's 1942 novel The Emperor's Snuff-Box.

== Plot ==
In a town on the French coast, English antiques dealer Maurice Lawes is a witness to the night-time murder of a gendarme. The killer spots Lawes at his window, and realises he has been seen. The following evening, Lawes' daughter Janice finds her father also murdered.

An investigation is launched by the local police and a private insurance investigator Dermot Kinross. The initial assumption – that Lawes was murdered by the gendarme's killer to prevent identification – soon comes into question as several other individuals connected to Lawes are revealed to have plausible motives for the murder.

Lawes' son Toby is found to have been embezzling funds from his father to pay off a blackmailing ex-mistress; Toby's fiancée Eve, living directly opposite the murder scene, is investigated and found to have in her possession bloodstained clothing which she cannot satisfactorily explain away. Eve's ex-husband Ned turns out to have a particular interest in a rare snuffbox from Lawes' personal collection which is discovered to be missing, and may have killed Lawes when disturbed in the process of burglary.

Eve comes under particular scrutiny as it is considered she could have been an accomplice of either Toby or Ned. It falls to Kinross to unravel the actual chain of events and arrive at the correct solution.

== Cast ==
- Phyllis Kirk as Eve Atwood
- Dan O'Herlihy as Dermot Kinross
- William Franklyn as Ned Atwood
- Jack Watling as Toby Lawes
- Wilfrid Hyde-White as Sir Maurice Lawes
- Petula Clark as Janice Lawes
- Guido Lorraine as Aristide Goron
- Margaret Withers as Lady Helena Lawes
- Tita Dane as Marie Latour
- Robert Raikes as Bill
- André Charisse as Gaston
- Jacques Cey as Busson
- Irene Moore as Diana

== Critical reception ==
The Monthly Film Bulletin wrote: "If unsubtle, the many false trails are cleverly devised and dramatically quite effective. The pace is too slow for suspense, but the photography is excellent and the backgrounds authentic."

Picturegoer wrote: "At last, a British thriller with class ... here's a gloss that usually comes with an import label".

Radio Times said: "Don't expect too much of this modest film... and you'll be agreeably entertained by an efficiently directed work graced by many recognisable faces".
