= The Judas Window =

1938 novel by John Dickson Carr

The Judas Window (also published as The Crossbow Murder)
- First US edition
- Author: John Dickson Carr
- Language: English
- Series: Henry Merrivale
- Genre: Mystery fiction, detective fiction
- Publisher: Morrow (US, 1938); Heinemann (UK, 1938)
- Publication date: 1938
- Publication place: United Kingdom
- Media type: Print (hardback & paperback)
- Pages: 191
- OCLC: 16651698
- Dewey Decimal: 813/.52 19
- LC Class: PS3505.A763 J83 1987
- Preceded by: The Ten Teacups aka The Peacock Feather Murders (1937)
- Followed by: Death in Five Boxes (1939)

The Judas Window (also published as The Crossbow Murder) is a famous locked room mystery novel by the American writer John Dickson Carr, writing under the name of Carter Dickson, published in 1938 and featuring detective Sir Henry Merrivale.

In a poll of 17 mystery writers and reviewers, this novel was voted as the fifth best locked room mystery of all time. The Hollow Man also by John Dickson Carr was voted the best.

== Plot summary ==
James Caplon Answell arranges to visit his future father-in-law, Avory Hume, at his house in London. Hume invites the prospective bridegroom into his strong room that is fitted with sturdy metal shutters and a thick wooden door. The room contains trophies and arrows that relate to Hume's hobby of archery, and they chat about archery while Hume pours drinks from a cut-glass decanter. As Answell collapses, he realizes that the drink has been drugged. When he comes to, he's alone in the locked and bolted room with Hume, who has been fatally skewered with an arrow.

The remainder of the novel takes place at Answell's trial for the murder of Hume, and he is being defended by barrister and amateur detective Sir Henry Merrivale. We learn that Hume has set the actions of the plot in motion because he believes that he is having an interview not with the wealthy and blameless man who wants to marry his daughter, but a similarly named relative, Captain Answell, who is blackmailing her (and in a plot development that is extremely frank for the mores of 1938, she is being blackmailed because she posed for "obscene" photographs for her lover). Hume's household has participated to some extent in the activities that have conspired to make Answell look guilty. The decanter with the drugged drink has been replaced with an innocuous duplicate, and some mysteriously disappearing items include a suitcase full of clothing and an ink-pad. But it is the location of a tiny piece of blue feather from the fatal arrow that proves to be the decisive clue that reveals the murderer—it's revealed in the climactic courtroom scene to be hidden in the "Judas window".

In the British prison system, a "Judas window" is in the door of a cell and enables the guards to observe prisoners without being seen themselves. But Sir Henry Merrivale points out another Judas window that is in every room, but that no one notices.
