= Lionel Banes =

British cinematographer

- Born: 27 July 1904; Manchester, Lancashire, England, United Kingdom
- Died: 1996 (aged 91–92); United Kingdom
- Occupation: Cinematographer
- Years active: 1942–1969 (film and TV)

Lionel Banes (1904–1996) was a British cinematographer and special effects photographer. During and after the Second World War he was employed by Ealing Studios and shot the 1949 Ealing Comedy Passport to Pimlico. Later in his career he worked on a variety of television productions including many episodes of the 1960s series The Saint.

He cited Karl Freund and James Wong Howe as his greatest influences.

== Selected filmography ==
=== Film ===
- Bedelia (1946)
- The Captive Heart (1946)
- Frieda (1947)
- Nicholas Nickleby (1947)
- The Loves of Joanna Godden (1947)
- Against the Wind (1948)
- Passport to Pimlico (1949)
- Train of Events (1949)
- The Blue Lamp (1950)
- The Magnet (1950)
- Valley of Song (1953)
- The Good Beginning (1953)
- Dangerous Cargo (1954)
- The Night My Number Came Up (1955)
- No Road Back (1957)
- That Woman Opposite (1957)
- The Surgeon's Knife (1957)
- I Only Arsked! (1958)
- The Haunted Strangler (1958)
- Fiend Without a Face (1958)
- The Lamp in Assassin Mews (1962)
- She Always Gets Their Man (1962)
- The Durant Affair (1962)
- The Battleaxe (1962)

=== Television ===
- Colonel March of Scotland Yard (1954–56)
- The Adventures of the Scarlet Pimpernel (1955–56)
- The Count of Monte Cristo (1956)
- The Saint (1962–65)
- The Baron (1966)
- The Avengers (1966)
- Man in a Suitcase (1967–68)

== Bibliography ==
- Barr, Charles. Ealing Studios. University of California Press, 1998.
