= Colonel March of Scotland Yard =

British television series

- Genre: Crime drama; Mystery
- Based on: The Department of Queer Complaints by Carter Dickson
- Directed by: Cy Endfield; Terence Fisher; Arthur Crabtree; Bernard Knowles and others
- Starring: Boris Karloff; Ewan Roberts
- Composers: Edwin Astley (9 episodes); Philip Green (1 episode); John Lanchbery
- Country of origin: United Kingdom
- Original language: English
- No. of seasons: 1
- No. of episodes: 26

Production
- Producer: Hannah Weinstein
- Cinematography: Lionel Banes
- Running time: 30 minutes
- Production company: Fountain Films in association with Panda Productions

Original release
- Network: ITV

Colonel March of Scotland Yard is a British television series consisting of a single series of 26 episodes first broadcast in the United States from December 1954 to Spring of 1955. The series premiered on British television on 24 September 1955 on the newly opened ITV London station for the weekends Associated Television. It is based on author John Dickson Carr's (aka Carter Dickson) fictional detective Colonel March from his book The Department of Queer Complaints (1940). Carr was a mystery author who specialised in locked-room whodunnits and other 'impossible' crimes: murder mysteries that seemed to defy possibility. The stories of the television series followed in the same vein with March solving cases that baffle Scotland Yard and the British police. The department itself is sometimes referred to as "D3". Boris Karloff starred as Colonel March.

== Production ==
The series was made at Southall Studios in Middlesex, England (and, later, Nettlefold Studios in Walton-on-Thames, England) and was produced by Fountain Films for ITV. In July 1952, Karloff and his wife Evelyn sailed to England, where Karloff filmed three different pilot episodes to be shown to TV executives. While awaiting a decision on more episodes, the three pilots were combined into a feature film called Colonel March Investigates (1953). In 1953, Karloff returned to England to film 23 more episodes, making a total of 26.

The Colonel March TV series premiered first in the United States from Dec. 1954 to Spring of 1955, with a total of 26 episodes. It first premiered in England in 1955 on Associated Television (ITV London, weekends), broadcast on 26 consecutive Saturday evenings from 24 September 1955 until 17 March 1956.

The show starred Boris Karloff as the urbane, tweed-wearing, eye-patched sleuth. No reason was ever given for the wearing of the patch. Other regular actors included Ewan Roberts as Inspector Ames of Scotland Yard and Eric Pohlmann as Inspector Goron of the Paris Sûreté. (In the episode "The Second Mona Lisa", Pohlmann played a Middle Eastern character called The Emir.) Roberts' Scottish accent grows stronger as the series progresses, from posh English in some episodes to strong Scottish burr for others.

The opening title sequence showed Colonel March taking off his coat in his office and writing the title of each episode in a book. This then dissolves to an image of an object from within the following story, what Alfred Hitchcock would call a MacGuffin, a fairly unimportant plot device that starts the story rolling and/or keeps it moving along. Often it's a murder weapon or an item of clothing. Sometimes its relevance is a mystery until it is revealed later in the episode. Other episodes, such as in "The Headless Hat", show the item that the episode is named after.

The episode "The Talking Head" uses the complete version of the original theme tune during the end credits. It was usually truncated and faded up whilst some way through. The show's slightly mysterious and threatening theme tune was changed for the episodes "Error at Daybreak" and "The Silver Curtain" to a piece of jaunty, faster-paced music that had originally been used in previous episodes to accompany shots of a busy city.

Other guest actors in the series include Alan Wheatley, Christopher Lee, Patrick Barr, Hugh Griffith, Marne Maitland (twice), Joan Sims, Anthony Newley, Patricia Owens, George Coulouris, Anton Diffring, Martin Benson, Zena Marshall, Mary Parker, Henryetta Edwards and Robert Brown. The episode "Death and the Other Monkey" features a small acting part by future film director John Schlesinger as a Dutch ship's captain. The episode "Error at Daybreak" features a performance from the then 10-year-old actor Richard O'Sullivan who later went on to star in Man About the House, Robin's Nest and several other ITV series.

== Critical reception ==
In Britain, the series was initially evaluated in the larger context of the programming of the newly launched ITV. Critic Bernard Levin opined: "If there were only something of signifiant badness, then one could at least take a hatchet to it. But who could take a hatchet to Wilson, Keppel, and Betty, stars of Saturday night's variety programme, or to the adventures of 'Colonel March of Scotland Yard', the intellectual content of which is the nearest thing to a hole I have ever seen?"

== List of episodes ==
Episode	Title	First London ITV Transmission (ABC, London)	Transmission in the Midlands (ATV, Midlands)	Archive
1	The Sorcerer	1 October 1955	29 February 1956	16 mm
2	The Abominable Snowman	8 October 1955	7 March 1956	35 mm
3	Present Tense	15 October 1955	15 March 1956	16 mm
4	At Night All Cats Are Gray	22 October 1955	21 March 1956	16 mm
5	The Case of the Kidnapped Poodle	5 November 1955	28 March 1956	16 mm
6	The Invisible Knife	19 October 1955	28 March 1956	16 mm
7	The Strange Event at Roman Fall	4 February 1956	2 April 1956	16 mm
8	The Headless Hat	12 November 1955	11 April 1956	16 mm
9	The Second Mona Lisa	26 November 1955	25 April 1956	35 mm
10	Death in Inner Space	10 December 1955	9 May 1956	35 mm
11	The Talking Head	17 December 1955	16 May 1956	16 mm
12	The Devil Sells His Soul	7 January 1956	6 June 1956	16 mm
13	Murder is Permanent	14 January 1956	13 June 1956	35 mm
14	The Silent Vow	21 January 1956	20 June 1956	16 mm
15	Death and the Other Monkey	28 January 1956	27 June 1956	35 mm
16	The Stolen Crime	11 February 1956	4 July 1956	35 mm
17	The Silver Curtain	18 February 1956	10 July 1956	35 mm
18	Error at Daybreak	25 February 1956	17 July 1956	35 mm
19	Hot Money	3 March 1956	24 July 1956	16 mm
20	The Missing Link	19 November 1955	31 July 1956	35 mm
21	The Case of the Misguided Missal	3 December 1955	7 August 1956	16 mm
22	The Deadly Gift	24 December 1955	14 August 1956	16 mm
23	The Case of the Lively Ghost	31 December 1955	21 August 1956	16 mm
24	Death in the Dressing Room	10 March 1956	28 August 1956	35 mm
25	The New Invisible Man	17 March 1956	4 September 1956	35 mm
26	Passage at Arms	24 September 1955	22 February 1956	35 mm

== Home media ==
Eight episodes (only) of the series have been released to home video by Alpha Video.

The region 2 DVD release of the 1970 Karloff film Cauldron of Blood (aka Blind Man's Bluff) includes the episode "The Silver Curtain" as an extra.

All 26 episodes are available to stream on Amazon Prime, Apple TV and Hoopla (digital media service). The show has been regularly shown on the UK TV channel Talking Pictures TV.
