= The Reader Is Warned =

1939 novel by John Dickson Carr

The Reader is Warned
- First US edition
- Author: John Dickson Carr writing as "Carter Dickson"
- Language: English
- Series: Henry Merrivale
- Genre: Mystery fiction Detective fiction
- Publisher: Morrow (US, 1939); Heinemann (UK, 1939, first edition)
- Publication date: 1939
- Publication place: United Kingdom
- Media type: Print (hardback & paperback)
- Preceded by: Drop to His Death
- Followed by: And So to Murder

The Reader is Warned is a mystery novel by the American writer John Dickson Carr, who published it under the name of Carter Dickson. It is a whodunit and features the series detective Sir Henry Merrivale.

== Plot summary ==
Sir Henry Merrivale must solve an impossible crime when a man dies in his home in such a way that it seems no one could have been sufficiently close to him to have committed murder, and it is unclear exactly how or why he died.

The circumstances are complicated by the presence of the victim's wife, a writer of clever detective stories, the disappearance of a book in which she jots down unusual methods of murder, and a strange house guest who believes that he can kill people at a distance by the use of something he calls "Teleforce".
