= The Punch and Judy Murders =

1936 novel by John Dickson Carr

The Punch and Judy Murders (aka The Magic Lantern Murders)
- First US edition
- Author: John Dickson Carr writing as "Carter Dickson"
- Language: English
- Series: Henry Merrivale
- Genre: Mystery fiction, detective fiction
- Publisher: Morrow (US, 1937); Heinemann (UK, first edition, 1936)
- Publication date: 1936
- Publication place: United Kingdom
- Media type: Print (hardback & paperback)
- Pages: 300pp
- Preceded by: The Unicorn Murders
- Followed by: The Ten Teacups (aka The Peacock Feather Murders)

The Punch and Judy Murders (also published as The Magic Lantern Murders) is a 1936 mystery novel written by John Dickson Carr under the pen name of Carter Dickson. It is a whodunnit which features the fictional detective Sir Henry Merrivale.

It was the last book read by the former American president Franklin D. Roosevelt before his death.

== Plot summary ==
Kenwood Blake, introduced in the previous Sir Henry Merrivale mystery The Unicorn Murders, is about to marry a former British Secret Service operative, Evelyn Cheyne, when he is sidetracked by an urgent telegram from Sir Henry asking him to come to Torquay to play an undercover role under an alias he had used in World War 1, "Robert Butler".

Paul Hogenauer, a polymath of German origin living in Torquay, has aroused the suspicion of Sir Henry and Colonel Charters, the Chief Constable of the county, by his recent interest in ghosts and spiritualism. Sir Henry and Charters feel that anti-British espionage may underlie recent events, and they suspect the involvement of an international spy known only as L.

A police officer observing Hogenauer's house reports "the room was dark, but it seemed to be full of small, moving darts of light flickering round a thing like a flower-pot turned upside down." Blake, as Butler, tries to break into Hogenauer's house and is promptly arrested. To his great surprise, Sir Henry and Charters disavow any knowledge of his actions.

Blake/Butler escapes, breaks into Hogenauer's house and finds Hogenauer dead in his easy chair, grinning from the rictus of strychnine. A colleague of Hogenauer named Dr. Keppel is soon found dead in a hotel miles away, apparently killed at the same time as Hogenauer. Blake/Butler stays a step ahead of the police and races around investigating espionage, counterfeiting, spiritualism, and multiple impersonations. Finally, Sir Henry examines and discards three proposed solutions, and reveals the murderer just in time for the wedding.
