= The Red Widow Murders =

1925 novel by John Dickson Carr

- First US edition
- Author: John Dickson Carr writing as "Carter Dickson"
- Language: English
- Series: Henry Merrivale
- Genre: Mystery, detective, novel
- Publisher: Morrow (US, 1935); Heinemann (UK, 1935)
- Publication date: 1935
- Publication place: United Kingdom
- Media type: Print (hardback & paperback)
- Preceded by: The White Priory Murders
- Followed by: The Unicorn Murders

The Red Widow Murders is a mystery novel by the American writer John Dickson Carr (1906–1977), who published it under the name of Carter Dickson. It is a locked room mystery and features his series detective, Sir Henry Merrivale.

== Plot summary ==
An oddly assorted group of people draw cards to see who will spend the night locked into a room said to be haunted by the "Red Widow"—a legendary figure who was married to the executioner who guillotined French aristocrats. In the morning, the victim is found dead, locked inside a room whose door was continuously under observation. He has been poisoned with curare, which must be absorbed into the body through a break in the skin, but no wounds of any kind are found on the body. Henry Merrivale must solve the mystery.
