= The Bare Idea =

1938 play

- Original language: English
- Written by: Gordon Sherry
- Genre: Comedy

Premiere
- Date: 21 November 1938
- Place: Little Theatre, Hull

The Bare Idea is a 1938 comedy play by the British writer Gordon Sherry. A farce debuting in Hull in 1938, the West End appearance was produced during the Phoney War period of the Second World War. It revolves around a nudist camp being turned into a centre of financial scheming. It ran for 31 performances at the Comedy Theatre between 10 and 27 January 1940. The cast included Ellen Pollock, Gerald Case, Oliver Gordon and Roddy Hughes. The theatre was under the control of Archibald Nettlefold. The sets were designed by Hal Burton.

== Bibliography ==
- Wearing, J.P. The London Stage 1940–1949: A Calendar of Productions, Performers, and Personnel. Rowman & Littlefield, 2014.
