= Josephine Cox =

British writer (1938–2020)

- Born: Josephine Brindle; 15 July 1938; Blackburn, Lancashire, England
- Died: 17 July 2020 (aged 82)
- Other names: Jo Cox: Jane Brindle
- Occupation: Writer
- Spouse: Kenneth Cox (m. 1956)
- Children: 2
- Website: josephinecox.com

Josephine Cox, née Brindle (15 July 1938 – 17 July 2020), also known as Jo Cox, was an English author. Her books were frequently bestsellers and the UK Public Lending Rights figures often listed her in the top three borrowed authors.

== Biography ==
Cox was born in Blackburn, Lancashire, and was one of the 10 children of an alcoholic father. In 1956, she married Kenneth Cox and they had two sons. When her children were of school-age, she began college, and was offered a place at the University of Cambridge, but family commitments did not allow this. She eventually became a teacher and wrote her first novel, Her Father’s Sins (published 1987), after her friend brought her paper and pens to keep her occupied while Cox was in hospital.

Cox also wrote under the name Jane Brindle, her mother's name. Altogether she wrote more than 50 books.

Her publisher, Harper Collins, announced Cox's death in 2020, 2 days after her 82nd birthday. She was described as a prolific author who grew up in poverty and went on to sell millions of copies of her family dramas, totaling over 60 books, over a writing career that spanned more than three decades.

== Selected works ==
- The Beachcomber (2013), HarperCollins
- The Broken Man (2013), HarperCollins
- The Runaway Woman (2014), HarperCollins
- Two Sisters (2020), HarperCollins
