= Na krásné samotě =

1938 novel by František Bernard Vaněk

Na krásné samotě is a Czech novel by František Bernard Vaněk. It was first published in 1938.
