= El gesticulador =

El gesticulador (The Impostor) is a 1938 play by Mexican dramatist Rodolfo Usigli.

== Plot ==
The protagonist, César Rubio, is an unemployed professor who, in the aftermath of the Mexican Revolution, settles with his family in a small town in the north of Mexico. There, a professor from Harvard University confuses him for a missing revolutionary hero with the same name. Rubio claims to be the deceased hero, telling the professor that, disillusioned with the course of the Revolution, he had embraced anonymity until thirty years thereafter. The story is published in The New York Times, and Rubio comes to the attention of his compatriots, receiving accolades and fielding offers to run for the governorship of his state against a corrupt Revolutionary general. Rubio loses himself in his new identity, viewing it as an opportunity to renew the promise of the Revolution. Things go awry when the corrupt general against whom César is running forces a meeting between the two. In their conversation, each attempts to blackmail the other. Navarro, the corrupt general, knows that César is not the general he claims to be. César, on the other hand, figures out that Navarro killed general César Rubio during the war. Outside the door was César's son, who had trouble reconciling his father's newly revealed heroism. Despite Navarro's threats, César proceeds with his candidacy for governor. After leaving to attend the election, Miguel, Julia, and Elena (César's son, daughter, and wife, respectively) discuss the nature of their father's actions; Julia supports him, while Miguel, and ultimately Elena are unable to come to terms with his lie. However, Elena also realizes that Navarro will try to kill César, and sends Miguel to warn his father of the assassination. Unfortunately, he arrives too late; both César and the assassin have been killed, leaving no link back to Navarro. Navarro briefly returns to the house to gloat before addressing the crowd outside, promising that César will be treated as a hero and his family will be taken care of. While the crowd is initially hesitant, Navarro's apparent goodwill convinces them, and they cheer both him and César.

== Controversy ==
The play was daring for its time in that it used the true language of contemporary politics, a first for Mexican literature. Originally published in the literary review El hijo pródigo in 1938, the play was not staged until 1947. Its debut in the Mexico City's Palacio de Bellas Artes was welcomed by the theater-going public, but was met with hostility by the Mexican government. At issue was the play's declaration of the death of the Mexican Revolution in its institutionalization in the Partido Revolucionario Institucional.

The government cancelled several performances, and writers were hired to severely criticize the performances that were allowed to go on. The work thus became the only play in Mexican history to be censored by the government.
