= Edgar Innes Fripp =

English clergyman (1861-1931)

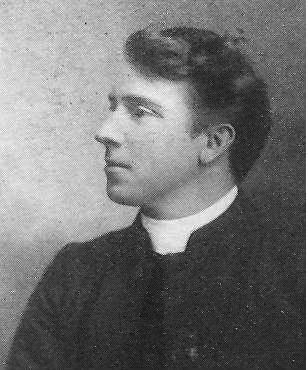
E. I. Fripp before 1900.

Edgar Innes Fripp (27 November 1861 – 9 November 1931) was a Unitarian minister and English antiquarian who specialized in Shakespearean research in the archives of Stratford-upon-Avon, and the father of the artist Paul Fripp.

== Life ==
Born in London to George Arthur Fripp (1813–1896) and Mary Fripp, nee Percival (1825–1887). Fripp graduated from Manchester College, Oxford, and served as a Unitarian minister from 1887 to 1924.

He died on 9 Nov 1931 in Colchester, Essex, and was buried on 12 Nov 1931 in Stratford upon Avon, Warwickshire.

== Family ==
Fripp married Edith Caroline Morley on 16 Apr 1889, and they had four children. She died 28 Jan 1945 in Mitford, Northumberland, and is buried with her husband in Stratford.

== Major works ==
The composition of the book of Genesis. (1892)

Minutes and accounts of the corporation of Stratford-upon-Avon and other records, 1553–1566. Vol 1. (1921) With Richard Savage. Dugdale Society.

Minutes and accounts of the corporation of Stratford-upon-Avon and other records, 1566–1577. Vol 2. (1924) With Richard Savage. Dugdale Society.

Master Richard Quyny: Bailiff of Stratford-upon-Avon and friend of William Shakespeare. (1924) Oxford UP.

Minutes and accounts of the corporation of Stratford-upon-Avon and other records, 1577–1586. Vol 3. (1926) With Richard Savage. Dugdale Society.

Shakespeare's Stratford. (1928) Oxford UP.

Minutes and accounts of the corporation of Stratford-upon-Avon and other records, 1586–1592. Vol. 4 (1929). With Richard Savage. Dugdale Society.

Shakespeare's haunts near Stratford. (1929) Oxford UP.

Shakespeare Studies, biographical and literary. (1930)

Shakespeare, man and artist. Frederick Christian Wellstood, ed. 2 vols. (1938) Oxford UP
