= The Gilded Man =

The Gilded Man may refer to:

- The Gilded Man (novel), a 1942 novel by John Dickson Carr
- The Gilded Man (comics), a 1952 Disney comics story
