= Rodolfo Usigli =

Mexican playwright (1905-1979)

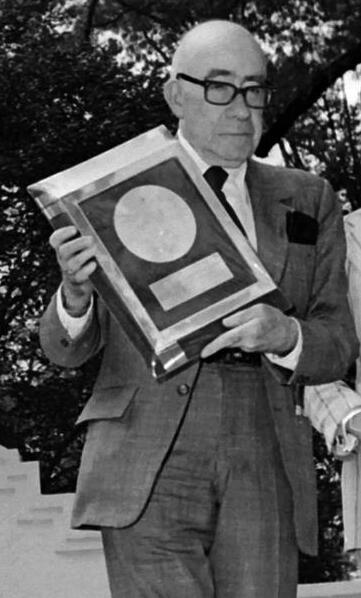
- Rodolfo Usigli receiving a press recognition in 1977
- Born: November 17, 1905. Mexico City
- Died: June 18, 1979 (aged 73)
- Occupations: Playwright, poet, novelist
- Writing career
- Notable work: El gesticulador
- Notable awards: National Prize for Arts

Rodolfo Usigli Wainer (November 17, 1905 – June 18, 1979) was a Mexican playwright, essayist, and diplomat. He has been called "the father of Mexican theater" and "playwright of the Mexican Revolution." In recognition of his work to articulate a national identity for Mexican theater, he was award the Premio Nacional de Ciencias y Artes (Mexican National Prize for Arts and Sciences) in 1972.

== Biography ==
Usigli was born to an Italian father and a Polish mother in Mexico City. In his early childhood, he enjoyed many plays to which his parents took him. His father aspired for him to go to music school, and Usigli spent a year in the National Conservatory of Music before deciding that his real passion was theater. He studied drama at the Yale School of Drama from 1935-1936 on a Rockefeller scholarship, later becoming a professor and diplomat. During his time as a diplomat in 1945, he met George Bernard Shaw in London. After returning to Mexico from the U.S., he established the Midnight Theater and also became a member of the literary circle that formed around the journal Contemporary. During the 1930s, he directed radio dramas.

== Theatre ==
Usigli’s theatre focuses largely the history of Mexico and satirizing his contemporary Mexican society, and how the Mexican middle classes were betrayed, politically and socially, by the Mexican revolution. His plays reflect a sense of the hypocrisies of life after the revolution, both criticizing society and offering models to emulate. He called for a national theater movement that would reflect the truth of the Mexican experience and express the Mexican spirit.

He is perhaps best known for his 1938 play El gesticulador (The Imposter), which critiqued social issues ravaging Mexico, such as misuse of power that the bureaucracy had gotten from the Revolution of 1910. The play was censored by the Mexican government and banned, raising Usigli's reputation.

In 1942, Usigli published another work of scathing quality. In Family Dinner at Home, his intended targets were the apex strata of the Mexican social structure. Usigli experimented with crime fiction in the novel, Ensayo de un crimen (Rehearsal for a Crime), which in 1955 was adapted into a film, The Criminal Life of Archibaldo de la Cruz, by Luis Buñuel. Usigli also wrote several essays on history, art, and theater. He was also an occasional poet, writing modest but interesting poems.

The award-winning Usigli believed the objective of theatre was to tell the truth about society. He was known for his strong representation of women in plays.

Usigli designed strong female characters in several of his plays. Two of Usigli's protégées, Rosario Castellanos and Luisa Josefina Hernández, became important female voices on the Mexican stage. He was also a strong influence on his pupil Jorge Ibargüengoitia and on Josefina Niggli.

== Archive ==
The Rodolfo Usigli Archive in the Walter Havighurst Special Collections at Miami University of Ohio is a repository of Usigli's papers. The archive's website describes it as "the definitive research collection relating to Usigli's life and career, including correspondence, both manuscript and typed drafts of original plays and translations of works by other artists, personal, theatrical, and diplomatic photographs, essays, books, playbills, posters, theses written about Usigli, awards, newspaper and magazine articles, memorabilia, and ephemera."

== Selected works ==
=== Plays ===
- Tres comedias impolíticas (Three Impolitic Comedies), 1935
- El niño y la niebla (The Boy and the Mist), 1936
- Otra primavera (Another Spring)
- Medio tono (Middle Class)
- Mientras amemos (As Long as We Love), begun 1937-38, completed 1948
- El gesticulador (The Imposter), 1938
- La familia cena en casa (Family Dinner at Home), 1942
- Vacaciones (Holidays)
- La mujer no hace milagros (The Woman Does Not Work Miracles)
- La función de la despedida, 1949
- Los fugitivos, produced 1950, published 1951
- Jano es una muchacha, 1952
- Las madres, 1960
- The Corona Trilogy:
  - Corona de sombra (Crown of Shadow), 1943
  - Corona de Fuego (Crown of Fire), 1960
  - Corona de Luz (Crown of Light), 1963

=== Poetry ===
- "Conversación desesperada ("Desperate Conversation"), 1938
- "Sonetos del tiempo y de la muerte" ("Sonnets of Time and Death"), 1954
- "Tiempo y memoria en conversación desesperada", 1981

=== Novels ===
- Ensayo de un crimen (Rehearsal for a Crime), 1944
- Obliteracion (Obliteration) (1973)

=== Nonfiction ===
- México en el teatro (Mexico in Theatre), 1932
- Caminos del teatro en México (Paths of the Theatre in Mexico), 1933
- Anatomía del teatro (Anatomy of Theatre), written 1939, published 1967
- Itinerario del autor dramático (Itinerary of a Dramatist), 1940
- Juan Ruiz de Alarcón en el tiempo, 1967
- Ideas sobre el teatro (Ideas about the Theatre), 1968
- Imagen y prisma de México (1972)

=== Memoirs ===
- Conversaciónes y encuentros (Conversations and Encounters), 1974
  - translated into English in a critical edition as You Have Nothing to Learn from Me: A Literary Relationship Between George Bernard Shaw and Rodolfo Usigli, 2011
