= Compton Bennett =

English film director, writer and producer (1900–1974)

Herbert William Compton Bennett (15 January 1900 – 11 August 1974), better known as Compton Bennett, was an English film director, writer and producer. He is perhaps best known for directing the 1945 film The Seventh Veil and the 1950 version of the film King Solomon's Mines, an adaptation of an Allan Quatermain story.

== Biography ==
Bennett was born in Tunbridge Wells, England. At the beginning of his career, he worked as a band leader and a commercial artist before trying his hand at amateur filmmaking. One of these early films helped him land a job at Alexander Korda's London Films in 1932. There, he became a film editor; later he would help make instructional and propaganda films for the British armed forces during World War II.

Bennett's films tended to be sombre, but were very popular with the moviegoing public. In 1946, Bennett accepted an invitation to go to Hollywood for Universal.

It was, however, during this time that he directed King Solomon's Mines. He was replaced during filming by Andrew Marton.

Bennett eventually returned to the UK. From 1954 to 1957, he left film work to pursue interests in the theatre and television, but produced four films in 1957, After the Ball, Man-Eater, That Woman Opposite and The Flying Scot. Although he continued to write and direct for film and television, his subsequent productions were not as well received.

Bennett died in Sussex, England at the age of 74.

== Appraisal ==
Bennett said he "leapt to fame as director of The Seventh Veil, spent the rest of his career being found out, of which It Started in Paradise is a key example."

== Filmography ==
- The Fox Hunt (1936) (documentary) – editor
- Goofer Trouble (1940)(documentary) – editor
- Find, Fix and Strike (1942) (documentary) – writer, director
- The Big Blockade (1942) – editor
- The Flemish Farm (1943) – editor
- Men of Rochdale (1944) (documentary) – director
- 29 Acacia Avenue (1945) aka The Facts of Love – editor, producer
- The Seventh Veil (1945) – director
- The Years Between (1946) – director
- Daybreak (1948) – director
- My Own True Love (1949) – director
- That Forsyte Woman (1949) aka The Forsyte Saga – director
- King Solomon's Mines (1950) – director
- So Little Time (1952) – director
- The Gift Horse (1952) aka Glory at Sea – director
- It Started in Paradise (1952) – director
- Desperate Moment (1953) – director
- Man-Eater (1957) – director, producer
- That Woman Opposite (1957) aka City After Midnight – writer, director
- After the Ball (1957) – director
- The Flying Scot (1957) aka The Mailbag Robbery – director, producer
- White Hunter (1958) (TV series) – director, producer (episodes edited together as feature Man-Eater)
- The Four Just Men (1959) (TV series) – director
- Beyond the Curtain (1960) – director
- The Adventures of Robin Hood (1960) (TV series) – director
- First Left Past Aden (1961) (documentary) – director
- How to Undress in Public Without Undue Embarrassment (1965) – creator, director, producer
- Brett (1971) (TV series) – creator
