= The Coming Victory of Democracy =

1938 book

- First edition
- Text: The Coming Victory of Democracy at Internet Archive

The Coming Victory of Democracy is a book published in 1938 by Alfred A. Knopf, Inc.

== Description ==
The book contains the abbreviated text of a lecture series delivered by Thomas Mann from February to May in 1938, which was broadcast all over the United States. Mann's intent was to rally support in America for fighting the Nazi regime in Germany. In the text, the German expatriate author explains his moral, political, and artistic reasons for desiring and predicting the victory of democracy over the fascism of his own native country.
