= The Four False Weapons =

1937 novel by John Dickson Carr

- First US edition
- Author: John Dickson Carr
- Language: English
- Series: Henri Bencolin
- Genre: Mystery, detective novel
- Publisher: Hamish Hamilton (UK) & Harper (US, 1938)
- Publication date: 1937
- Publication place: United Kingdom
- Media type: Print (hardback & paperback)
- Pages: 222 pp (Popular Library #282, paperback edition, 1950)

The Four False Weapons, first published in 1937, is a detective story by John Dickson Carr featuring his series detective Henri Bencolin. This novel contains a locked-room situation.

== Plot summary ==
Richard Curtis is a junior British barrister entrusted with disentangling a client of the firm, Ralph Douglas, from his involvement with poule de luxe Rose Klonec. The infamous Rose has had more lovers than she can count—she removes all their cash and jewelry in the process, then discards them. Rose's dead body has been found in Douglas's country villa and in the room are a pistol, a razor, a box of poison pills and a stiletto. Henri Bencolin, of the Paris police, proves that none of these four weapons were used to kill Rose, and that she has been the victim of an unusual fifth. The comings and goings at the villa that night are the subject of much investigation. It is not until Bencolin is invited to take a hand at the Corpses' Club to play a 17th-century game of chance, Basset, that has never been played by any living person, that he resolves the contradictions and solves the crimes.
