= Drop to His Death =

1939 novel by John Dickson Carr

Drop To His Death (aka Fatal Descent)
- First US edition
- Author: John Dickson Carr writing as "Carter Dickson" and John Rhode
- Language: English
- Genre: Mystery fiction, detective fiction
- Publisher: Heinemann (UK); Dodd, Mead & Co. (USA)
- Publication date: 1939
- Publication place: United Kingdom
- Media type: Print (hardback & paperback)
- Preceded by: Death in Five Boxes
- Followed by: The Reader is Warned

Drop To His Death (also published under the title Fatal Descent) is a mystery novel by the American writer John Dickson Carr, in collaboration with British author Cecil Street. It was published under their respective pen names Carter Dickson and John Rhode. It is a locked room mystery.

== Plot summary ==
A businessman, Sir Ernest Tallant, dies in an elevator in such a way that it seems as though no one could have committed the murder, drawing two sleuths to the case, Inspector Hornbeam and Dr. Horatio Glass. They are at odds from the beginning, each dismissive of the other's theories, creating an atmosphere as much of competition as cooperation.

The elevator was perhaps six feet square by eight feet high, with steel walls painted to imitate bronze. Sir Ernest Tallant sat very quietly in the rear right-hand corner. His legs were outthrust stiffly, his back bent a little forward, and the brim of the rakish gray hat shaded his face. He might have been a grotesque parody of Little Jack Horner, if it had not been for the widening bloodstains on the left breast of his jacket. His umbrella lay beside him, also looking oddly childish like his posture. Under each roof corner of the elevator there was a tiny electric light; these four little lights illumined even the wrinkles on the backs of the man's hands, and glittered on the pieces of broken glass.
