= The Gilded Man (novel) =

1942 novel by John Dickson Carr

The Gilded Man (also published as Death and the Gilded Man)
- First edition (US)
- Author: John Dickson Carr writing as "Carter Dickson"
- Language: English
- Series: Henry Merrivale
- Genre: Mystery fiction, Detective fiction
- Publisher: Morrow (US, 1942); Heinemann (UK, 1942)
- Publication date: 1942
- Publication place: United Kingdom
- Media type: Print (hardback & paperback)
- Pages: 216 (in Pocket Books paperback edition #478, 1947, as Death and the Gilded Man)
- Preceded by: Seeing is Believing
- Followed by: She Died a Lady

The Gilded Man (also published as Death and the Gilded Man) is a mystery novel by the American writer John Dickson Carr, who published it under the name of Carter Dickson. It is a whodunnit and features the series detective Sir Henry Merrivale.

== Plot summary ==
Wealthy art connoisseur Dwight Stanhope, his wife Christabel and their daughters, Betty and Eleanor, have invited a couple of guests to their mansion "Waldemere": Vincent James, the "weekend perennial -- charming and a bit thick" and Nick Wood, a young man about whom little is known.

What is odd is that Dwight Stanhope's valuable paintings, including a Rembrandt, have been moved from the burglarproof gallery to the main floor, and their insurance policy has been cancelled. Everyone in the mansion (built by Flavia Venner, a Victorian actress of easy virtue, and including her own private theatre) has the jitters. No one is really surprised when there's a huge clatter in the middle of the night and a masked burglar is found stabbed in front of the paintings—but everyone is amazed to see that the dead burglar is Dwight Stanhope.

Sir Henry Merrivale arrives and suspicious events begin to happen thick and fast; he mixes investigation with an uproarious performance as a stage magician at a children's show and solves the crime.
