= Marriage in Heaven =

1938 novel by Mircea Eliade

1939 edition (publ. Cugetarea)

Marriage in Heaven (Romanian: Nuntă în cer) is a 1938 novel by the Romanian writer Mircea Eliade. It consists of the correspondence between two unhappy men: one whose lover wanted children while he did not, and one who was abandoned by a woman who did not want children while he did. The plot has autobiographical elements from Eliade's relationship with his wife Nina.

An English translation by M. L. Ricketts exists but has not been published. The Italian translation received the 1984 Elba-Brignetti Prize for best foreign book.

== Bibliography ==
- Iridon, Cristina (2009). "Femeia ca centru în 'Nuntă în cer' (The Woman as Centre in 'Nuntă în cer')". Buletinul Universităţii Petrol-Gaze din Ploieşti, Seria Filologie (2): 75–80. ISSN 1224-2020.
