= A Glass Eye at a Keyhole =

1938 book

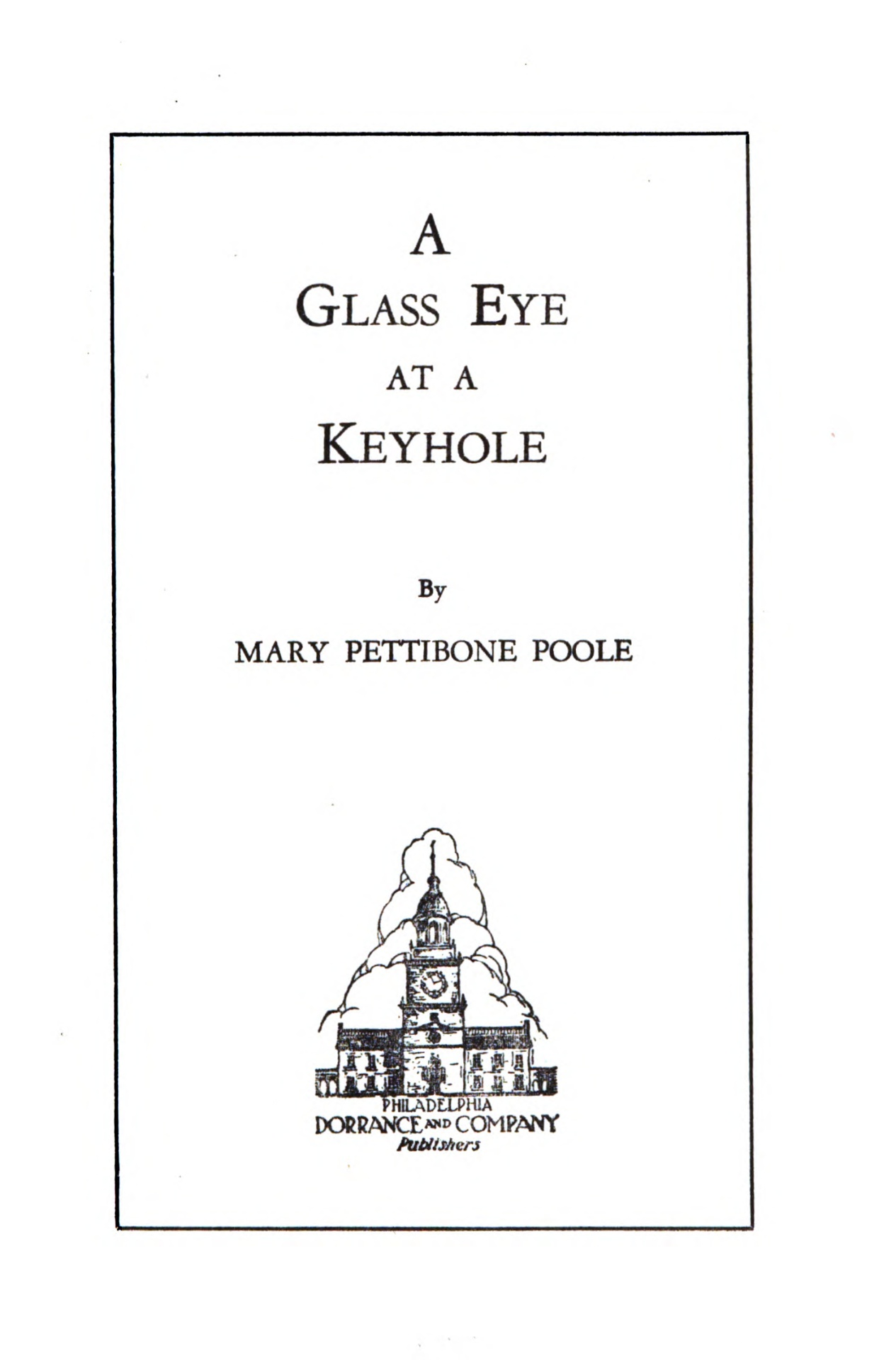
- Author: Mary Pettibone Poole
- Language: English
- Subject: Aphorisms and apothegms
- Publisher: Dorrance and Company
- Publication date: 1938
- Media type: Print
- Pages: 51 pages
- OCLC: 3403027

A Glass Eye at a Keyhole is an aphorism and apothegms-based book written by Mary Pettibone Poole in 1938.

== Reception ==
A contemporary review in the Fort Worth Star-Telegram said, "For those who must be satisfied with being next best to clever the little book offers all sorts of opportunities for quotations, if they are so fortunate as to have a good memory, and fancy the airily cynical manner in their quips."

A review in The Oklahoma News said that "it is just as clever as can be, made up entirely of pithy paragraphs that will make you smile, make you laugh, make you think."
