= Sir Henry Merrivale =

- First appearance: The Plague Court Murders (1934)
- Last appearance: The Cavalier's Cup (1953)
- Created by: Carter Dickson

In-universe information
- Nicknames: The Old Man, H. M., The Maestro
- Gender: Male
- Occupation: Government official, barrister
- Family: Kitty Bennett (sister)
- Spouse: Lady Merrivale
- Children: Two daughters
- Relatives: James Bennett (nephew)
- Nationality: British

Sir Henry Merrivale is a fictional amateur detective created by "Carter Dickson", a pen name of John Dickson Carr (1906–1977). Also known as "the Old Man," by his initials "H. M." (a pun on "His Majesty"), or "the Maestro", Merrivale appears in 22 of Carr's locked-room mysteries and "impossible crime" novels of the 1930s, 1940s, and 1950s, as well as in two short stories.

== Character ==
Merrivale is a fairly serious character in the early novels but becomes more of a comic figure in the later books, sometimes bordering on the grotesque. Much of the humor surrounding the character derives from his outbursts of temper and his absurdly colourful language. In many of the stories, he is accompanied by Chief Inspector Humphrey Masters of Scotland Yard, who is more down-to-earth by contrast.

When first introduced as a character, he is described as an older man nearing retirement. In later works, he talks explicitly about his age. In the 1940 novel And So to Murder, set in late 1939, Merrivale refers to himself as being almost 70. In the 1941 novel Seeing is Believing, while dictating his memoirs, he even gives his date of birth, February 6, 1871, which is consistent with his earlier comment. But his age becomes more ambiguous in subsequent novels. In the final books in the series, when he theoretically would be in his 80s, there's no indication that he has been slowed by the years.

He is a baronet and a barrister – in The Judas Window he actually appears for the defence in court in a murder case – and he holds a medical degree. He has a number of other talents, including stage magic, disguise and a vast knowledge of the history of crime.

Merrivale occasionally mentions his family — a wife, two daughters and (late in the series) two sons-in-law. With his characteristically comic gruffness, he is inclined to complain about the trouble these relations give him, but none of them appear in any of the books or stories.

Due to the nebulous government position he holds and his eccentric personality, he is thought to have been partially based on Winston Churchill.

== Appearances ==
1. The Plague Court Murders - 1934
2. The White Priory Murders - 1934
3. The Red Widow Murders - 1935
4. The Unicorn Murders - 1935
5. The Punch and Judy Murders - 1936 (UK title: The Magic Lantern Murders)
6. The Ten Teacups - 1937 (US title: The Peacock Feather Murders)
7. The Judas Window - 1938 (alternate US paperback title: The Crossbow Murder)
8. Death in Five Boxes - 1938
9. The Reader is Warned - 1939
10. And So To Murder - 1940
11. Murder in The Submarine Zone - 1940 (US title: Nine - And Death Makes Ten, also published as Murder in the Atlantic)
12. Seeing is Believing - 1941 (alternate UK paperback title: Cross of Murder)
13. The Gilded Man - 1942 (alternate US paperback title: Death and The Gilded Man)
14. She Died A Lady - 1943
15. He Wouldn't Kill Patience - 1944
16. The Curse of the Bronze Lamp - 1945 (UK title: Lord of the Sorcerers, 1946)
17. My Late Wives - 1946
18. The House in Goblin Wood - 1947 (short story)
19. The Skeleton in the Clock - 1948
20. A Graveyard To Let - 1949
21. Night at the Mocking Widow - 1950
22. Behind the Crimson Blind - 1952
23. The Cavalier's Cup - 1953

== In other media ==
HM appeared in "Death in the Dressing Room", an episode of the radio anthology series Murder Clinic. Roland Winters played the part.

And So to Murder and The Judas Window were adapted for the BBC anthology series Detective. Merrivale was played by Martin Wyldeck and David Horne respectively.

He Wouldn't Kill Patience was adapted for the BBC Home Service in 1959, with Felix Felton portraying Sir Henry.

The Judas Window was adapted as L'occhio di Giuda for the Italian RAI network in 1982. Adolfo Celi played Merrivale.

In Anthony Shaffer's play Sleuth, mystery writer Andrew Wyke's most famous character is an aristocratic detective named St. John, Lord Merridew. This character was inspired by Sir Henry Merrivale, and the character of Wyke was inspired by Carr.
