= The Secret Kingdom =

The Secret Kingdom may refer to:

- The Secret Kingdom (1916 film), an American film starring Charles Richman and Dorothy Kelly
- The Secret Kingdom (film), a 1925 British silent fantasy and science fiction film
- The Secret Kingdom (novel), a 1938 novel by Walter Greenwood
- The Secret Kingdom (TV series), a 1960 British television series based on the novel
- Das geheime Königreich (The Secret Kingdom), an opera by Ernst Krenek the premiered in 1928
- "Secret Kingdom", a song from the 1976 British musical The Slipper and the Rose
- The Secret Kingdom (children's book), 2018 book by Barb Rosenstock
