= Love on the Dole (disambiguation) =

Love on the Dole is a 1933 novel by Walter Greenwood, adapted into a play by Ronald Gow.

Love on the Dole may also refer to:

- Love on the Dole (film), a 1941 film adaptation starring Deborah Kerr and Clifford Evans
- "Love on the Dole", a song by The Libertines from Anthems for Doomed Youth
