= His Worship the Mayor =

1934 novel by Walter Greenwood

- First edition
- Author: Walter Greenwood
- Language: English
- Genre: Drama
- Publisher: Jonathan Cape
- Publication date: 1934
- Publication place: United Kingdom
- Media type: Print

His Worship the Mayor is a 1934 novel by the British writer Walter Greenwood. It was his second novel, following on from the success of his bestselling debut Love on the Dole the previous year. His new work drew on his experience as a Labour councillor, and focuses on corruption in local government a theme also addressed in Winifred Holtby’s South Riding. The novel features Sam Grundy, the bookmaker who had appeared in Love on the Dole.

It received positive reviews from critics including Harold Brighouse in The Guardian. In 1936 Greenwood adapted it into a play Give Us This Day.

== Synopsis ==
Edgar Hargreaves, a struggling tailor in Salford, suddenly comes into a sizable inheritance and enters local politics.

== Bibliography ==
- Hopkins, Chris. Walter Greenwood's Love on the Dole: Novel, Play, Film. Oxford University Press, 2018.
- Woods, Tim. Who's Who of Twentieth Century Novelists. Routledge, 2008.
