= Only Mugs Work =

1938 novel

- First edition
- Author: Walter Greenwood
- Language: English
- Genre: Crime drama
- Publisher: Hutchinson
- Publication date: 1938
- Publication place: United Kingdom
- Media type: Print

Only Mugs Work is a 1938 melodromatic crime novel by the British writer Walter Greenwood. Greenwood had established his reputation in 1933 with Love on the Dole, set in a district closely modelled on working-class Salford. In this case the setting is shifted to London's Soho, but features a similar blend of realism and drama. It is set amongst the spivs of the capital city. It was one of a number of novels that focused on the activities of the London underworld in the late 1930s including There Ain't No Justice, The House in Greek Street and Night and the City.

== Bibliography ==
- Hopkins, Chris. Walter Greenwood's Love on the Dole: Novel, Play, Film. Oxford University Press, 2018.
- Partridge, Eric. A Dictionary of the Underworld: British and American. Routledge, 2015.
- Walkowitz, Judith. Nights Out: Life in Cosmopolitan London. Yale University Press, 2012.
