= Nigel Stock (actor) =

British actor (1919–1986)

- Stock as Dr. Watson in BBC TV's Sherlock Holmes
- Born: 21 September 1919; Crown Colony of Malta
- Died: 22 June 1986 (aged 66); Camden, London, England
- Occupation: Actor
- Years active: 1931–1986
- Spouses: Catherine Hodnett (m. 1943; div. 1947) Sonia Williams (m. 1951; div. 1980) Richenda Carey (m. 1979)

Nigel Stock (21 September 1919 – 22 June 1986) was a British actor who played character roles in many films and television dramas. He played Dr. Watson in the BBC's television adaptations of the Sherlock Holmes stories between 1964 and 1968, and is known for his supporting roles as a solidly reliable English soldier or bureaucrat in several war and historical film dramas. He also played the title role in Owen, M.D. (1971—73), and Hoofd-commissaris Samson in Van der Valk. He appeared in noted films such as Brighton Rock, The Dam Busters, Victim and The Great Escape.

== Early life ==
Stock was born in Malta, the son of an Army captain. He grew up in India before attending St Paul's School, London and the Royal Academy of Dramatic Art, where he earned the Leverhulme Exhibition, Northcliffe Scholarship, and the Principal's Medal.

== Military service ==
Stock served in the Second World War with the London Irish Rifles and the Assam Regiment of the Indian Army in Burma, China and Kohima. He was honourably discharged with the rank of Major, having twice been mentioned in dispatches.

== Acting ==
Stock made his stage debut in 1931, and during his career achieved numerous classical and contemporary credits at various distinguished theatres, including the Old Vic and on Broadway, with productions of The Winter's Tale, Macbeth, She Stoops to Conquer, Uncle Vanya. His start in films came with uncredited bit parts in The Man Who Could Work Miracles (1938) and Goodbye, Mr. Chips (1939). In 1937 he made his first credited film appearance in Lancashire Luck.

After his wartime service, Stock returned to acting. His film appearances included popular releases such as Brighton Rock (1947), The Dam Busters (1955), Victim (1961), The Great Escape (1963), The Lion in Winter and The Lost Continent (both 1968), and Russian Roulette (1975).

Between 1964 and 1968, Stock became a household name in the UK for his portrayal of Dr. Watson in a series of Sherlock Holmes dramas for BBC television. Later in life, he portrayed the mentor of Sherlock Holmes in Young Sherlock Holmes. His other numerous television credits included Danger Man (1965), The Avengers (1964 & 1966), The Prisoner (1967), The Doctors (1969–71), Owen, M.D. (1971–73), Quiller (1975), Van der Valk (1977), the Doctor Who serial Time Flight (1982), Yes Minister (1982), Tinker Tailor Soldier Spy (1979) and for a BBC dramatisation of A Tale of Two Cities (1980) as well as The Pickwick Papers (1985) as Mr. Pickwick.

Stock and his third wife, Richenda Carey, had just appeared together on stage in the world premiere of Mumbo Jumbo in May 1986, when, on 23 June 1986, he died of a heart attack, aged 66.

== Personal life and death ==
Stock was married three times. He married his first wife, Catherine Hodnett, in 1943; the couple had one son and divorced in 1947. His second marriage was to Sonia Williams in 1951. They divorced in 1980 after having three children together. Stock's third marriage was to actress Richenda Carey in 1979. They remained married until his death.

Stock was found dead of natural causes on 22 June 1986 at his home in north London. He was 66 years old.

== Radio ==
- Giles Cooper - The return of General Forefinger (1961)
- Wimsey - Have His Carcase (BBC radio; 1981) as Inspector Umpelty
- Space Force (1984–85) as Magnus Carter
- 221B (1986) as Dr Watson

== Selected filmography ==
=== Film ===
Year	Title	Role	Notes
1936	The Man Who Could Work Miracles	Office Boy	uncredited
1937	Lancashire Luck	Joe Lovejoy	
1938	Break the News	Stage Boy	uncredited
1938	Luck of the Navy		uncredited
1939	Goodbye, Mr. Chips	John Forrester	uncredited
1939	Sons of the Sea	Rudd	
1947	It Always Rains on Sunday	Ted Edwards	
1947	Brighton Rock	Cubitt	
1951	The Lady with a Lamp	George Winch	
1952	Derby Day	Jim Molloy	
1953	Appointment in London	Co-Pilot	uncredited
1953	Malta Story	Giuseppe Gonzar aka Ricardi	
1954	Aunt Clara	Charles Willis	
1955	The Night My Number Came Up	The Pilot	
1955	The Dam Busters	Flying / Off. F. M. Spafford, D.F.C., D.F.M.	
1956	Eyewitness	Barney	
1956	The Battle of the River Plate	Chief Officer, Tairoa, Prisoner on Graf Spee	uncredited
1958	The Silent Enemy	Able Seaman Fraser	
1960	Never Let Go	Regan	
1961	Victim	Phip	
1962	H.M.S. Defiant	Senior Midshipman Kilpatrick	
1962	The Password Is Courage	Cole	
1963	The Great Escape	Flt. Lt. Dennis Cavendish "The Surveyor"	
1964	Nothing but the Best	Ferris	
1964	Weekend at Dunkirk	Un soldat brûlé	
1964	The High Bright Sun	Lt. Col. N. Park	
1967	The Night of the Generals	Otto	
1968	The Lost Continent	Dr. Webster	
1968	The Lion in Winter	William Marshal	
1970	Cromwell	Sir Edward Hyde	
1973	Bequest to the Nation	George Matcham	
1975	Russian Roulette	Ferguson	
1975	Operation Daybreak	General	
1980	The Mirror Crack'd	Inspector Gates	'Murder at Midnight'
1983	Yellowbeard	Admiral	
1985	Young Sherlock Holmes	Rupert T. Waxflatter	

=== Television ===
Year	Title	Role	Notes
1960	No Hiding Place	Sergeant Ward	Episode: "Trial and Error"
1960	Police Surgeon	Harry Davis	Episode: "Wilful Neglect"
1963	The Saint	Jim Chase	Episode: The Invisible Millionaire
1963	Edgar Wallace Mysteries	George Matthews	Episode: "To Have an to Hold"
1963	Lorna Doone	Jeremy Stickles	7 episodes
1964	Espionage	Harry Forbes	Episode: "Medal for a Turned Coat"
1964-6	The Avengers	Vladimir Petrov Sergeivitch Zalenko/Richard Carylon	2 episodes
1964-8	Sherlock Holmes	Dr. Watson	29 episodes
1965	Danger Man	Major Bert Barrington	Episode: "Loyalty Always Pays"
1966	Doctor Finlay's Casebook	General Hannon	Episode: "The General"
1966	Out of the Unknown	Charles Dennistoun	Episode: "Second Childhood"
1967	Adam Adamant Lives!	Oliver Meadows	Episode: "The Deadly Bullet"
1967	The Prisoner	The Colonel	Episode: "Do Not Forsake Me Oh My Darling"
1970	Doomwatch	Commander Charles Keeping	Episode: "Project Sahara"
1970-1	The Doctors	Dr. Thomas Owen	77 episodes
1971-3	Owen, M.D.	Dr. Thomas Owen	63 episodes
1972	Colditz	Gestapo Officer	Episode: "Name, Rank and Number"
1974	Fall of Eagles	General Alexeiev	Episode: "Tell the King the Sky is Falling"
1975	Churchill's People	General Howe	Episode: "Mutiny"
1975	The Main Chance	George Fisher	Episode: "When There's No Law"
1975	Quiller	Loman	2 episodes
1976	The Expert	Sir Charles Lamborey	Episode: "Inheritance"
1976	Softly, Softly: Task Force	Dr. Tadman	Episode: "Alarums and Excursions"
1977	Van der Valk	Samson	12 episodes
1979	Tinker Tailor Soldier Spy	Roddy Martindale	Episode: "Return to the Circus"
1980	A Tale of Two Cities	Jarvis Lorry	7 episodes
1980	The Good Companions	Robert Fauntley	Episode: "Supper at the Royal Standard"
1981	Triangle	Wally James	15 episodes
1981	Winston Churchill: The Wilderness Years	Admiral Domville	Episode: "His Own Funeral"
1981-2	Yes Minister	Sir Mark Spencer	2 episodes
1982	Doctor Who	Professor Hayter	Serial: "Time-Flight"
1985	The Pickwick Papers	Samuel Pickwick	Miniseries
1986	Unnatural Causes	The Rev Davidson	Episode: "Blood Hunt"
1987	Worlds Beyond	Clifford Barrington	Episode: "The Barrington Case"
1987	Knights of God	Brother Simon	7 episodes
