= Something in My Heart (novel) =

1944 novel

- First edition
- Author: Walter Greenwood
- Language: English
- Genre: Drama
- Publisher: Hutchinson
- Publication date: 1944
- Publication place: United Kingdom
- Media type: Print

Something in My Heart is a 1944 novel by the British writer Walter Greenwood. It is a loose sequel to his debut and best-known novel Love on the Dole, a 1933 work set in Salford at the height of the Great Depression. This book presented a more optimistic view of a potential postwar future that was absent in the despair in the original novel.

== Synopsis ==
The story opens in 1937 with Helen Oakroyd working in a textile mill while her two friends Harry and Taffy are both on the dole. When war breaks out with Nazi Germany in 1939 both enlist in the RAF.

== Bibliography ==
- Hopkins, Chris. Walter Greenwood's Love on the Dole: Novel, Play, Film. Oxford University Press, 2018.
