= Lanting =

Lanting may refer to:

- Frans Lanting a Dutch wildlife photographer, born in 1951
- Lanting, a surname of Dutch origin, patronymic from an old personal name, Latin Lanterus, of uncertain origin, perhaps Landher (see Lanthier (disambiguation)).
- The Orchid Pavilion (Lanting), scene of the Orchid Pavilion Gathering event, in 353
