= America-Italy Society of Philadelphia =

US non-profit organization

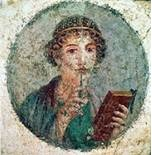
- AISPHILA logo (Depicting the Sappho Fresco)
- Abbreviation: AISPHILA
- Formation: 1956
- Founded at: Philadelphia, Pennsylvania
- Purpose: international friendship between the Republic of Italy and the United States of America.
- Headquarters: 230 South Broad Street, Suite 1105
- Location: Philadelphia, Pennsylvania, 19102
- Services: lectures, films, concerts, and language studies of the Italian culture and art
- Website: www.aisphila.org

The America-Italy Society of Philadelphia (AISPHILA) is a non-profit organization, founded in 1956 in Philadelphia, Pennsylvania, to promote, by educational and cultural means, an international friendship between the Republic of Italy and the United States. The organization offers a series of lectures, films, concerts, and language studies to promote a broader understanding of the Italian cultural and artistic heritage.

== History/Background ==
The America-Italy Society of Philadelphia was founded in 1956 largely through the creative and dynamic leadership of Dr. Giovanni Luciolli, who was Consul General of Italy of Philadelphia at that time with the help of the former president, John Price. Today, the organization has several hundred members in the greater Philadelphia region.

The AIS has been involved in several restoration projects over time. One of the earliest projects was CRIA (Committee to Rescue Italian Art), a committee that formed following the 1966 Flood of the Arno River, to rescue and restore artwork that was affected by the flood. The committee was composed of art historians, curators, and conservators. The AIS president, John Price, served as the Committee's Area Chair.

In 1980, following the earthquake that devastated many mountain villages east of Naples, the society funded and built a center for older citizens who had survived but lost everything.

== Programs ==
AISPHILA promotes a mutual understanding between Italian and American Culture through their many different programs:

=== Language School ===
AISPHILA offers 14 different levels of weekly Italian language classes, private lessons, and full-immersion courses ranging from beginner to fluent.

=== Lectures & Cultural Events ===
The America-Italy Society of Philadelphia arranges various events each year that educate its members on Italian history, language culture, art, and literature. AISPHILA hosts monthly films that are shown in Italian with English subtitles introduced by a guest lecturer.

=== Ente Gestore ===
As part of its mission to promote Italian culture and language, the America-Italy Society of Philadelphia acts as ente gestore (manager) of grants to public and private schools that offer Italian language instruction. With support from the Italian government and under the supervision of Dr. Domenico Teker, the Director of the Scholastic Office of the Consulate General of Italy in Boston, AIS promotes Italian language programs in high schools throughout the greater Philadelphia region.

=== Amerita Chamber Players/Concerts ===
AISPHILA sponsors a free concert series that is open to the public by the Amerita Chamber Players.

Amerita concerts are held three times a year at the Temple Beth Zion-Beth Israel at 18th and Spruce St. in Center City Philadelphia.

==== History of the Amerita Chamber Players ====
The America-Italy Society presented its first concert of the Amerita Chamber Players in 1956 at The Philadelphia Museum of Art, and their annual concerts of Italian Baroque music remain the Society's most popular event.

The Amerita Chamber Players was founded by Philadelphia Orchestra violinist, Frank Costanzo and then Consulate General of Italy in Philadelphia, Dr. Giovanni Luciolli. By merging the words "America" and "Italy", the name "Amerita" was born to represent the combination of the two different cultures.

What began as a small string orchestra is today, under the direction of harpsichordist Davyd Booth (who serves on the Board of Directors) and bassist-gambist Michael Shahan, an ensemble consisting of a string quintet and harpsichord with the addition of woodwinds or brass, vocal soloists, and other instrumentalists.

=== Trips to Italy ===
AISPHILA organizes annual group and individual trips to Italy. The immersion experiences provide an opportunity to study the language, attend food and wine tasting, and visit museums and local establishments.

=== Vittorini Awards ===
The America-Italy Society of Philadelphia supports excellence in Italian studies at the University of Pennsylvania with its Vittorini Fund, established in 1963 to honor the memory of Professor Domenico Vittorini, beloved long-time member of the Romance Languages Faculty at the University of Pennsylvania. Prizes are awarded each year to encourage undergraduate students in the pursuit of majors and minors, and perhaps even careers, centering on Italian culture.

The awards are presented by the America-Italy Society at an annual ceremony held at the end of the spring semester at the University of Pennsylvania.

== Restoration of Venetian Art ==
The America-Italy Society is an active member organization of the UNESCO International Committee for the Safeguarding of Venice and participates in saving and restoring Venetian Art and monuments.

The America-Italy Society began its support for art restoration in Venice following the great flood of 1966 that devastated Venice and damaged many of the world's great art and architectural masterpieces. The international community banded together under the United Nations Educational, Scientific and Cultural Organization (UNESCO) to launch a campaign to assist the Italian government in the safeguarding of Venice.

=== Restoration Projects Undertaken by AISPHILA ===
- Church of Santa Maria della Visitazione: 58 ceiling panels (Umbrian School, 15th century)
- Cà Rezzonico: Ballroom ceiling frescoes by Giambattista Crosato (18th century)
- Basilica Santa Maria Gloriosa dei Frari: The painting of the "Assumption of the Virgin" by Titian (16th century)
- Palazzo Mocenigo: Fresco of "The Apotheosis of the Mocenigo Family" by Jacopo Guarana (18th century)
- Basilica di Santa Maria Assunta, Torcello: Mosaics throughout the church interior (12th and 13th century)
- Ospedaletto dei Derelitti: Sala della Musica (18th century)
- The Church of San Martino: Altarpiece with four angels by Tullio Lombardo (16th century)
- San Michele in Isola: Three wooden statues (16th century)
- Flagpole dedicated to Doge Francesco Morosini in campo Santo Stefano

== Tax-exemption legitimacy ==
AISPHILA is a tax-exempt, nonprofit organization under Sections 501(c)(3) and 509 (a)(2) of the Internal Revenue Code. AISPHILA is registered as a charitable organization in the Commonwealth of Pennsylvania.
