= The Noisy Paint Box =

2014 children's picture book by Barb Rosenstock

- First edition cover, Alfred A. Knopf
- Author: Barb Rosenstock
- Illustrator: Mary GrandPré
- Language: English
- Genre: Children's picture book
- Publisher: Random House Children's Books
- Publication date: February 11, 2014
- Publication place: United States
- Pages: 40
- ISBN: 9780307978486

The Noisy Paint Box: The Colors and Sounds of Kandinsky’s Abstract Art is a 2014 children's picture book written by Barb Rosenstock and illustrated by Mary GrandPré. It tells the story of Russian-born abstract artist Vasily Kandinsky, "who is known for his abstract paintings with colorful geometric shapes and bold strokes". Kandinsky likely "experienced synesthesia, the neurological phenomenon that blurs the boundaries between the senses".

The Noisy Paint Box was awarded a Caldecott Honor in 2015.

== Reception ==
The Noisy Paint Box was well received by critics, including starred reviews from Booklist, Kirkus Reviews, Publishers Weekly, and School Library Journal.

Kirkus Reviews called it "a rich, accomplished piece about a pioneer in the art world."

Publishers Weekly highlighted how Rosenstock's "prose strikes a balance between lightheartedness and lyricism". Booklist's Maryann Owen similarly noted that "the rich word choice is a delight". Kathryn Diman, writing for School Library Journal, added that "Rosenstock's crisp visual language unites with GrandPré's deeply expressive and whimsical paintings to re-create the intriguing world of art as seen through Kandinsky's distinct lens."

Expanding on this, Erika Thulin Dawes discussed how "Grandpre ... employs vivid colors and sweeping lines to depict the blending of sight and sound that results from the artist’s synesthesia [...] Pallette changes from dark to bright parallel Kandinsky’s struggles to be true to and to advocate for his non-representational artistic style". Further, Publishers Weekly noted that GrandPré’s illustrations "conjure up an entire epoch, lingering over the candelabras and tasseled drapes of the Kandinskys’ apartment, breathing life into all the characters, and conveying the energy and vitality of the colors Kandinsky hears." However, Deborah Stevenson, writing for The Bulletin of the Center for Children's Books, noted that while "GrandPré’s acrylic illustrations [...] ably convey the gloomy respectability of young Vasya’s household [...], they’re not very successful at expressing his break with propriety". Stevenson added that "the layout, with its tidy borders and common font [...] has a stodgy conventionality at odds with its subject".

Discussing the book more generally, Stevenson noted that "the blend of fiction and nonfiction is a little confusing", but concluded that "the story of a young kid who wants to shake things up will appeal to many junior artists, and the details of Vasya’s sonic joy in color may inspire further artistic exploration".

On behalf of Language Arts, Holly Sims similarly concluded that "after reading this celebration of creativity and the importance of self-expression, readers will be eager to create their own musical works of art".

Sarah Harrison Smith, writing for The New York Times, also reviewed the book.

== Awards and honors ==
The Noisy Paint Box was a 2015 Caldecott Honor book. The Association for Library Service to Children also named it one of the year's Notable Children's Books.
