= Lantier =

Lantier can refer to:

- Lantier, Quebec, a municipality in Canada
- Étienne-François de Lantier (1734–1826)
- Jacques Philippe Lantier (1814–1882), a Canadian businessman, author and politician from Quebec
- Raymond Lantier (1886–1980), French archaeologist
- Pierre Lantier (1910–1998), a French composer and pianist

== See also ==
- Lanthier (disambiguation)
