= Standing Room Only (novel) =

1936 novel

- First edition
- Author: Walter Greenwood
- Language: English
- Genre: Comedy
- Publisher: Jonathan Cape
- Publication date: 1936
- Publication place: United Kingdom
- Media type: Print

Standing Room Only is a 1936 comedy novel by the British writer Walter Greenwood. It was his third novel. Like his previous two, including his bestselling debut Love on the Dole, the work is partly set in his native Salford. The novel was somewhat self-reflexive as the protagonist Henry Ormerod strongly resembles Greenwood's own background and experiences. It was not as critically well-received as his two previous novels.

== Synopsis ==
Henry Ormerod, a working-class draper's assistant, has ambitions to become a playwright which are mocked by both his mother and prospective wife Edna. However, his play unexpectedly generates interest from a theatrical producer who sees it as a perfect vehicle for a female star, leading to one his rivals to outbid him and buy the rights to the work. Ormerod travels south to London's West End, but finds he has lost all financial and artistic control over his work. Abandoning his romantic pursuit of the actress Dilys Richmond, he flees back to the north. However the play is a huge hit and the royalties allow him to buy a large house in the suburbs, now married to Edna. To his alarm, he finds he has no ideas for any further plays and is likely to remain a one-hit wonder.

== Bibliography ==
- Hopkins, Chris. Walter Greenwood's Love on the Dole: Novel, Play, Film. Oxford University Press, 2018.
- Russell, Dave. Looking North: Northern England and the National Imagination. Manchester University Press, 2004.
