= So Brief the Spring =

1952 novel

- First edition
- Author: Walter Greenwood
- Language: English
- Genre: Drama
- Publisher: Hutchinson
- Publication date: 1952
- Publication place: United Kingdom
- Media type: Print
- Followed by: What Everybody Wants

So Brief the Spring is a 1952 novel by the British writer Walter Greenwood. It is the first in the author's trilogy set in the fictional fishing port of Treeloe in Cornwall. It was developed out of a play which Greenwood had written in 1945. The novel is dedicated to Robert Newton who appeared in the play. It focuses on Randy Jollifer, formerly of the Royal Navy, attempting to settle down to postwar life in his home town. The book and its sequels sold steadily, without enjoying the spectacular popularity of his best-known work Love on the Dole.

== Synopsis ==
Jollifer earns a modest living as a fisherman and taking tourists out for trips on his boat. He encounters Ann Halstead down on a holiday from London. While there is a certain attraction between them, she is drawn to the family manor house owned by Jollifer's father, who has disinherited his son during the war. Ann becomes engaged to Jollifer senior. After he suffers a heart attack, an accidental fire started by relatives searching for the hidden gold sovereigns that the miserly older man has stashed due to his profiteering during the war, burns down much of the house. Ann ultimately marries another local man, a doctor while Jollifer inherits the ruined manor house.

== Bibliography ==
- Hopkins, Chris. Walter Greenwood's Love on the Dole: Novel, Play, Film. Oxford University Press, 2018.
- Woods, Tim. Who's Who of Twentieth Century Novelists. Routledge, 2008.
