= "Sappho" fresco (Pompeii) =

1st-century Pompeiian fresco

- Also known as "Portrait of a Young Woman with Stylus"
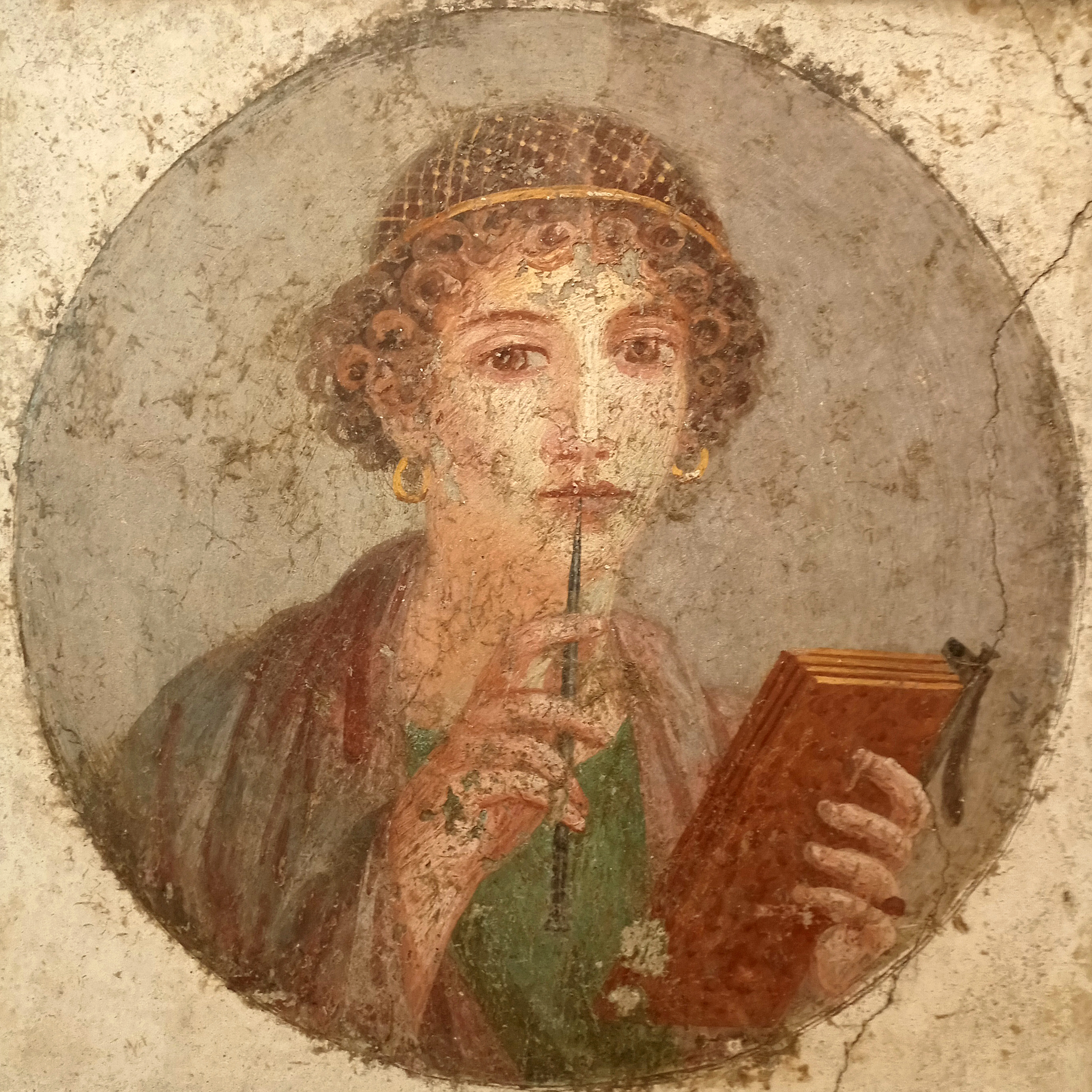
- Type: Fresco in the Fourth Pompeiian Style
- Size: 37 cm × 38 cm (15 in × 15 in)
- Created: c. 50 – c. 79 AD
- Discovered: 17 May 1760; Pompeii, Kingdom of Naples
- Present location: National Archaeological Museum of Naples, Italy
- Registration: 9084

The "Sappho" fresco or Portrait of a Young Woman with Stylus is a fresco dating to the 1st century AD from the city of Pompeii, which was buried during the eruption of Mount Vesuvius in 79 AD. It depicts a finely dressed young woman with a writing tablet and stylus, used in Roman painting to indicate literacy and education. The fresco is ascribed to the Fourth Style of Pompeiian painting and was recovered on 17 May 1760, in a house in the north-west of the city. It is displayed at the National Archaeological Museum, Naples.

The portrait was speculatively identified as a depiction of the Greek poet Sappho in the nineteenth century, though no corroborating evidence for this suggestion exists. Most modern scholars treat it as a portrait of an educated, upper-class Pompeiian woman, though it has also been conjectured to be a representation of the Flavian satirist Sulpicia, who was active in the final quarter of the first century AD.

The fresco was one of a number of artworks discovered at Pompeii between 1750 and 1760 which were speculatively identified as depictions of Sappho. These sparked renewed interest in the poet in European literature. The fresco was an important influence on the Chinese poet Shao Xunmei, who was inspired to take up poetry after seeing it on a visit to Naples in the early 1920s, and may also have influenced the American performance artist Eva Palmer.

== Description ==
The fresco is dated to the third quarter of the 1st century AD. (Note: Pompeii was destroyed by the eruption of Vesuvius in 79 AD, providing a terminus ante quem for the painting.) It depicts a woman, with brown hair, holding the type of writing tablet and stylus used by Romans during the 1st century AD. Her clothing and hairstyle closely reflect mid-century fashions, and include a golden hairnet and large golden earrings. The hairnet and tightly curled hairstyle were both characteristic of fashion under the reign of Nero (r. 54–68) and the early Flavian period that followed. (Note: Bettina Bergmann describes the hairstyle as being "late Julio-Claudian".) It is considered part of the Fourth Style of Pompeian wall-painting.

Map of the excavations of Pompeii, showing the regiones and insulae as defined by modern archaeologists. Regio VI and the Insula Occidentalis are in the north-west, to the left of the image.

The art historian Roger Ling considers the portrait likely to be a generic representation: a "rather bland form of classicising beauty" similar to idealised portrait busts of women from earlier periods. The subject holds a stylus in her right hand and rests its tip on her lips. The archaeologist Amedeo Maiuri describes the painting as "almost academically formal", and the subject's appearance as "refreshingly schoolgirlish". The fresco embodies the literary and artistic trope of the docta puella ("learned girl"). Writing tablets in Pompeiian portraits often functioned as symbols of education and literacy, and other frescoes show women with writing tablets in contexts that suggest commercial record-keeping. Since only a minority of the Roman population was literate, images of the docta puella type were used by wealthy families to indicate their education and corresponding social status. According to Mauri, the subject's delicate features and tranquil gaze were intended to convey aristocratic breeding, while the writing implements serve as "but a pretext for a high-romantic pose". The classicist Renate Johne has used images of this type to argue that women played an important role as readers, and perhaps as pseudonymous authors, of ancient novels.

Modern archaeologists divide Pompeii into regiones ("regions") and insulae ("blocks"), the latter referring to blocks of buildings divided from each other by the city's streets. The fresco was found in a house in the Insula Occidentalis ("Western insula") of Regio VI, in the north-west of the city. It was originally displayed adjacent to an image of a young man, holding a scroll, which faced it across a square panel depicting the hero Perseus seated and holding the head of Medusa over himself and his lover Andromeda. The "Sappho" head was painted on the same side as that of Andromeda, while the young man's was on the same side as that of Perseus; the classicist Bettina Bergmann suggests that this was intended to draw the viewer's gaze towards the centre of the composition, which showed Medusa's head, which was believed to be able to turn viewers into stone.

=== Subject ===
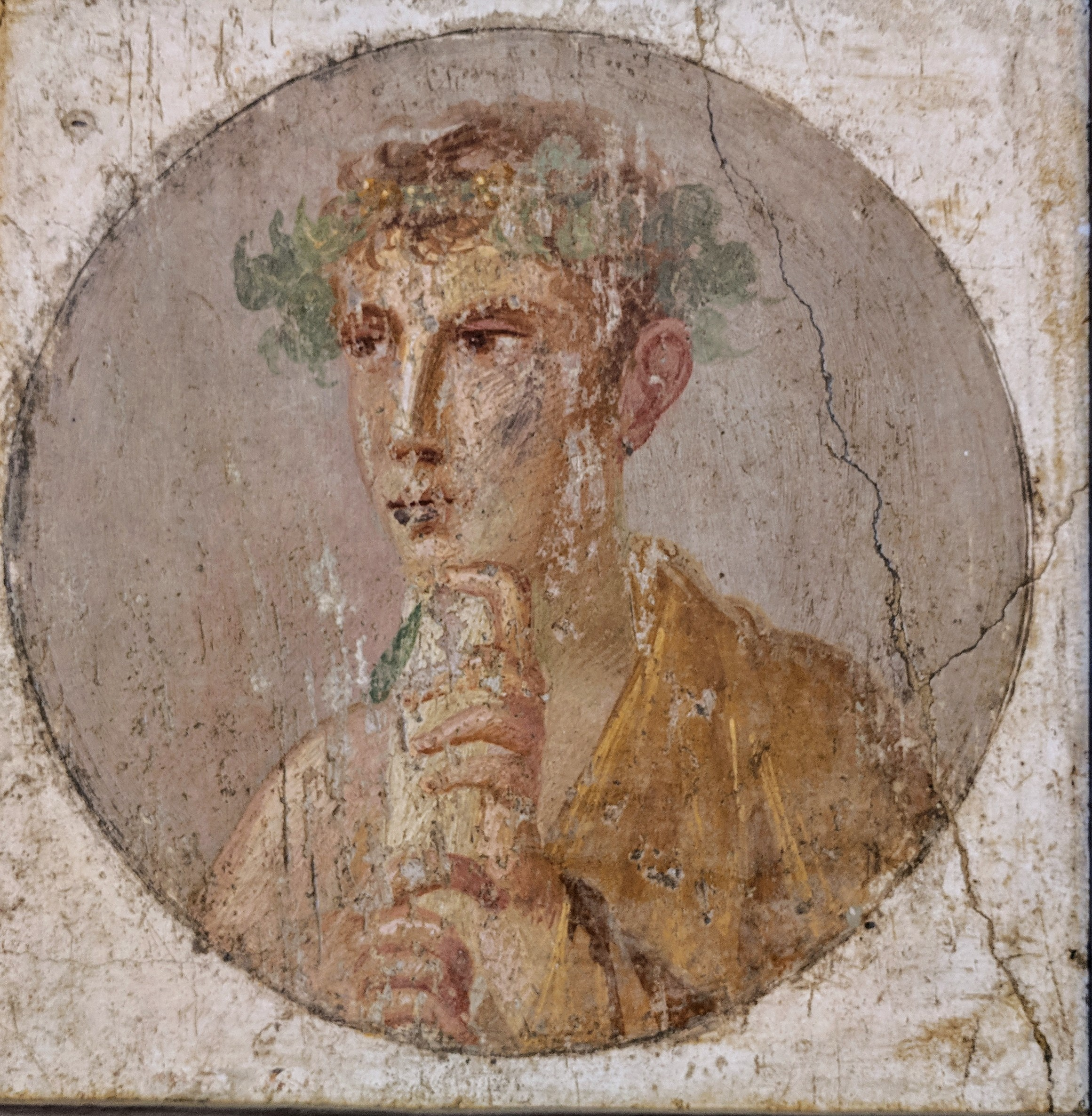
The portrait of a young man originally displayed alongside the fresco

During the 19th century, scholars speculated that the subject of the portrait was Sappho of Lesbos, an Ancient Greek poet active during the seventh and sixth centuries BC. This connection lent fame to the work. However, there is no label identifying the portrait as Sappho, and modern scholars now generally treat the portrait as that of an educated, upper-class Pompeiian woman. Another Pompeiian painting, showing a marriage scene and from the Villa Imperiale, includes a figure sometimes identified as Sappho.

Until the later twentieth century, roundel portraits such as the "Sappho" fresco were often considered purely decorative, with scholars generally discounting the suggestion that they may portray specific individuals. More recent studies have judged that Pompeiian painters used life models for their works, though it is usually difficult to discern which individuals are portrayed in specific works, and that roundel portraits could fill various roles, including as religious images and to signify the domestic nature of a space. The art historian Susan Silberberg-Peirce has suggested that it could represent the Flavian satirist Sulpicia, and that the portrait of a young man found nearby would therefore represent Calenus, her husband.

== Excavation and display ==
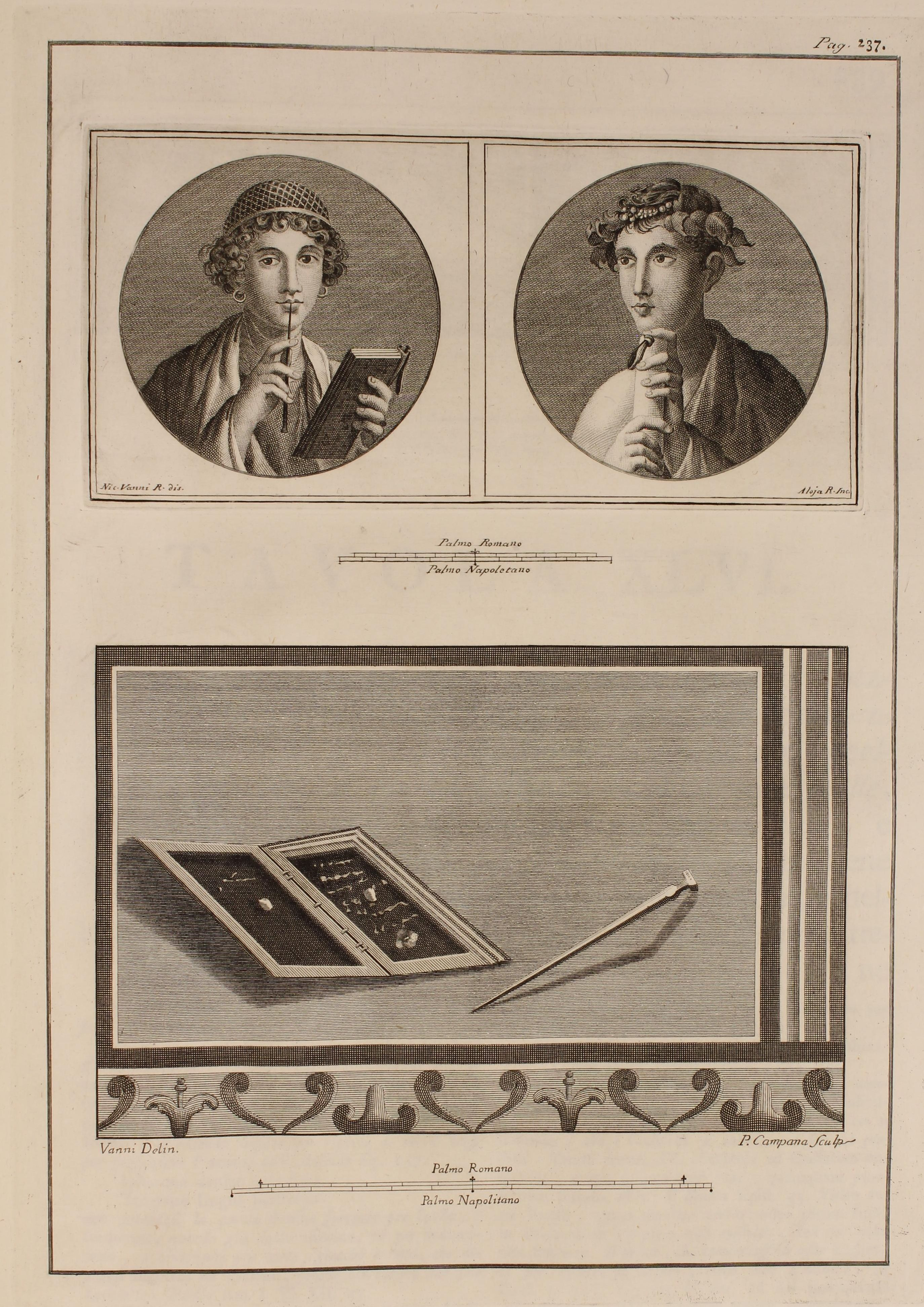
Excavation report of the mural, Naples Royal Printing House (1762)

The first major excavations in Pompeii began in 1748. This fresco was uncovered on 17 May 1760 in a house on land belonging to the local Cuomo family. Alongside it was a central panel depicting the myth of Andromeda and Perseus; the side panels contained the "Sappho" fresco paired with the pendant medallion of a young man clutching a scroll. It was removed from the walls of the original house, a common practice prior to the site's opening to the public in 1764, when ornamental pieces were often extracted for collections. Some of the other frescoes found near it were destroyed, and others were sold to private collectors.

The "Sappho" fresco currently resides at the National Archaeological Museum of Naples. In 1974, it was placed on display alongside fragments of other frescoes found nearby by the curator Agnes Allroggen-Bedel, reconstructing one wall of the original building. In 2022, it was exhibited in Japan at the Tokyo National Museum.

== Legacy ==
The Chinese poet Shao Xunmei saw the "Sappho" fresco during a visit to Naples in the early 1920s; in the words of the literary scholar Jingling Chen, the experience made him "the most passionate admirer of Sappho in modern China". Shao began writing poetry following his visit, and often imitated of Sappho's works, which he read in English translation. His output included a 1925 poem titled "Sappho" and dedicated to her.

The American actress, artist and Hellenist Eva Palmer probably saw the painting during a year spent in Europe between 1898 and 1899: she subsequently performed a tableau vivant themed around Sappho in a 1900 variety show in Bar Harbor, Maine. The classicist Margaret Reynolds credits the "Sappho" fresco, along with a bust, a statue and a mosaic – all found at Pompeii in the 1750s and all equally speculatively identified as images of the poet – with inspiring the Italian poet Vincenzo Imperiale's La Faoniade: Inni ed Odi di Saffo ("The Faoniad: Hymns and Odes of Sappho"), which spuriously claimed to be a translation of a lost work of hers. She also considers these artworks an inspiration for the French writer Étienne-François de Lantier's 1798 Voyages d’Anténor en Grèce et en Asie ("Voyages of Antenor in Greece and in Asia"), in which the title character meets Sappho on the day of her death by suicide.

== Footnotes ==
=== Bibliography ===
- Amery, Colin; Curran, Brian (2002). The Lost World of Pompeii. Los Angeles: J. Paul Getty Museum. p. 144. ISBN 0-89236-687-7.
- Bergmann, Bettina (2018). "At Face Value: Painted Ladies on Pompeian Walls". In Longfellow, Brenda; Perry, Ellen (eds.). Roman Artists, Patrons, & Public Consumption: Familiar Works Reconsidered. Ann Arbor: University of Michigan Press. pp. 142–165. ISBN 978-0-472-13065-8.
- Bragantini, Irene; Sampaolo, Valeria (2009). La pittura pompeiana [Pompeian Painting]. Electa, Soprintendenza archeologica Napoli e Pompei. ISBN 978-88-510-0575-7.
- Chen, Jingling (2021). "Sappho in China and Japan". In Finglass, P. J.; Kelly, Adrian (eds.). The Cambridge Companion to Sappho. Cambridge University Press. pp. 473–486. ISBN 978-1-316-63877-4.
- Cooley, Alison (2023). Pompeii. London: Bloomsbury. ISBN 978-1-350-12524-7.
- Johne, Renate (2003). "Women in the Ancient Novel". In Schmeling, Gareth L. (ed.). The Novel in the Ancient World (Revised ed.). Leiden: Brill. pp. 151–207. ISBN 0-391-04134-7.
- Leontis, Artemis (2019). Eva Palmer Sikelianos: A Life in Ruins. Princeton University Press. ISBN 978-0-691-21076-6.
- Lessing, Erich; Varone, Antonio (1996). Pompeii. Paris: Terrail. ISBN 2-87939-007-9.
- Ling, Roger (1991). Roman Painting. Cambridge University Press. ISBN 0-521-30614-0 – via Internet Archive.
- Maiuri, Amedeo (1953). Roman Painting. New York: Skira. pp. 99–100. OCLC 1036938967 – via Internet Archive.
- Milnor, Kristina (2014). Graffiti and the Literary Landscape in Roman Pompeii. Oxford University Press. doi:10.1093/acprof:oso/9780199684618.001.0001. ISBN 978-0-19-176504-9.
- Moormann, E. M. (1987). "Destruction and Restoration of Campanian Mural Paintings in the Eighteenth and Nineteenth Centuries". In S. Cather (ed.). The Conservation of Wall Paintings (PDF). pp. 87–101. Archived from the original (PDF) on 11 December 2025.
- Reynolds, Margaret (2010). The Sappho Companion. London: Random House. ISBN 978-1-4464-1376-0.
- Silberberg-Peirce, Susan (1993). "The Muse Restored: Images of Women in Roman Painting". Woman's Art Journal. 14 (2): 28–36. doi:10.2307/1358447. ISSN 0270-7993. JSTOR 1358447.
- Wasdin, Katherine (2018). Eros at Dusk: Ancient Wedding and Love Poetry. Oxford University Press. p. 200. ISBN 978-0-19-086909-0.
- Verbanck-Piérard, Annie (2025). "To Write and Read, Count and Record, Certify and Attest: The Multiple Functions of Tablets in Greek and Roman Antiquity". In Hartoch, Else (ed.). The Writing Tablets of Roman Tongeren (Belgium) and Associated Wooden Finds. Turnhout: Brepols Publishers. pp. 71–100. ISBN 978-2-503-61687-2. JSTOR jj.47367694.10.
