= Down by the Sea =

1956 novel by William Greenwood

- First edition
- Author: Walter Greenwood
- Language: English
- Genre: Drama
- Publisher: Hutchinson
- Publication date: 1956
- Publication place: United Kingdom
- Media type: Print
- Preceded by: What Everybody Wants

Down by the Sea is a 1956 novel by the British writer Walter Greenwood. It is the final entry of a trilogy set in the fictional fishing port of Treeloe in Cornwall. Durrall, the principal protagonist of the previous novel marries a woman and is able to prosper by opening his cottage as a tea house for tourists.

It was his penultimate published novel, followed by the Manchester-set Saturday Night at the Crown in 1959.

== Bibliography ==
- Hopkins, Chris. Walter Greenwood's Love on the Dole: Novel, Play, Film. Oxford University Press, 2018.
- Woods, Tim. Who's Who of Twentieth Century Novelists. Routledge, 2008.
