= What Everybody Wants =

1954 novel

- First edition
- Author: Walter Greenwood
- Language: English
- Genre: Drama
- Publisher: Hutchinson
- Publication date: 1954
- Publication place: United Kingdom
- Media type: Print
- Preceded by: So Brief the Spring
- Followed by: Down by the Sea

What Everybody Wants is a 1954 novel by the British writer Walter Greenwood. It is the second of a trilogy set in the fictional fishing port of Treeloe in Cornwall during the postwar years. While the principal character of the first novel Randy Jollifer reappears, there is a shift to focus on the life of Darky Durrant. Durrant is a local poacher of gypsy heritage who, despite a distinguished war record as a commando, lives on the margins of society.

== Bibliography ==
- Hopkins, Chris. Walter Greenwood's Love on the Dole: Novel, Play, Film. Oxford University Press, 2018.
