= Saturday Night at the Crown =

1959 novel

- First edition
- Author: Walter Greenwood
- Language: English
- Genre: Drama
- Publisher: Hutchinson
- Publication date: 1959
- Publication place: United Kingdom
- Media type: Print

Saturday Night at the Crown is a 1959 novel by the British writer Walter Greenwood. It was his final novel, inspired by his 1954 play of the same title. The play had premiered in Morecambe in 1954 before running for 234 performances at the Garrick Theatre in London's West End from 1957 to 1958. He dedicated to the novel to Thora Hird who had starred in the play.

It takes place in a working class Manchester pub over a single day and evening focusing particularly on the landlord Harry Boothroyd, barmaid Sally Earnshaw and the domineering Ada Thorpe and her family. While set in a similar urban community as his most famous work Love on the Dole, the setting reflects the growing prosperity of the postwar economic boom rather than the Great Depression of the earlier era.

== Bibliography ==
- Hopkins, Chris. Walter Greenwood's Love on the Dole: Novel, Play, Film. Oxford University Press, 2018.
- Wearing, J.P. The London Stage 1950-1959: A Calendar of Productions, Performers, and Personnel. Rowman & Littlefield, 2014.
