= Wendy Hiller =

English stage and film actress (1912–2003)

Dame Wendy Hiller DBE
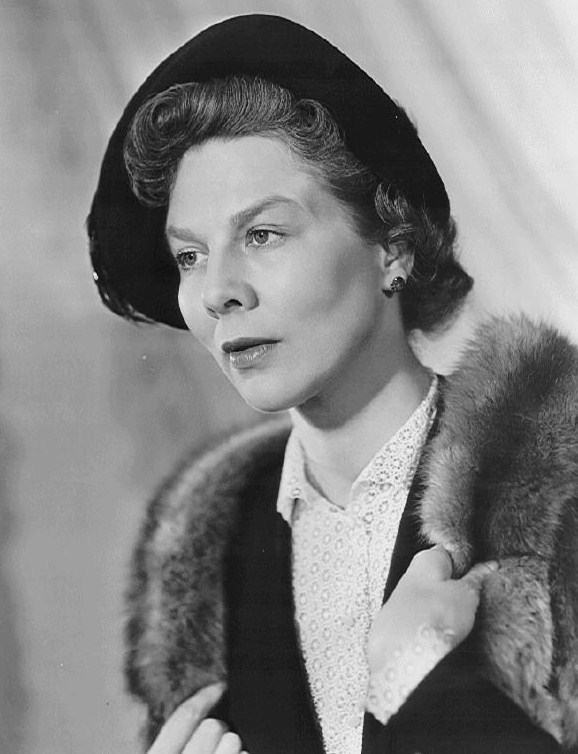
- Hiller in Sailor of the King (1953)
- Born: Wendy Margaret Hiller; 15 August 1912; Bramhall, Cheshire, England
- Died: 14 May 2003 (aged 90); Beaconsfield, Buckinghamshire, England
- Resting place: St Mary Churchyard, Radnage, Buckinghamshire, England
- Occupation: Actress
- Years active: 1935–1993
- Spouse: Ronald Gow (m. 1937; died 1993)

Dame Wendy Margaret Hiller (15 August 1912 – 14 May 2003) was an English film and stage actress who enjoyed a varied acting career that spanned nearly 60 years. Writer Joel Hirschorn, in his 1984 compilation Rating the Movie Stars, described her as "a no-nonsense actress who literally took command of the screen whenever she appeared on film". Despite many notable film performances, Hiller chose to remain primarily a stage actress.

Hiller earned Academy Award nominations for her performances in Pygmalion (1938), Separate Tables (1958), and A Man for All Seasons (1966), winning Best Supporting Actress for Separate Tables. She also was nominated for two BAFTA Awards, two Golden Globe Awards, a Tony Award, and a Laurence Olivier Award.

== Early life ==
Born in Bramhall, Cheshire, the daughter of Frank Watkin Hiller, a Manchester cotton manufacturer, and Marie Stone, she was educated at Winceby House School for Girls, Bexhill and Oriel Bank High School and at age 18 joined the Manchester Repertory Company, for which she acted and stage-managed for several years. She first found success as slum dweller Sally Hardcastle in the stage version of Love on the Dole in 1934. The play was an enormous success and toured the regional theatres of Britain, with Hiller making her West End debut in the play in 1935 at the Garrick Theatre. In 1937, she married the play's author Ronald Gow, 15 years her senior. That same year, she made her film debut in Lancashire Luck, scripted by Gow.

== Career ==
=== Stage ===
The huge popularity of Love on the Dole took the production to New York in 1936, where Hiller's performance attracted the attention of George Bernard Shaw. Shaw recognised a spirited radiance in the young actress, which was ideally suited for playing his heroines. Shaw cast her in several of his plays, including Saint Joan, Pygmalion and Major Barbara, and his influence on her early career is clearly apparent. She was reputed to be Shaw's favourite actress of the time. Unlike other stage actresses of her generation, she performed in relatively few Shakespeare productions, preferring the more modern dramatists such as Henrik Ibsen and new plays adapted from the novels of Henry James and Thomas Hardy, among others.

In the course of her stage career, Hiller won popular and critical acclaim in both London and New York. She excelled at rather plain but strong-willed characters. After touring Britain as Viola in Twelfth Night (1943), she returned to the West End to be directed by John Gielgud as Sister Joanna in The Cradle Song (Apollo, 1944). The string of notable successes continued as Princess Charlotte in The First Gentleman (Savoy, 1945) opposite Robert Morley as the Prince Regent, Pegeen in Playboy of the Western World (Bristol Old Vic, 1946) and Tess of the d'Urbervilles (Bristol Old Vic, 1946, transferring to the Piccadilly Theatre in the West End in 1947), which was adapted for the stage by her husband.

In 1947, Hiller originated the role of Catherine Sloper, the painfully shy, vulnerable spinster in The Heiress on Broadway. The play, based on the Henry James novel Washington Square, also featured Basil Rathbone as her emotionally abusive father. The production enjoyed a year-long run at the Biltmore Theatre in New York and would prove to be her greatest triumph on Broadway. On returning to London, Hiller again played the role in the West End production in 1950.

Her stage work remained a priority and continued with Ann Veronica (Piccadilly, 1949), which was adapted by Gow from the novel by H. G. Wells with his wife in the leading role. She performed in a two-year run of N. C. Hunter's Waters of the Moon (Haymarket, 1951–53) alongside Sybil Thorndike and Edith Evans. At the Old Vic for the 1955–56 season, Hiller contributed a notable performance as Portia in Julius Caesar, among others, including as Helen of Troy in Troilus and Cressida. Other stage work at this time included The Night of the Ball (New Theatre, 1955), the new Robert Bolt play Flowering Cherry (Haymarket, 1958, Broadway, 1959), Toys in the Attic (Piccadilly, 1960), The Wings of the Dove (Lyric, 1963), A Measure of Cruelty (Birmingham Repertory, 1965), A Present for the Past (Edinburgh, 1966), The Sacred Flame (Duke of York's, 1967) with Gladys Cooper, The Battle of Shrivings (Lyric, 1970) with John Gielgud and Lies (Albery, 1975).

In 1957, Hiller returned to New York to star as Josie Hogan in Eugene O'Neill's A Moon for the Misbegotten, a performance that gained her a Tony Award nomination as Best Dramatic Actress. The production also featured Cyril Cusack and Franchot Tone. Her final appearance on Broadway was as Miss Tina in the 1962 production of Michael Redgrave's adaptation of The Aspern Papers from the Henry James novella.

As Hiller matured, she demonstrated a strong affinity for the plays of Henrik Ibsen, as Irene in When We Dead Awaken (Cambridge, 1968), as Mrs. Alving in Ghosts (Edinburgh, 1972), Ase in Peer Gynt (BBC, 1972) and as Gunhild in John Gabriel Borkman (National Theatre Company, Old Vic, 1975), in which she appeared with Ralph Richardson and Peggy Ashcroft. Later West End successes such as Queen Mary in Crown Matrimonial (Haymarket, 1972) proved that she was not limited to playing dejected, emotionally deprived women. She later revisited some earlier plays playing older characters, as in West End revivals of Waters of the Moon (Chichester, 1977, Haymarket, 1978) with Ingrid Bergman and The Aspern Papers (Haymarket, 1984) with Vanessa Redgrave. She was scheduled to return to the American stage in a 1982 revival of Anastasia with Natalie Wood, but Wood died just weeks before rehearsals. Hiller made her final West End performance in the title role in Driving Miss Daisy (Apollo, 1988).

=== Film ===
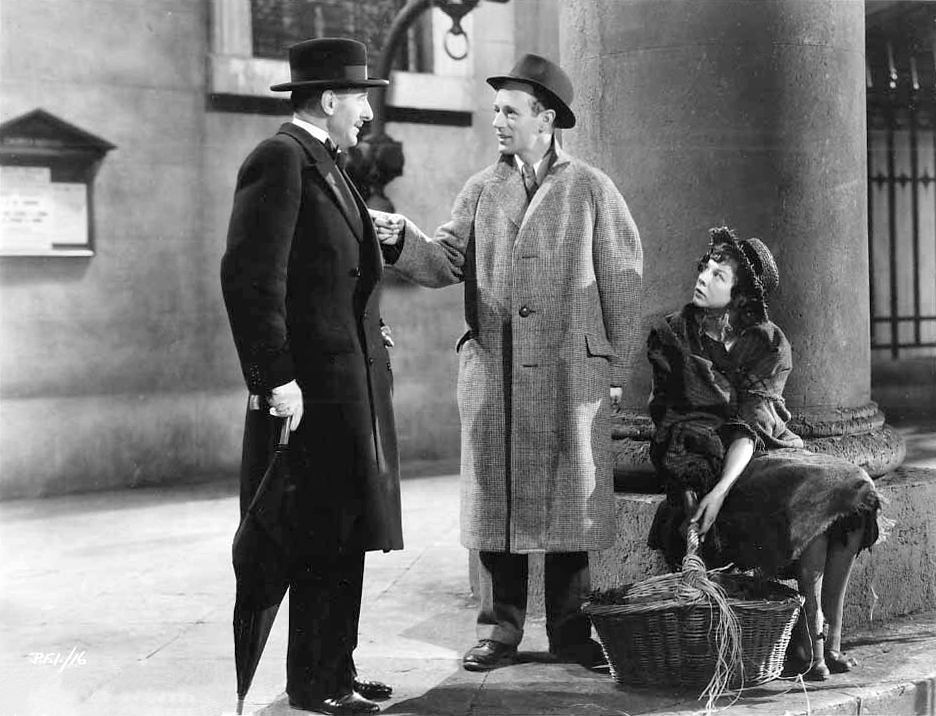
Scott Sunderland, Leslie Howard and Wendy Hiller in Pygmalion (1938)

At Shaw's insistence, she starred as Eliza Doolittle in the film Pygmalion (1938) with Leslie Howard as Professor Higgins. This performance earned Hiller her first Oscar nomination, a first for a British actress in a British film, and became one of her best-remembered roles. She was also the first actress to utter the word "bloody" in a British film, when Eliza utters the line "Not bloody likely, I'm going in a taxi!"

Hiller followed up this success with another Shaw adaptation, Major Barbara (1941) with Rex Harrison and Robert Morley. Powell and Pressburger signed her for The Life and Death of Colonel Blimp (1943), but her second pregnancy forced her to bow out in favor of Deborah Kerr. Determined to work with Hiller, the filmmakers later cast her with Roger Livesey again for I Know Where I'm Going! (1945), another classic of British cinema.

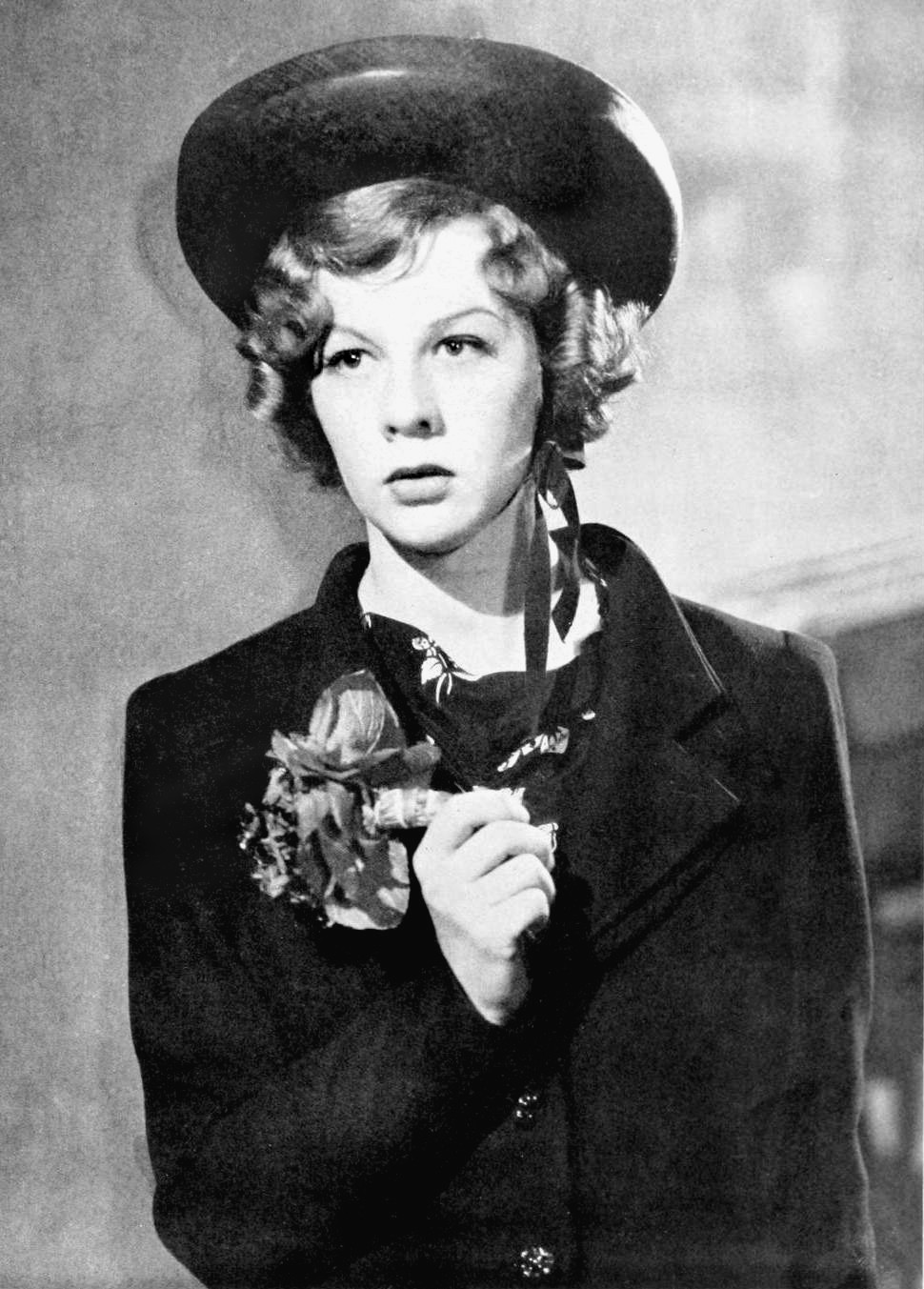
Hiller, c. 1938

Despite her early film success and offers from Hollywood, she returned to the stage full-time after 1945 and only occasionally accepted film roles. With her return to film in the 1950s, she portrayed an abused colonial wife in Carol Reed's Outcast of the Islands (1952), but had already transitioned into mature, supporting roles with Sailor of the King (1953) and as a memorable victim of the Mau Mau uprising in Something of Value (1957). She won the Oscar for Best Supporting Actress in 1959 for the film Separate Tables (1958) as a lonely hotel manager and mistress of Burt Lancaster. She remained uncompromising in her indifference to film stardom, as evidenced by her surprising reaction to her Oscar win: "Never mind the honour, cold hard cash is what it means to me." She received a BAFTA nomination as Best Supporting Actress for her portrayal of the domineering, possessive mother in Sons and Lovers (1960). She reprised her London stage role in the Southern Gothic Toys in the Attic (1963), which earned her a Golden Globe nomination as the elder spinster sister in a film that also stars Dean Martin and Geraldine Page.

Hiller received a third Oscar nomination for her performance as the simple, unrefined but dignified Lady Alice More, opposite Paul Scofield as Thomas More, in A Man for All Seasons (1966). Her role as the grand Russian princess in a great commercial success, Murder on the Orient Express (1974), won her international acclaim and the Evening Standard British Film Award as Best Actress. Other notable roles included a Jewish refugee fleeing Nazi Germany with her dying husband in Voyage of the Damned (1976), the formidable London Hospital matron in The Elephant Man (1980) and Maggie Smith's emotionally cold and demanding aunt in The Lonely Passion of Judith Hearne (1987).

=== Television ===
Hiller made numerous television appearances, in both Britain and the United States. In the 1950s and 1960s, she performed in episodes of American drama series such as Studio One and Alfred Hitchcock Presents, among others. In 1965, she starred in an episode of the acclaimed dramatic series Profiles in Courage (1965), in which she played Anne Hutchinson, a free-thinking woman charged with heresy in Colonial America. In Britain during the 1960s, Hiller gained critical acclaim for a guest appearance in a 1964 episode of the police drama Z-Cars, appeared in the drama series Play of the Month, and in 1965 was the narrator for five episodes of the BBC children's television programme Jackanory, reading the stories of Alison Uttley.

Throughout the 1970s and 1980s, she appeared in many television films including a memorable Duchess of York in the BBC Television Shakespeare production of Richard II (1978), the irascible Edwardian Oxford academic in Miss Morison's Ghosts (1981) and the BBC dramatisations of Julian Gloag's Only Yesterday (1986) and the Vita Sackville-West novel All Passion Spent (1986), in which she was the quietly defiant Lady Slane. This performance earned her a BAFTA nomination as Best Actress. Her last appearance before retiring from acting was the title role in The Countess Alice (1992), a BBC/WGBH-Boston television film with Zoë Wanamaker.

== Personal life ==
Hiller in later years

In the early 1940s, Hiller and husband Ronald Gow moved to Beaconsfield, Buckinghamshire, where they brought up two children, Ann (1939–2006) and Anthony (b. 1942), and lived together in the house called "Spindles" (now demolished). Ronald Gow died in 1993, but Hiller continued living at their home until her death a decade later. When not performing on stage or screen, she lived a completely private domestic life, insisting on being referred to as Mrs. Gow rather than by her stage name.

Regarded as one of Britain's great dramatic talents, she was made an Officer of the Order of the British Empire (OBE) in 1971 and raised to Dame Commander (DBE) in 1975.

In 1984 she was awarded an honorary doctorate from the University of Manchester. In 1996, Hiller was honoured by the London Film Critics Circle with the Dilys Powell Award for excellence in British film. Her style was disciplined and unpretentious, and she disliked personal publicity. The writer Sheridan Morley described Hiller as being remarkable in her "extreme untheatricality until the house lights went down, whereupon she would deliver a performance of breathtaking reality and expertise."

Despite a busy professional career, throughout her life she continually took an active interest in aspiring young actors by supporting local amateur drama societies, as well as being the president of the Chiltern Shakespeare Company until her death. Chronic ill health necessitated her eventual retirement from acting in 1992. She spent the last decade of her life in quiet retirement at her home in Beaconsfield, where she died of natural causes at the age of 90.

== Filmography ==
=== Film ===
Year	Title	Role	Notes
1937	Lancashire Luck	Betty Lovejoy	
1938	Pygmalion	Eliza Doolittle	Nominated – Academy Award for Best Actress
1941	Major Barbara	Major Barbara Undershaft	
1945	I Know Where I'm Going!	Joan Webster	
1952	Outcast of the Islands	Mrs. Almayer	
1953	Sailor of the King	Lucinda Bentley	also known as Single-Handed
1957	Something of Value	Elizabeth McKenzie Newton	
1957	How to Murder a Rich Uncle	Edith Clitterburn	
1958	Separate Tables	Pat Cooper	Academy Award for Best Supporting Actress; Nominated – Golden Globe Award for Best Supporting Actress – Motion Picture; Nominated – Laurel Award for Top Female Supporting Performance
1960	Sons and Lovers	Gertrude Morel	Nominated – BAFTA Award for Best Actress in a Leading Role
1963	Toys in the Attic	Anna Berniers	Nominated – Golden Globe Award for Best Supporting Actress – Motion Picture
1966	A Man for All Seasons	Alice More	Nominated – Academy Award for Best Supporting Actress; Nominated – Laurel Award for Top Female Supporting Performance
1974	Murder on the Orient Express	Princess Dragomiroff	Evening Standard British Film Award for Best Actress
1976	Voyage of the Damned	Rebecca Weiler	
1979	The Cat and the Canary	Allison Crosby	
1980	The Elephant Man	Mrs. Mothershead	
1981	Miss Morison's Ghosts	Elizabeth Morison	
1982	Making Love	Winnie Bates	
1983	Attracta	Attracta	
1987	The Lonely Passion of Judith Hearne	Aunt D'Arcy	

=== Television ===
Year	Title	Role	Notes
1954	BBC Sunday Night Theatre	Janet De Mullin	Episode: "The Last of the De Mullins"
1958	Armchair Theatre	Margaret Rose	Episode: "The Travelling Lady"
1959	Alfred Hitchcock Presents	Laura Siddons	Episode: "Graduating Class"
1964	Z-Cars	Mrs. Hulme	Episode: "In a Day's Work"
1965	Jackanory	Storyteller	5 episodes
1966–1968	BBC Play of the Month	Lilly Moffat/Harriet	2 episodes
1969	David Copperfield	Emma Micawber	TV film
1969	The Growing Summer	Aunt Dymphna	Silver medal at 1969 Venice Film Festival
1972	Clochemerle	Justine Putet	8 episodes
1978	ITV Playhouse	Mrs. Abercromie	Episode: "Last Wishes"
1978	BBC Television Shakespeare	Duchess of York	Episode: "Richard II"
1979	Tales of the Unexpected	Louisa	Episode: "Edward the Conqueror"
1980	The Curse of King Tut's Tomb	Princess Vilma	TV film
1981	Play for Today	Lady Daisy Carlion	Episode: "Country"
1982	The Kingfisher	Evelyn	TV film
1982	Witness for the Prosecution	Janet Mackenzie	TV film
1985	The Importance of Being Earnest	Lady Bracknell	TV film
1985	The Death of the Heart	Matchett	TV film
1986	Lord Mountbatten: The Last Viceroy	Princess Victoria	Miniseries
1986	Only Yesterday	May Darley	TV film
1986	All Passion Spent	Lady Slane	Miniseries
1987	Anne of Avonlea	Margaret Harris	Miniseries
1988	A Taste for Death	Lady Ursula Berowne	Miniseries
1989	Ending Up	Adela	TV film
1991	The Best of Friends	Laurentia McLachlan	TV film
1992	ScreenPlay	Countess Alice von Holzendorf	Episode: "The Countess Alice"

== Awards and nominations ==
=== Academy Awards ===
Year	Category	Nominated work	Result	Ref.
1939	Best Actress	Pygmalion	Nominated	
1959	Best Supporting Actress	Separate Tables	Won	
1967	Best Supporting Actress	A Man for All Seasons	Nominated	

=== Golden Globe Awards ===
Year	Category	Nominated work	Result	Ref.
1959	Best Supporting Actress – Motion Picture	Separate Tables	Nominated	
1964	Best Supporting Actress – Motion Picture	Toys in the Attic	Nominated	

=== BAFTA Awards ===
Year	Category	Nominated work	Result	Ref.
British Academy Film Awards
1961	Best British Actress	Sons and Lovers	Nominated	
British Academy Television Awards
1987	Best Actress	All Passion Spent	Nominated	

=== Tony Awards ===
Year	Category	Nominated work	Result	Ref.
1958	Best Actress in a Play	A Moon for the Misbegotten	Nominated	

=== Laurence Olivier Awards ===
Year	Category	Nominated work	Result	Ref.
1978	Actress of the Year in a Revival	Waters of the Moon	Nominated	
