= Domenico Vittorini =

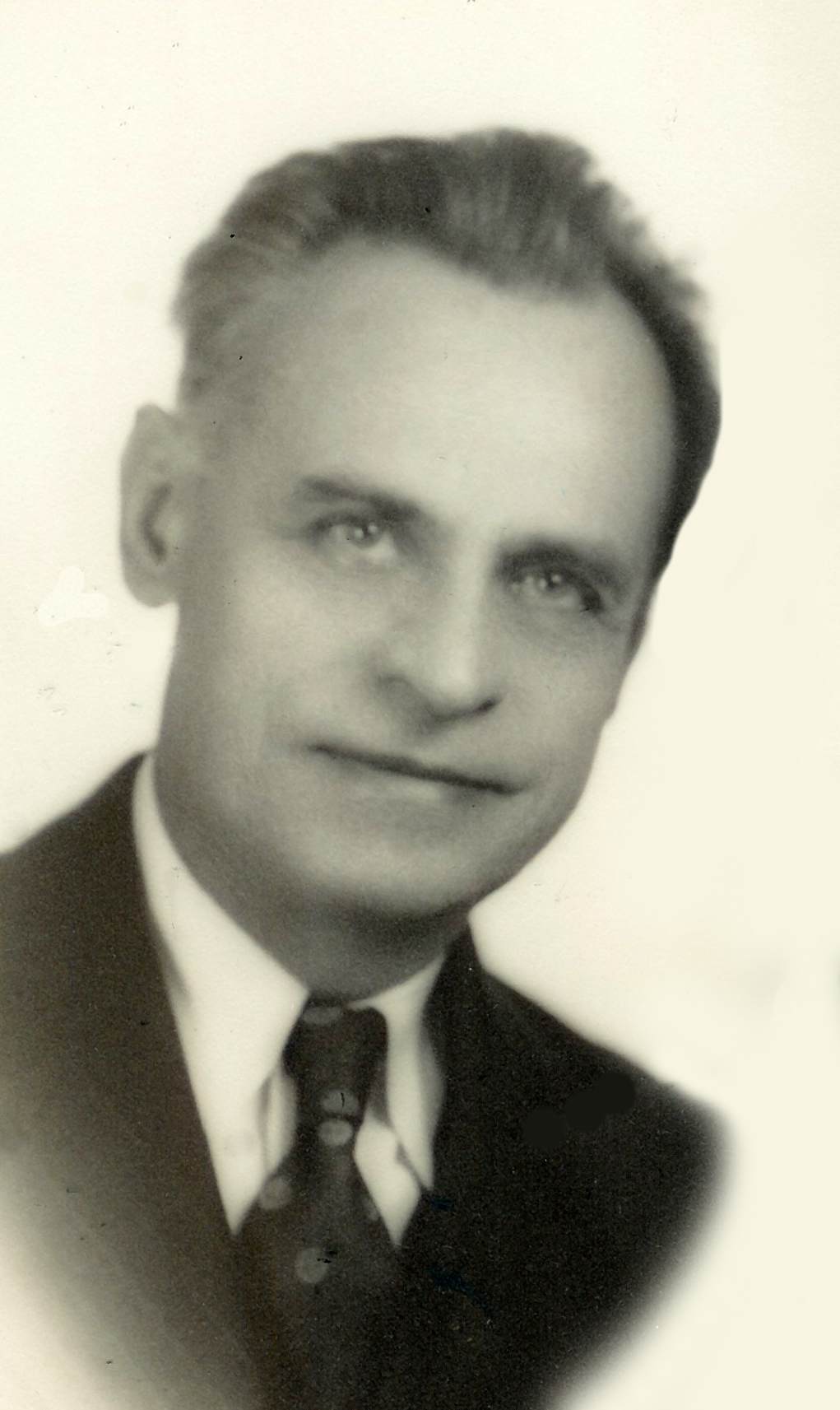
Image of Professor Domenico Vittorini

Domenico Vittorini (1892–1958) was an Italian-born writer and American academic.

== Biography ==
Domenico Vittorini was born in Preturo, L'Aquila, Abruzzo, Italy on October 28, 1892 and died 66 years later in Havertown, Pennsylvania, on March 9, 1958. His wife, Helen Whitney, was a student in his first class and they were married the day following her graduation. He had two children, Helen, born in 1923, and Carlo, born in 1929.

He immigrated to the United States in 1917 and received a graduate degree in English at Princeton University. He taught briefly at Temple University before joining the faculty at University of Pennsylvania where he taught Romance Languages and World Literature from 1919 to 1958.

"At the University of Pennsylvania, he used both the grammar and oral methods of teaching in his elementary courses with such excellent results that, in the words of one of his colleagues, 'his students reached a level of oral proficiency and comprehension that I have seldom seen equaled.' As to the advanced courses, those for which he had a special predilection were Dante and the modern field, particularly Pirandello."

In the last year of his life Vittorini created— along with many articles and reviews — books like the revised edition of his books: Drama of Pirandello, Attraverso i Secoli and The Age of Dante.

During this time he also wrote High Points in the History of Italian Literature, a collection of 23 essays from Dante to current time. Unfinished works include Age of Boccaccio and Petrarch, which is a sequel to his book on Dante.

One of Vittorini's most enduring works is a translation of Italian children's folk tales called Old Italian Tales for Children. A selection of these tales was re-published through the efforts of his son, Carlo Vittorini, by Crown Publishers in 1995 under the name, The Thread of Life. This full-color volume was illustrated by children's book artist Mary GrandPre.

Upon his death, former students and other followers established the Vittorini Scholarship Fund at the America-Italy Society of Philadelphia which awards scholarships each year to outstanding undergraduate students of Italian literature and culture at the University of Pennsylvania.
