= Lancashire Luck =

- Lobby card, with George Carney and Wendy Hiller
- Directed by: Henry Cass
- Written by: Ronald Gow (story); A.R. Rawlinson (writer)
- Produced by: Anthony Havelock-Allan
- Starring: Wendy Hiller, Nigel Stock
- Cinematography: Francis Carver
- Production company: Ambassador Film Productions
- Distributed by: British & Dominions Film Corporation
- Release date: 12 November 1937
- Running time: 74 minutes
- Country: United Kingdom
- Language: English

Lancashire Luck is a 1937 British comedy film directed by Henry Cass. It was written by A.R. Rawlinson and Ronald Gow, and was produced as quota quickie. It is notable as the film debut of Wendy Hiller, and the first credited appearance of Nigel Stock.

== Plot ==
Mrs Lovejoy, the wife of Lancashire carpenter George, wins £500 on the football pools and decides to open a country tea-room. George and their two children, Betty and Joe, reluctantly go along with the plan. While the business is initially a roaring success, it soon draws the ire of Lady Maydew, the snobbish mother of the weak-willed local landowner, Sir Gerald. Appalled by the invasion of commercialism, she schemes to ruin the family's enterprise. Sir Gerald and Betty fall in love, and their romance inspires the young landowner to finally assert his independence and take proper control of both his life and his estates. Ultimately, the Lovejoys get the fair treatment they deserve, and Lady Maydew steps aside in favour of Betty.

== Cast ==
- George Carney as George Lovejoy
- Margaret Damer as Lady Maydew
- George Galleon as Sir George Maydew
- Muriel George as Mrs. Lovejoy
- Wendy Hiller as Betty Lovejoy
- Bett Huth as Lady Evelyn Brenton
- Peter Popp
- Nigel Stock as Joe Lovejoy

== Reception ==
Kine Weekly wrote: "The entertainment never aspires above the novelettish; but its ingenousness is both disarming and refreshing. The stars are in good form, and the production work is definitely above the average. ... There are moments when the director displays a tendency to swamp the simple plot with sugary padding, but in most cases the players reveal sufficient resource to keep what little drama there is.in clear persspective."

The Daily Film Renter wrote: "The romantic angles are nicely looked after, and there is plenty of good, homely comedy born of Mr. Lovejoy's reactions to the country following a life in town. Settings, which include grim mill-town, the cottage, and an ornate mansion, are first-rate, while direction is on straightforward lines."

Picture Show wrote: "This film is rather slow in development, but provides fairly good entertainment. ... George Carney and Muriel George are excellent in their roles, and supporting roles are well filled."
