= The Secret Kingdom (novel) =

1938 novel

- First edition
- Author: Walter Greenwood
- Language: English
- Genre: Drama
- Publisher: Jonathan Cape
- Publication date: 1938
- Publication place: United Kingdom
- Media type: Print

The Secret Kingdom is a 1938 novel by the British writer Walter Greenwood. Like his best-known novel Love on the Dole it is set in Salford. It portrays the working-class socialist Byron family, and particularly the eldest daughter Paula who tries to establish an independent identity after finding working a parlour maid. She encounters Bert Treville in nearby Manchester and the two begin a courtship. After his death due to heavy drinking, she brings up her son Lance as a single-mother, throwing her effort into her talented child she is vindicated when he emerges as a talented concert pianist - performing on national radio in the final scene.

== Adaptation ==
In 1960 it was adapted into an eight-part BBC television series of the same title. Greenwood had in the 1940s had written a screenplay based on the story, but it remained unproduced.

== Bibliography ==
- Baskin, Ellen. Serials on British Television, 1950-1994. Scolar Press, 1996.
- Hopkins, Chris. Walter Greenwood's Love on the Dole: Novel, Play, Film. Oxford University Press, 2018.
