= All Passion Spent =

1931 novel by Vita Sackville-West

- Cover of the 1st (British) edition
- Author: Vita Sackville-West
- Cover artist: Vanessa Bell
- Language: English language
- Genre: Literary fiction
- Publisher: Leonard and Virginia Woolf at The Hogarth Press (UK); Doubleday, Doran & Company (US)
- Publication date: 1931
- Publication place: London, England (UK); Garden City, New York (US)
- Media type: Print (hardcover)
- Pages: 296 (UK); 294 (US)
- OCLC: 190720

All Passion Spent is a literary fiction novel by Vita Sackville-West. Published in 1931, it is one of Sackville-West's most popular works and has been adapted for television by the BBC. The novel addresses people's, especially women's, control of their lives, a subject about which Sackville-West was greatly concerned although often pointing out that she did not consider herself a feminist. The title is taken from the final three words of John Milton's Samson Agonistes.

== Plot introduction ==
All Passion Spent is written in three parts, primarily from the view of an intimate observer. The first part introduces Lady Slane at the time of her husband's death. She has been the dutiful wife of a "great man" in public life, Viceroy of India and a member of the House of Lords. Her children plan to share her care between them much as they divide up the family property but unexpectedly Lady Slane makes her own decision, proposing to leave fashionable Kensington for a cottage in suburban Hampstead that caught her eye decades earlier, where she will live alone except for her maidservant and please herself — for example allowing her descendants to visit only by appointment. Part 1 concludes with Lady Slane's developing friendships with her aged landlord Mr Bucktrout and his equally aged handyman Mr Gosheron.

Part 2, shorter than the others, is composed of Lady Slane's thoughts as she muses in the summer sun. She relives youthful events, reviews her life and considers life's influences and controls, happiness and relationships.

Summer is over. Part 3 takes place after Lady Slane has settled into her cottage, her contemplative life and approaching end. To her initial annoyance, her past life still connects her to people and events. Mr FitzGeorge, a forgotten acquaintance from India who has ever since been in love with her, introduces himself and they form a quiet but playful and understanding friendship.

Mr FitzGeorge bequeaths his fortune and outstanding art collection to Lady Slane, causing great consternation amongst her children. Lady Slane, avoiding the responsibility of vast wealth, gives FitzGeorge's collection and fortune to the state, much to her children's disgust and her maid's amusement. Lady Slane discovers that relinquishing the fortune has permitted Deborah, her great-granddaughter, to break off her engagement and pursue music, Deborah taking the path that Lady Slane could not.

== Characters ==
Lady Slane (Lady Holland, Deborah Lee). The central character, an 88-year-old woman who, towards the end of her life, is emancipated by her husband's death. Sharing much with Sackville-West, Lady Slane explicitly states that she is not a feminist and considers such issues to be questions of human rights, while acknowledging the more difficult position of women.

Mr FitzGeorge. An acquaintance from Lady Slane's distant past as Vicereine of India, millionaire by inheritance, lover of beauty and fine art. An eccentric who lives as a pauper.

Genoux. Lady Slane's 86-year-old French maid and companion, who has served Lady Slane her entire adult life.

Mr Bucktrout. The elderly and eccentric owner and agent of Lady Slane's cottage, who forms an understanding and regular friendship with Lady Slane.

Mr Gosheron. A builder, of advanced years, introduced by Mr Bucktrout to renovate Lady Slane's cottage.

Kay. A "chubby old gentleman" who is Lady Slane's youngest son. Kay lives alone with his collection of astrolabes and instruments; his only friend is Mr FitzGeorge.

Edith. Lady Slane's youngest daughter (60), undisciplined and easily flustered, to her siblings' amusement and distaste.

Herbert. Lady Slane's eldest boy (68), married to Mabel; member of parliament.

Carrie. Lady Slane's daughter, married to Roland.

Charles. Lady Slane's son, a retired general.

William. Lady Slane's parsimonious son (64), married to the equally miserly Lavinia.

Deborah. Lady Slane's great granddaughter.

Richard. Herbert's eldest son.

== Major themes ==
All Passion Spent echoes some of Sackville-West's primary concerns: people's place in society, society's constrictions on people, and women's control of their lives. Sackville-West, voiced by Lady Slane, disavowed feminism and like her long-time lover and friend Virginia Woolf, considered the issues raised were issues of human rights rather than women's rights.

== Adaptations ==
In 1986 All Passion Spent was adapted into a 3 episode BBC television series starring Wendy Hiller as Lady Slane. In 2009 BBC Radio 4's Woman's Hour broadcast a five-part adaptation starring Honor Blackman as Lady Slane and Mr FitzGeorge played by Alec McCowen.
