= Barb Rosenstock =

Children's author

- Born: April 1, 1960 (age 66)
- Education: Loyola University
- Occupation: Children's non-fiction author
- Writing career
- Genre: Children's non-fiction
- Notable awards: Golden Kite Award; Caldecott Honor; Orbis Pictus Honor
- Website: barbrosenstock.com

Barb Rosenstock (born 1 April 1960) is an American author and illustrator of children's literature books. In 2015, her book The Noisy Paint Box, illustrated by Mary Grandpré, received a Caldecott Honor, The Secret Kingdom and Otis and Will discover the deep won Orbis Pictus Honor, and Through the Window won Sydney Taylor Honor and the California Library Association Beatty Award as well as numerous national and state recognitions.

== Early life ==
Rosenstock was born on 1 April 1960 in Chicago, Illinois. She graduated from Loyola University in Chicago with a bachelor's in psychology. In 2001, Rosenstock received a MAT in Elementary Education from National Louis University after student teaching second grade. In 2018, she was a visiting author at the Library of Congress.

== Literary career ==
As a teacher and mother, she enjoyed reading to her students and her two sons, which made her passionate about picture books. She states that “my two sons were my original inspiration”. This led her to join SCBWI, a society of children’s authors, and start writing her books. Her works have gained praise for illuminating the lives and events of historical figures, artists, and more in a form fit for children as said by School Library Journal in a review for Thomas Jefferson Builds A Library, “It is no small feat to entertain children in a book about loving books, but this duo [Barb Rosenstock and her illustrator, John O’Brien] succeeds admirably”

== Selected works ==
- Fearless: The Story of Racing Legend Louise Smith, Dutton Children's Books (Penguin Random House) 2010
- The Littlest Mountain, Alfred A. Knopf (Penguin Random House) 2011
- The Camping Trip That Changed America: Theodore Roosevelt, John Muir and Our National Parks, Dial Books for Young Readers (Penguin Random House) 2012
- Thomas Jefferson Builds a Library, Boyds Mills & Kane 2013
- The Noisy Paint Box: The Colors and Sounds of Kandinsky's Abstract Art, Alfred A. Knopf (Penguin Random House) 2014
- The Streak: How Joe Dimaggio Became America's Hero, Boyds Mills & Kane 2014
- Ben Franklin's Big Splash: The Mostly True Story of His First Invention, Calkins Creek (Highlights) 2015
- Dorothea's Eyes: Dorothea Lange Photographs the Truth, Calkins Creek (Highlights) 2016
- Vincent Can't Sleep: Van Gogh Paints the Night Sky, Alfred A. Knopf (Penguin Random House) 2017
- The Secret Kingdom: NEK Chand, a Changing India, and a Hidden World of Art, Candlewick Press 2018
- Blue Grass Boy: The Story of Bill Monroe, Father of Bluegrass Music, Calkins Creek (Highlights) 2018
- Otis and Will Discover the Deep: The Record-Setting Dive of the Bathysphere, Little Brown Books for Young Readers (Hachette Book Group USA) 2018
- Through the Window: Views of Marc Chagall's Life and Art, Alfred A. Knopf (Penguin Random House) 2018
- Yogi: The Life, Loves, and Language of Baseball Legend Yogi Berra, Calkins Creek (Highlights) 2019
- Prairie Boy: Frank Lloyd Wright Turns the Heartland Into a Home, Calkins Creek (Highlights) 2019
- Fight of the Century: Alice Paul Battles Woodrow Wilson for the Vote, Calkins Creek (Highlights) 2020
- Leave It to Abigail!: The Revolutionary Life of Abigail Adams, Little, Brown Books for Young Readers (Hachette Book Group USA) 2020
- Mornings with Monet, Knopf Books for Young Readers 2021
- The Mystery of the Monarchs: How Kids, Teachers, and Butterfly Fans Helped Fred and Norah Urquhart Track the Great Monarch Migration, Knopf Books for Young Readers 2022

== Awards and honors ==
- The John and Patricia Beatty Award (2013) for The Camping Trip That Changed America: Theodore Roosevelt, John Muir and Our National Parks
- Bank Street Best Book of the Year (2013) for The Camping Trip That Changed America: Theodore Roosevelt, John Muir and Our National Parks
- The Caldecott Honor (2015) for The Noisy Paint Box: The Colors and Sounds of Kandinsky's Abstract Art
- ILA Teacher's Choice (2015) for The Noisy Paint Box: The Colors and Sounds of Kandinsky's Abstract Art
- ALA Notable (2015) for The Noisy Paint Box: The Colors and Sounds of Kandinsky's Abstract Art
- Bank Street Best Book of the Year (2015) for The Noisy Paint Box: The Colors and Sounds of Kandinsky's Abstract Art
- Bank Street Best Book of the Year (2015) for The Streak: How Joe DiMaggio Became America's Hero
- The Orbis Pictus Recommended (2015) for The Streak: How Joe DiMaggio Became America's Hero
- ISHOF Dawson Award (2015) for Ben Franklin's Big Splash: The Mostly True Story of His First Invention
- NSTA Best STEM Book (2017) for Ben Franklin's Big Splash: The Mostly True Story of His First Invention
- The Golden Kite (2019) for Otis and Will Discover the Deep: The Record-Setting Dive of the Bathysphere
- Orbis Pictus Recommended (2019) for Otis and Will Discover the Deep: The Record-Setting Dive of the Bathysphere
- NSTA Outstanding Science Trade Book (2019) for Otis and Will Discover the Deep: The Record-Setting Dive of the Bathysphere
- NSTA Best STEM Book (2019) for Otis and Will Discover the Deep: The Record-Setting Dive of the Bathysphere
- Bank Street Best Book of the Year (2019) for Otis and Will Discover the Deep: The Record-Setting Dive of the Bathysphere
- Bank Street Best Book of the Year (2019) for The Secret Kingdom: NEK Chand, a Changing India, and a Hidden World of Art
- The Orbis Pictus Honor (2019) for The Secret Kingdom: NEK Chand, a Changing India, and a Hidden World of Art
- The South Asia Book Award (2019) for The Secret Kingdom: NEK Chand, a Changing India, and a Hidden World of Art
- Bank Street Best Book of the Year (2019) for Through the Window: Views of Marc Chagall's Life and Art
- Sydney Taylor Book Honor (2019) for Through the Window: Views of Marc Chagall's Life

== Personal life ==
Rosenstock lives with her family in Chicago, Illinois.
