= The Secret Kingdom (TV series) =

British television series

- Genre: Drama
- Based on: The Secret Kingdom by Walter Greenwood
- Written by: Sheila Hodgson
- Directed by: Chloe Gibson
- Starring: Maureen Pryor; Anthony Newlands; Sheila Manahan
- Country of origin: United Kingdom
- Original language: English
- No. of series: 1
- No. of episodes: 8 (all missing)

Production
- Producer: Chloe Gibson
- Running time: 30 minutes

Original release
- Network: BBC 1
- Release: 6 May – 24 June 1960

The Secret Kingdom is a British television series that originally aired on BBC in eight episodes between 6 May and 24 June 1960. It is an adaptation of the 1938 novel of the same title by Walter Greenwood. The plot revolves around Paula Byron, from a working class family in Salford. It was directed and produced by Chloe Gibson.

All eight episodes are believed to be lost.

== Main cast ==
- Maureen Pryor as Paula Byron
- Anthony Newlands as Henry Waring
- Anne Godfrey as Viola Byron
- Sheila Manahan as Anne Byron
- John Stratton as Bert Treville
- Kevin Stoney as Boyo Doyle
- Malcolm Keen as William Byron
- Ray Brooks as Figgins
- David Phethean as Dick Marlowe
- Douglas Ives as Alf Briggs
- Richard Davies as Rigby
- Marjorie Rhodes as Mrs Lorimer

== Bibliography ==
- Baskin, Ellen . Serials on British Television, 1950-1994. Scolar Press, 1996.
