= Lanthier =

Lanthier may refer to:

- Claude Lanthier (1933–2015), Canadian politician
- Jean-Marc Lanthier (ice hockey) (born 1963), professional ice hockey player from Quebec
- Jean-Marc Lanthier (Canadian Army officer), Canadian Army officer
- Jennifer Lanthier (born 1964), Canadian children's author and journalist
- Richard Lanthier, member of the Canadian rock band April Wine

== See also ==
- Lantier (disambiguation)
