= The Good Companions (disambiguation) =

The Good Companions may refer to:

- The Good Companions, a 1929 novel by J.B. Priestley
- The Good Companions (play), a 1931 theatrical adaptation of the novel by Priestley and Edward Knoblock
- The Good Companions (1933 film), a 1933 film based on the novel directed by Victor Saville
- The Good Companions (1957 film), a 1957 remake of the 1933 film directed by J. Lee Thompson
- The Good Companions (musical), a 1974 stage musical based on the novel
