= The Secret Kingdom (children's book) =

2018 book by Barb Rosenstock

- Author: Barb Rosenstock
- Illustrator: Claire A. Nivola
- Language: English
- Genre: Nonfiction, Children's Picture Book
- Publisher: Candlewick Press
- Publication date: February 13, 2018
- Publication place: United States of America
- ISBN: 978-0763674755

The Secret Kingdom: Nek Chand, a Changing India, and a Hidden World of Art is a nonfiction children's picture book by American author Barb Rosenstock and illustrated by Claire A. Nivola. It was published on February 13, 2018, by Candlewick Press. The book tells the story of Nek Chand, an artist who preserved his culture by creating the Chandigarh Rock Garden after fleeing violence following the India-Pakistan partition of 1947. Chand recreated his village with the ruins of the villages he found beneath the modern city, which became a cultural haven to residents and visitors alike.

School Library Journal reviews The Secret Kingdom as a "captivating biographical narrative", bringing life to the "kingdom of magic and imagination". Publishers Weekly describes it as a "gratifying" story, conveying art's power to "revitalize and restore."

The Secret Kingdom received the NCTE Orbis Pictus Honor and the South Asian Book Award in 2019.

== Plot ==
Long ago, Nek Chand Saini lived in the village of Berian Kalan, a small community near the Himalayas – depicted in the book through colorful illustrations of his family life and broader community. He loves the different stories his friends and family tell him with each changing season, and cherishes the cultural richness and beauty in his community's simple lifestyle. Inspired by the stories passed along to him, Chand creates a majestic world from his imagination – full of sand palaces, kings and goddesses made of clay and sticks, and inhabits it with jackals, monkeys, and geese made of rocks. After he grows up, he becomes a farmer and continues the cycle of traditions and stories with each season passing for generations after him.

However, his community violently splits into Pakistan and India in 1947, and his Hindu family is forced to flee the primarily Muslim Pakistan and move to India because of the hostile situation between the Hindus and Muslims that the partition created.

In India, he moves to Chandigarh, a modern city which lacks his home's cultural richness and connections – seen in the book's beige illustrations of the city in comparison to the vibrant illustrations of his home village. He finds acres of jungle owned by the government, and for the next seven years collects discarded bits and pieces of the destroyed ancient villages, such as old bicycle wheels, discarded gourds for water, porcelain shards, and native plants that he rescues.

After this, he begins to create the Chandigarh Rock Garden, a memorial which replicates his home village in its beauty and cultural splendor. Like the imaginative world he created as a child, he fills it with inhabitants: goddesses and queens made of old bicycles and pipes, laughing and jubilant people made of bracelets, and jackals, monkeys, and geese – honoring the community and culture that was so important to him as a child.

Fifteen years later, the government discovers his building, and officials want to destroy it. However, the people of Chandigarh, curious to see Nek Chand's creations, come to the forest and begin to tell stories about it after revisiting parts of their past in the city. They donate money, tools, and materials to sustain the project, helping people connect with their culture despite the opposition that the garden faces every year.

== Themes ==
=== Resilience ===
Resilience is a major theme seen throughout The Secret Kingdom and is brought forth by the protagonist, Nek Chand. According to Seemi Aziz-Raina, Chand's story is one of "bloodshed, displacement, and refugees," as Chand is forced to flee India for Pakistan following the 1947 partition and loses "everything he loves and cherishes", according to a review by the National Council of Teachers of English. He works through this trauma by turning to art, which allows him to use the stories from his past to create a monument paying tribute to it.

He again persists through the government's efforts to destroy the rock garden when they discover it, continuing to expand and create the garden for the community to enjoy, according to Jaime Greenwood's review. In doing this, he not only "picks up the scraps of his village life", but "created a new home with his art" that supported not only him but his community. Through the continuous presentation of Chand's difficulties and ability to overcome them throughout the book, Barb Rosenstock contends the virtues of resilience, and emphasizes the significance in community and the power of story in making that possible. She also maintains that resilience can be a point at which a community can grow out of, connected by shared experiences, challenges, and triumphs.

=== Power of storytelling ===
The 2019 Orbis Pictus Book Award Reviews describe how the power of storytelling is seen early in the book, as the "stories that shaped [Nek Chand's] world, imagination, and life" influence his artistic pursuits as a child, as he represents his village and community through sculpture. Storytelling also contributes to his resilience through hardship later in life, as he settled in the village of Chandigarh with "nothing but stories brought from his village" after the violent India-Pakistan partition of 1947. Even though he had nothing else, those stories sustained him and helped him remember the community that he loved, which he began to "rebuild a tribute" to through the rock garden that he built, as Rosenstock describes on her website.

Storytelling is also a means of continuity through generations for his community, as he describes their impact on him as a child and his desire to share them with children as an adult. After leaving Pakistan, he is still able to pass on those stories through the "intimate" architecture of his rock garden, creating a "new home" for himself and his community. By developing the power of story in Chand's life within this book, Rosenstock teaches children about the significant impact that learning from and cherishing the experiences of others can have on their lives.
