= Ronald Gow =

English dramatist (1897–1993)

- Born: 1 November 1897; Heaton Moor, Stockport, England
- Died: 27 April 1993 (aged 95); Beaconsfield, England
- Occupation: Dramatist

Ronald Gow (1 November 1897 – 27 April 1993) was an English dramatist, best known for Love on the Dole (1934).

Born in Heaton Moor, Stockport, Cheshire, the son of a bank manager, Gow attended Altrincham County High School. After training as a chemist, he returned to his old school as a teacher. In the late 1920s he made several educational silent films with his pupils: The People of the Axe (1926) and The People of the Lake (1928) recreated life in ancient Britain, the latter produced 'with the approval of' Sir William Boyd Dawkins; The Man Who Changed His Mind (1928) was a Boy Scout adventure with a cameo from Robert Baden-Powell; The Glittering Sword (1929) was a medieval parable about disarmament.

Writing occupied his spare time during his years as a schoolmaster, and he wrote several plays for the BBC. At the age of 35 he had his first professional production, in London and New York, with Gallows Glorious (1933), a play about the American slavery abolitionist John Brown.

In 1934 he wrote Love on the Dole, based on Walter Greenwood's novel about unemployment in Salford during the Great Depression. The play was a huge success. Wendy Hiller played the lead, and also made her first film appearance in the Gow-scripted Lancashire Luck.

In 1937 Hiller and Gow married. They later moved to Beaconsfield, Buckinghamshire, where they raised two children, Ann (1939–2006) and Anthony (b. 1942). He lived with Hiller at their home, "Spindles", until his death in 1993. He continued writing plays into his eighties, providing material for his wife in adaptations of Tess of the D'Urbervilles (1946), which was a great success while Ann Veronica (1949), adapted from the H. G. Wells novel, quickly proved a commercial failure. Gow was co-credited for the book used in the musical version of Ann Veronica which premiered in 1969. His other adaptations include Vita Sackville-West's The Edwardians and A Boston Story (1966), based on Henry James' Watch and Ward.

== Selected works ==
- Love on the Dole (1934)
- Jenny Jones (1944)
