= Sharon Cather =

American art historian (1947–2019)

Sharon Cather (5 August 1947 – 6 June 2019), Shelby White and Leon Levy Professor of Conservation Studies, was an art historian who taught at Cambridge University and was a professor at the Courtauld Institute of Art, where she specialised in the preservation of wall paintings.

== Early life and education ==
Cather was born at Berkeley, California, and graduated in art history from the University of California, Santa Barbara. She spent ten years working in the art department offices there, before undertaking MA study at Princeton University and going on to undertake PhD work under Professor John Shearman on Sebastiano Serlio.

== Career ==
From 1981 to 1982, Cather was at the American Academy in Rome, assisting Professor Irving Lavin with an exhibition on Gian Lorenzo Bernini's drawings. From 1982, she lectured in the art history department of the University of Cambridge; in 1985, she helped to establish the Conservation of Wall Painting department at the Courtauld Institute of Art.

Cather was Vice President of the International Institute for Conservation of Historic and Artistic Works from 2010-2014.

In 2014 Cather was awarded the People's Republic of China Friendship Award (China) after a long period of collaboration with the Dunhuang Academy.

In 2017, Cather received the Plowden Medal from the Royal Warrant Holders Association citing “her commitment and leadership in research, innovation and education in wall painting conservation” towards “a more holistic, methodical and scientific approach to conserving wall painting across the world—whether in an English cathedral or an Indian palace”.

A conference in memory of Cather scheduled for April 2020 was cancelled due to the COVID-19 pandemic.
