= Mary GrandPré =

American illustrator (born 1954)

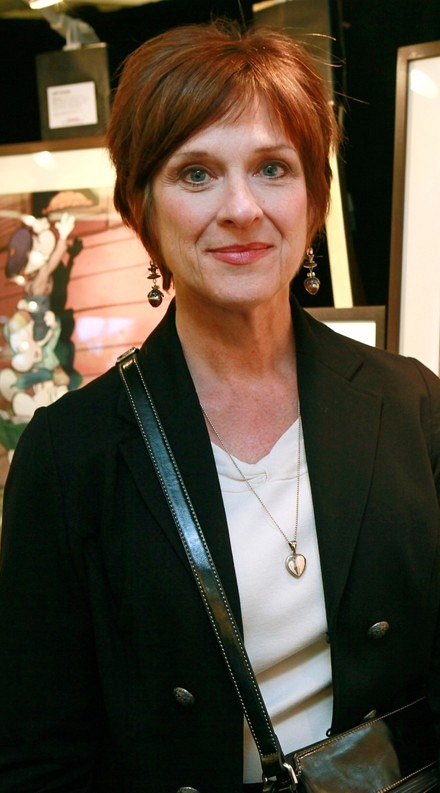
- GrandPré in 2011
- Born: February 13, 1954 (age 72); South Dakota, U.S.
- Education: Pomona College; Minneapolis College of Art and Design, 1981
- Known for: Illustration
- Notable work: Harry Potter (U.S. eds.); Pockets (picture book); The Noisy Paint Box
- Spouse(s): Kevin Whaley (divorced); Tom Casmer
- Children: 1
- Awards: The Society of Illustrators, 2015 Caldecott Honor
- Website: marygrandpre.com

Mary GrandPré (/ˈɡrænpreɪ/ GRAN-pray; born February 13, 1954) is an American illustrator best known for her cover and chapter illustrations of the Harry Potter books in their U.S. editions published by Scholastic. She received a Caldecott Honor in 2015 for illustrating Barb Rosenstock's The Noisy Paint Box: The Colors and Sounds of Kandinsky's Abstract Art. GrandPré, who creates her artwork with paint and pastels, has illustrated more than twenty books and has appeared in gallery exhibitions and periodicals such as The New Yorker, Atlantic Monthly, and The Wall Street Journal.

== Early life ==
Mary GrandPré was born February 13, 1954 in South Dakota. She began drawing when she was five years old, beginning with a reproduction of Walt Disney's cartoon character "Mickey Mouse". By age ten, she was imitating Salvador Dalí, experimenting with stretched objects painted with oils, before graduating to copying black-and-white photos from the encyclopedia. She was influenced by the stained glass windows of the church where she attended Mass daily, saying, "There was a kind of luminous quality about them, a glow, that sometimes comes out in my artwork, whether I mean it to or not."

She was a Fine Arts major at Pomona College and was in her mid-twenties before she considered art school, having assumed illustration was "a boring, commercial thing". She graduated from the Minneapolis College of Art and Design in 1981.

== Career ==
GrandPré married designer Kevin Whaley when she was young. After they divorced, she attended the Minneapolis College of Art and Design. After her graduation, GrandPré spent several years as a waitress while working to be noticed by ad agencies and attempting to find her own style. Her drawing evolved into what she calls "soft geometry", featuring pastels. Her work is created completely by hand, without using a computer.

Mary GrandPré has created images for advertising and magazines, including The New Yorker, The Atlantic, and the Wall Street Journal. Among her other famous works, she was commissioned to illustrate the official poster for the 2005 Minnesota State Fair. A DreamWorks executive who enjoyed her work called to invite her to participate as an illustrator for their movie Antz, for which GrandPré was involved with creating some of the landscapes. She has also participated in character development for the animated film Ice Age (2002), by Blue Sky Studios. She has taught at The Ringling School of Art and Design.

=== Harry Potter series ===
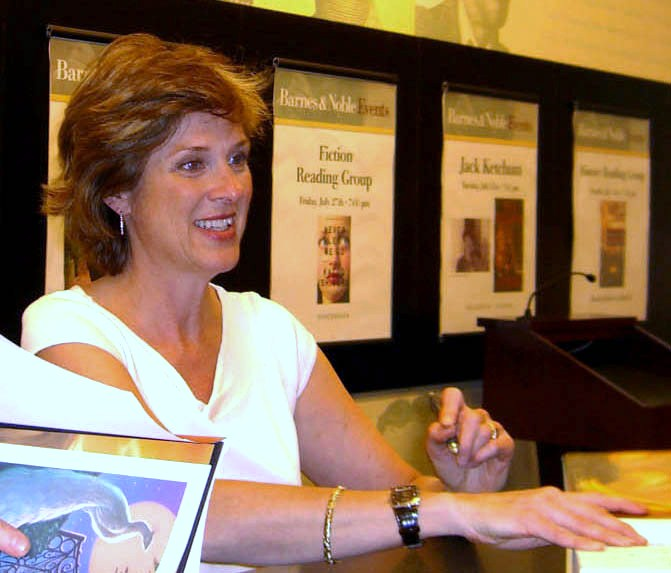
GrandPré signing Harry Potter and the Deathly Hallows at a Barnes & Noble in Lincoln Square in Manhattan on July 21, 2007, the day of the book's release

GrandPré's work on the Harry Potter novel series came when David Saylor of Scholastic contacted her. Though GrandPré initially declined the assignment due to her schedule, he eventually convinced her to take it. GrandPré says, "By the time I was working on Book 3, we knew we were dealing with something very special." GrandPré illustrated all of the American editions of the Harry Potter novels. She was one of the few people who were able to read the Harry Potter books before they were released to the general public. When she received each new book, she read the story through once, highlighting descriptions that she felt would do well as an illustration. She then created various sketches as ideas for the cover and chapter art before sending her favorites to the editors to decide which should appear in the final publication. GrandPré devised her images after reading the manuscripts for the books and did not collaborate with or receive input from J.K. Rowling, although the two did meet. Her artwork for the final novel in the series, Harry Potter and the Deathly Hallows, was created using pastels on toned printmaking paper, while the chapter headings were black-and-white charcoal drawings.

=== Other work ===
In addition to the Harry Potter series, she has illustrated picture books including Pockets, The Noisy Paint Box, Chin Yu Min and the Ginger Cat, Vegetables Go to Bed, The Thread of Life, Swing Around the Sun, The Sea Chest, and Sweep Dreams. She also illustrated Plum, and Henry and Pawl and the Round Yellow Ball, which was co-written by her husband, Tom Casmer.

During the COVID-19 pandemic, GrandPré branched out from paintings, and began making sock monkeys as a way to cope with stress. Some of these monkeys have been sold, with partial proceeds going towards Covid relief charities.

=== Recognition ===
GrandPré's illustrations for The Noisy Paint Box authored by Barb Rosenstock were recognized by the 2015 Caldecott Medal committee. She was given a Caldecott Honor for her work in this picture book biography of Wassily Kandinsky, evoking his synesthesia. GrandPré's work with the Harry Potter books has been featured on the cover of Time magazine. Her work, chosen from thousands of illustrators, has also been featured on the cover of Showcase 16. She has received awards from The Society of Illustrators, Communication Arts, Graphis, Print, and Art Direction, and has been profiled in Step-by-Step Graphics and Communications Arts Magazine. GrandPré has also been featured in the book How Jane Won, which examines fifty women who have been successful in their chosen career and in their personal lives.

== Charity work ==
In 2006, GrandPré began creating art for herself instead of for an assignment. She has donated several pieces to The Wellness Community of Southwest Florida, a non-profit organization providing support for people with cancer. She has also contributed to her local Habitat for Humanity charity by donating artwork and books.

== Personal life ==
According to a November 2003 article in Sarasota magazine, Grandpré had recently moved to Sarasota, Florida with her husband, Tom Casmer, who had recently taken a position as head of the illustration department at the Ringling School of Art and Design.

In a June 2007 St. Paul Pioneer Press article, GrandPré revealed that six months prior, she and her husband went to China, where they adopted a little girl.

== Selected works ==
=== Poetry collections ===
- Swing Around the Sun, poems by Barbara Juster Esbensen (the Fall season; Lerner Publishing Group, 2002)
- Plum, poetry by Tony Mitton (Scholastic, 2003)

=== Harry Potter series ===
- Harry Potter and the Philosopher's Stone, by J.K. Rowling (Scholastic, 1998); Anniversary Edition (Scholastic, 2008)
- Harry Potter and the Chamber of Secrets, by J.K. Rowling (Scholastic, 1999)
- Harry Potter and the Prisoner of Azkaban, by J.K. Rowling (Scholastic, 1999)
- Harry Potter and the Goblet of Fire, by J.K. Rowling (Scholastic, 2000)
- Harry Potter and the Order of the Phoenix, by J.K. Rowling, (Scholastic, 2003)
- Harry Potter and the Half-Blood Prince, by J.K. Rowling (Scholastic, 2005)
- Harry Potter and the Deathly Hallows, by J.K. Rowling (Scholastic, 2007)
- The cover of The Tales of Beedle the Bard, by J.K. Rowling (Scholastic, 2008)
- The box of the special edition of Quidditch Through the Ages and Fantastic Beasts and Where to Find Them (Scholastic, 2005)

=== Storybooks ===
- Chin Yu Min and the Ginger Cat, by Jennifer Armstrong (Crown Publishers, 1993), LCCN 92-8658
- The Vegetables Go to Bed, by Christopher L. King (Crown, 1994)
- The Thread of Life: Twelve Old Italian Tales, retold by Domenico Vittorini (Crown, 1995), OCLC 28709363; Running Press Kids; New Ed edition, 2003
- Pockets, by Jennifer Armstrong (Knopf Books for Young Readers, 1998)
- The House of Wisdom, by Florence Parry Heide and J. Heide Gilliland (DK Children, 1999)
- The Sea Chest, by Toni Buzzeo (Dial, 2002)
- Henry and Pawl and the Round Yellow Ball, co-written with her husband, Tom Casmer (Dial, 2005), LCCN 2003-2355
- Sweep Dreams, by Nancy Willard (Little, Brown Young Readers, 2005)
- Lucia and the Light, by Phyllis Root (Candlewick Press, 2006)
- Aunt Claire's Yellow Beehive Hair, by Deborah Blumenthal (Pelican, 2007)
- The Blue Shoe, by Roderick Townley (Knopf, 2009)
- The Carnival of the Animals, by Jack Prelutsky and Camille Saint-Saens (Knopf, 2010)
- Nancy and Plum, by Betty MacDonald (Yearling, 2011)
- Flight of the Last Dragon, by Robert Burleigh (2012)
- Goodnight Little Me, by Jennifer Dewing (2013)
- The Noisy Paint Box: The Colors and Sounds of Kandinsky's Abstract Art, by Barb Rosenstock (Knopf, 2014) – about Wassily Kandinsky
- A Dragon's Guide to the Care and Feeding of Humans, by Joanne Ryder and Laurence Yep (2015)
- A Dragon's Guide to Making Your Human Smarter, by Joanne Ryder and Laurence Yep (2016)
- Cleonardo, the Little Inventor, by Mary GrandPré (2016)
- A Dragon's Guide to Making Perfect Wishes, by Joanne Ryder and Laurence Yep (2017)
- Vincent Can't Sleep: Van Gogh Paints the Night Sky, by Barb Rosenstock (Knopf, 2017)
- Through the Window: Views of Marc Chagall's Life and Art, by Barb Rosenstock (Knopf, 2018)
- How the Leopard Got His Claws, by Chinua Achebe (Candlewick, 2019), story originally published in 1972
- All Welcome Here, by James Preller (2020)
- Mornings with Monet, by Barb Rosenstock (Knopf, 2021)
