= Étienne-François de Lantier =

French writer and playwright (1734–1826)

Étienne-François de Lantier (1 October 1734, Marseille – 31 January 1826, Marseille) was an 18th-century French writer and playwright.

== Works ==
- 1768: L’Impatient, one-act comedy, Online
- 1782: Le Flatteur comedy in 5 acts composed with La Reynière : Online
- 1784: Travaux de l’abbé Mouche
- 1798: Voyages d’Anténor en Grèce et en Asie avec des notions sur l’Égypte, Online tome 1, tome 2 & tome 3
- 1803: Les voyageurs en Suisse
- 1809: Voyage en Espagne du chevalier Saint-Gervais, officier français, Online tome 1 & tome 2
- 1817: Recueil de poésies
- 1825: Geoffroy Rudel ou le troubadour poème en 8 chants, Online

His complete works were published in Paris at Auguste Desrez and Arthus Bertrand in 1836–1837, reworked and collected by Pierre-Joseph Charrin, preceded by a biographical notice by Gaston de Flotte.

== Bibliography ==
- Jean Chrétien Ferdinand Hoefer: Nouvelle biographie générale depuis les temps les plus reculés jusqu'à nos jours, Firmin -Didot
- Jean Baptiste Lautard: Histoire de l'Académie de Marseille, depuis sa fondation en 1726
