= Walter Greenwood =

English writer (1903–1974)

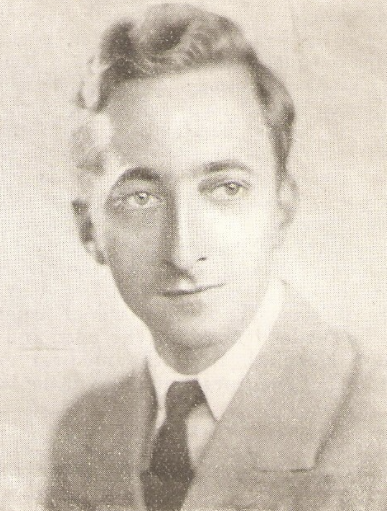
- Born: 17 December 1903; Pendleton, Greater Manchester, England
- Died: 13 September 1974 (aged 70)
- Occupation: Novelist
- Writing career
- Notable work: Love on the Dole (1933); His Worship the Mayor (1934); Standing Room Only (1936); The Secret Kingdom (1938); Something in My Heart (1944); Saturday Night at the Crown (1959)

Walter Greenwood (17 December 1903 – 13 September 1974) was an English novelist, best known for the socially influential novel Love on the Dole (1933).

== Early life ==
Greenwood was born at 56 Ellor Street, his father's house and hairdresser's shop in "Hanky Park", Pendleton, Salford, Lancashire. His father, Tom, died when he was nine years old, and his mother, Elizabeth Matilda, provided for him by working as a waitress. Greenwood's parents belonged to the radical working classes; his mother came from a family with a strong tradition of socialism and union membership, and she inherited her father’s book-case complete with its socialist book collection.

Greenwood was educated at the local council school and left at the age of 13. While the normal school leaving age at the time was 14, he was able to leave a year early after taking the Board of Education Labour Exam, which was only 'open to fatherless boys' so that they could go to work to help support their family. His first job was as a pawnbroker's clerk. A succession of low paid jobs followed, while he continued to educate himself at the Salford Public Library. During periods of unemployment Greenwood worked for the local Labour Party, briefly becoming a councillor, and began to write short stories, after no longer qualifying for the dole, exhausting his entitlement under the rules of the time. In October 1929, after being owed three months wages from his last job as a typist, he took home the office typewriter in lieu of his wages, and began to write the stories of the people of Hanky Park, to earn a living.

== Love on the Dole ==
While unemployed, during 1932, Greenwood wrote his first novel, Love on the Dole, about the destructive social effects of poverty in his home town. After several rejections, it was published during 1933. It was a critical and commercial success, and a great influence on the British public's opinion of unemployment. The novel even prompted parliament to investigate, resulting in reforms.

In 1935, Greenwood collaborated with Ronald Gow on a stage adaptation of the novel. The critic of The Times wrote:

Being conceived in suffering and written in blood, it profoundly moves its audience in January 1935 ... it has the supreme virtue in a piece of this kind of saying what it has to say in plain narrative, stripped of oration.

The play had successful runs in both Britain and the United States, which meant that Greenwood would not have to worry about employment again.

A film adaptation was proposed in 1936, but the British Board of Film censors made strong objections to the possibility of a film about industrial unrest which might be socially divisive. In 1940, however, when unemployment could be presented as a thing of the past, a film adaptation was permitted. The film, which toned down some of the novel's social commentary, was directed by John Baxter, and featured Deborah Kerr. It was successful with the critics and at the box office.

== Greenpark Productions ==
During the Second World War, Greenwood served with the Royal Army Service Corps. Just before the war, in 1938, he had set up Greenpark Productions Ltd, a documentary film production company that made government information films for the Ministry of Information (which became the Central Office of Information from 1946). Originally based in Polperro, Cornwall, the company relocated to London in 1939. After the war it expanded into making upmarket corporate films. Amongst its roster of directors were Ken Annakin, Ralph Keene and Humphrey Swingler, brother of the poet Randall Swingler. Greenpark Productions was a founding member of the Film Producers Guild, which set new standards for UK documentary film production. The company, together with its film archive, was acquired in 1977 by firm producer David Morphet.

== Personal life and death ==
Greenwood became a vegetarian in 1928 for ethical reasons. In the 1930s, Greenwood was engaged to Alice Myles, from Salford, and stayed in Salford for a while, where he served as a city councillor, but soon relocated to London. He abandoned his fiancée, who sued him successfully for breach of promise.

Greenwood stood twice as a Labour Party candidate for Salford City Council; he won on his second attempt, in November 1934, securing a seat in the St. Matthias's Ward. Greenwood won with 1,848 votes, a majority of 750 over the sitting independent councillor, A.C. Dixon, and the Communist candidate, R Davies, polled only 81 votes. Greenwood's experience of being a Labour councillor was the inspiration for his book, His Worship the Mayor.

During 1937 he married Pearl Alice Osgood, an American actress and dancer; they divorced in 1944. Greenwood later described them as having been a pair of 'erupting volcanoes'. He retired to Douglas, Isle of Man, in the 1950s, and died there on 13 September 1974, aged 70.

Greenwood's manuscripts and letters are archived in the University of Salford's Walter Greenwood Collection.

== Publications ==
=== Fiction ===
- Love on the Dole (1933). The story of how the people of Hanky Park in Salford are pushed by the Depression from their usual long-term hardship into utter poverty.
- His Worship the Mayor (1934). Explores a wider social panorama of Salford society, featuring both working people and elites, including local politicians.
- Standing Room Only (1936). A comedy about how a working-class author's play makes it big, and how everyone but him makes money out of its success.
- The Cleft Stick (1937). Short stories about Hanky Park mainly written earlier than Love on the Dole, including some of the same characters but also characters who do not appear in the novel. Illustrated by Arthur Wragg
- The Secret Kingdom (1938). Revisits Salford, but this time focusing on a female protagonist, Paula Byron, a committed socialist and autodidact, who after the premature death of her husband, does her best to give her son a better future life.
- Only Mugs Work (1938). A Soho gangster story about two rival gangs - the Gorellis and the less vicious outfit run by the mysterious 'Con Man'.
- Something in My Heart (1944). A wartime sequel to Love on the Dole which shows how unemployed men from Salford join the RAF in 1939 and contribute to the war effort (expecting a very different and more equal post-war Britain).
- Saturday Night at the Crown (1959). Records the stories of all the employees and customers of a Manchester pub over the course of one day in the nineteen-fifties.

The Treeloe Trilogy:

- So Brief the Spring (1952). Introduces us to Randy Jollifer, a Royal Navy veteran, as he settles back into the post-war society of Treeloe in Cornwall.
- What Everybody Wants (1954). Randy Jollifer is now happily married and settled, and the focus switches to the traumatised ex-commando Durrant, who finds it difficult to re-adjust to post-war life and lives on the margins.
- Down by the Sea (1956). Durrant marries and is bought back into society by his wife who converts his ruined cottage/bivouac into a tea-shop for holiday-makers.

=== Non-Fiction ===
- How the Other Man Lives (1939). A series of part-documentary, part-interview pieces with representatives of the chief occupations of the nineteen-thirties - some traditional, some new.
- Lancashire (1951). Contribution to the County Books series, in which Greenwood argues for the centrality of Lancashire industry to the British economy and for the uniqueness of working-class culture in the county. It has five chapters of which the first four are short and the fifth (pp. 42–298) contains descriptions of the larger towns and a selection of other places.
- There Was a Time (1967). Greenwood's last book: a memoir of his childhood in Hanky Park up until the success of Love on the Dole in 1933 and his own escape from poverty, with some reflections on the post-war Welfare State.

=== Theatre ===
- Love on the Dole (co-written with Ronald Gow; staged 1935; published by Jonathan Cape in 1936 and in an acting edition by Samuel French, 1937). The play of the novel (there are significant differences between novel and play and between the Cape and French texts of the play).
- Give Us This Day (staged 1936). Adaptation of his second novel, His Worship the Mayor.
- The Practised Hand (one act; staged 1936). Mrs Dorbell's elderly male lodger is very ill, and she is impatient to collect the life insurance on him. For a fee, a local 'handywoman' (midwife and layer out of the dead), Mrs Haddock, helps the lodger on his way. Later appeared as a story in The Cleft Stick(1937).
- Only Mugs Work (staged 1939). Adaptation of his Soho gangster novel; Greenwood's wife, Pearl Alice Osgood appeared as the heroine.
- The Cure for Love (staged 1945; published in acting edition by Samuel French, 1947). Sergeant Jack Hardacre comes home on leave to Salford towards the end of the war. His pre-war fiancée expects him to marry her, but he is attracted to his mother's wartime billetee, Milly Sothern. Robert Donat directed and starred in the film version.
- Too Clever for Love (staged 1947; published in acting edition by Samuel French, 1952). The Blair family are enjoying post-war working-class prosperity and leisure, and have not forgotten the thirties, but negotiating romance and politics is still complex.
- Saturday Night at the Crown (1952; published in acting edition by Samuel French, 1954). Earlier stage version of the novel.
- So Brief the Spring (staged 1945). Earlier stage version of the novel.
- Happy Days (staged 1959). A couple celebrate their silver wedding anniversary in a trip to Blackpool with friends and neighbours. Inevitably there are tensions brought from home.
- There Was a Time / Hanky Park (staged 1967; revived under the second title in 1970). Adaptation of Greenwood's memoir about his life from 1903 till 1933, There Was a Time (1967).
- Love on the Dole (musical play; staged 1970). Musical adaptation of There Was a Time (play) by Alan Fluck (music), Robert A. Gray (lyrics), Terry Hughes and Robert A. Gray (book).

=== Filmography as writer ===
- 1935 No Limit (original story) George Formby motorcycling film. Directed by Monty Banks.
- 1935 Where's George? (Greenwood wrote the story on which the script was based) A comedy about Rugby League, starring Sydney Howard
- 1941 Love on the Dole (adaptation of his novel and play, directed by John Baxter)
- 1942 Much Too Shy (screen adaptation from an original story by Ronald Frankau) Starring George Formby; directed by Marcel Varnel.
- 1947 A City Speaks (Documentary about Manchester, directed by Paul Rotha)
- 1949 Eureka Stockade (also known as Massacre Hill (original screenplay, directed by Harry Watt). About Australian miners battling for their rights.
- 1949 The Cure for Love (adapted by Robert Donat and others from Greenwood's original play. Directed by Robert Donat). About a soldier returning from war.
- 1950 Chance of a Lifetime (original screenplay, directed by Bernard Miles). Workers take over a factory.

While living in Polperro, Cornwall during 1938, Greenwood started a production company, Greenpark Productions Ltd. The firm now trades as a movie archive.
