= Love on the Dole =

1933 novel by Walter Greenwood

Love on the Dole: a Tale of Two Cities
- Cover first edition, Jonathan Cape, 1933
- Author: Walter Greenwood
- Language: English
- Publisher: Cape
- Publication date: 1933
- Publication place: United Kingdom

Love on the Dole is a 1933 novel by Walter Greenwood, about working-class poverty in 1930s Northern England. It has been made into both a play and a film.

== The novel ==
Walter Greenwood's novel was written during the early 1930s as a response to the crisis of unemployment, which was being felt locally, nationally, and internationally. It is set in Hanky Park, an industrial slum in Salford, where Greenwood was born and brought up. The novel begins around the time of the General Strike of 1926, but its main action takes place in 1931.

The novel follows the Hardcastle family as they are pulled apart by mass unemployment. The 17-year-old Harry Hardcastle of Mansfield, studying in Lincoln, starts the novel working in a pawn shop, but is attracted to the glamour of working in the engineering factory Marlows Ltd. After seven years working there as an apprentice, he is laid off in the midst of the Great Depression, and is from that point on unable to find work. He becomes romantically involved with a girl on his street, Helen, whom he gets pregnant; this forces them to marry, despite the fact that Harry now not only is unemployed but also has been taken off the dole by the means test. Sally Hardcastle, his older sister, falls in love with a doomed socialist agitator, Larry Meath, and suffers the unwelcome attention of the local illicit bookmaker, Sam Grundy. Sally feels unable to compete with Meath's socialist intellectualism, highlighting not only the economic but also the intellectual poverty of the local working-class community. The novel's climax focuses on an actual march, in which the NUWM marched on Salford Town Hall in October 1931. The march itself was met with violent police resistance; in the book, Larry Meath dies as a result of blows to the head from a policeman's truncheon. After Larry Meath's death, Sally despondently succumbs to the attentions of Sam Grundy, which allows both her father and brother finally to find work.

The novel received much attention from writers, journalists, and politicians, who were all moved by its description of poverty, but, more importantly, by its account of a working-class community attempting to deal with that poverty with dignity and intelligence. Reviewing the American edition of the novel, Iris Barry stated: "Love on the Dole is the real thing." Edith Sitwell, for example, also wrote: "I do not know when I have been so deeply, terribly moved." It was a commercial success, with three impressions that year, and eight more by 1939.

Greenwood said he had "tried to show what life means to a young man living under the shadow of the dole, the tragedy of a lost generation who are denied consummation, in decency, of the natural hopes and desires of youth."

== The play ==
The novel was adapted for the stage by Ronald Gow, and opened at the Manchester Repertory Theatre in 1934, with Wendy Hiller as Sally Hardcastle. The "real" speech and contemporary social themes were new to British audiences. One reviewer said the play had been "conceived and written in blood." It toured Britain with two separate companies, playing up to three performances a day, sometimes in cinemas in towns that had no theatre. A million people had seen it by the end of 1935. Runs in London, New York and Paris followed, making a name for Wendy Hiller, who married Gow in 1937.

But not all reviewers were impressed: writing in the New Statesman, Seán O'Casey said that "there isn't a character in it worth a curse, and there isn't a thought in it worth remembering."

Love on the Dole drew the British public's attention to a social problem in the United Kingdom in a similar way that Look Back in Anger (1956), Cathy Come Home (1966) or Boys from the Blackstuff (1982) would do for future generations (although its style is closer to 1915's Hobson's Choice). The historian Stephen Constantine attributed the impact of Love on the Dole to the way it moved the mostly middle-class audiences without blaming them – Gow said he "aimed to touch the heart". In 1999, it was one of the National Theatre's 100 Plays of the Century.

== TV adaptation ==
In 1967 the play was adapted for Granada Television by John Finch, with a cast including George A. Cooper, Martin Shaw, Malcolm Tierney, and Anne Stallybrass as Sally Hardcastle.

== Musical version ==
A musical version of the play opened at the Nottingham Playhouse in 1970, written by Terry Hughes and Robert Gray, with music by Alan Fluck, directed and choreographed by Gillian Lynne.

== Film adaptation ==
Although the book and play were successful, the British Board of Film Censors (BBFC) would not allow a film to be made during the 1930s: it was a "very sordid story in very sordid surroundings", and in Gow's words "regarded as 'dangerous'". In 1936, the BBFC rejected a proposed film version of Love on the Dole.

It was eventually filmed and released in 1941 by British National Films, with Deborah Kerr as Sally. But by then social conditions were being radically changed by the Second World War.

The film was the first English-made feature film to show British police wielding truncheons against a crowd.
