= The Two Tickets Puzzle =

1930 novel

- Author: J.J. Connington
- Language: English
- Series: Superintendent Ross
- Genre: Detective
- Publisher: Gollancz
- Publication date: 1930
- Publication place: United Kingdom
- Media type: Print
- Preceded by: The Eye in the Museum

The Two Tickets Puzzle is a 1930 detective novel by the British author Alfred Walter Stewart, published under his pseudonym J.J. Connington. It was the second and last book featuring Superintendent Ross, an attempt to replace the author's better-known series character Sir Clinton Driffield who returned in Connington's next novel The Boathouse Riddle. With its story of a police detective trying to break down an alibi using railway timetables, it resembled the style of Freeman Wills Crofts' Inspector French series. Dorothy L. Sayers used a similar plot for her 1931 novel Five Red Herrings, and references Connington's novel in the dialogue.

== Synopsis ==
A mean-spirited businessman Oswald Preston is discovered shot dead under the seat in an empty compartment of a railway carriage. While there seem to be several people who potentially bore him a grudge, including; his wife, his ward, a former employee, and his wife's alleged lover a prominent local doctor. Yet it is almost impossible to see how anyone could have committed the murder while the train was in motion between two stations.

Ross and his men set about a lengthy, painstaking task of checking all the train tickets of those passengers travelling on the train. Eventually, the work pays off and they are able to unmask the murderer and give chase as he attempts to escape.

== Bibliography ==
- Barzun, Jacques & Taylor, Wendell Hertig. A Catalogue of Crime. Harper & Row, 1989.
- Carter, Ian. Railways and Culture in Britain: The Epitome of Modernity. Manchester University Press, 2001.
- Evans, Curtis. Masters of the "Humdrum" Mystery: Cecil John Charles Street, Freeman Wills Crofts, Alfred Walter Stewart and the British Detective Novel, 1920-1961. McFarland, 2014.
- Hubin, Allen J. Crime Fiction, 1749-1980: A Comprehensive Bibliography. Garland Publishing, 1984.
- Reilly, John M. Twentieth Century Crime & Mystery Writers. Springer, 2015.
