= The Dangerfield Talisman =

1926 novel

- Author: J.J. Connington
- Language: English
- Genre: Detective
- Publisher: Ernest Benn
- Publication date: 1926
- Publication place: United Kingdom
- Media type: Print

The Dangerfield Talisman is a 1926 mystery detective novel by the British writer Alfred Walter Stewart, published under his pen name J.J. Connington. It was his second entry into the genre following his debut Death at Swaythling Court. Notably the plot revolves around the disappearance of a family heirloom rather than a murder. The following year he wrote Murder in the Maze the first in a series of novels featuring Sir Clinton Driffield, one of the Golden Age Detectives.

== Bibliography ==
- Barzun, Jacques & Taylor, Wendell Hertig. A Catalogue of Crime. Harper & Row, 1989.
- Evans, Curtis. Masters of the "Humdrum" Mystery: Cecil John Charles Street, Freeman Wills Crofts, Alfred Walter Stewart and the British Detective Novel, 1920-1961. McFarland, 2014.
- Reilly, John M. Twentieth Century Crime & Mystery Writers. Springer, 2015.
