= The Pit-Prop Syndicate =

1922 novel

- Author: Freeman Wills Crofts
- Language: English
- Genre: Thriller
- Publisher: Collins
- Publication date: 1922
- Publication place: United Kingdom
- Media type: Print

The Pit-Prop Syndicate is a 1922 thriller novel by Freeman Wills Crofts, one of the leading figures of the Golden Age of Detective Fiction. It was one of several stand-alone novels Crofts wrote following his successful debut The Cask, before creating the character of Inspector French who debuted in Inspector French's Greatest Case (1924).

== Synopsis ==
A boat notionally carrying pit props from the Gironde to the Humber is in fact engaging in illegal smuggling. This leads on to a murder in a London taxi and an investigation by the slow but sure Inspector Willis of Scotland Yard.

== Bibliography ==
- Evans, Curtis. Masters of the "Humdrum" Mystery: Cecil John Charles Street, Freeman Wills Crofts, Alfred Walter Stewart and the British Detective Novel, 1920-1961. McFarland, 2014.
- Reilly, John M. Twentieth Century Crime & Mystery Writers. Springer, 2015.
