= The Eye in the Museum =

1929 novel

- American edition
- Author: J.J. Connington
- Language: English
- Series: Superintendent Ross
- Genre: Detective
- Publisher: Gollancz
- Publication date: 1929
- Publication place: United Kingdom
- Media type: Print
- Followed by: The Two Tickets Puzzle

The Eye in the Museum is a 1929 detective novel by the British author Alfred Walter Stewart, published under his pseudonym J.J. Connington. It was the first of two books featuring Superintendent Ross, a brief attempt by the author to replace his best-known character Chief Constable Sir Clinton Driffield. Ross is similar in type to the contemporary Inspector French created by Freeman Wills Crofts. The title is a play on words referring both to a glass eye that is a prominent part of the museum's collection and a camera obscura on the top of the building which provides a vital evidence allowing Ross to solve the case.

== Synopsis ==
The novel takes place in a small, English town with a river and a museum containing a relatively dull collection of objections. After Mrs. Fenton is found dead the initial assumption that it was of natural causes soon gives way to evidence that she was murdered. An unpleasant woman who drunk and gambled heavily, she had a number of enemies. Suspicion falls on her niece who she tyrannises and whose inheritance she controls for her own benefit until her twenty fifth birthday. Ross methodically works through the other list of those who had either the motive or the means of killing her, including her former husband and the doctor with whom she has been having an affair. Only after a second murder does the case become fully clear.

== Bibliography ==
- Evans, Curtis. Masters of the "Humdrum" Mystery: Cecil John Charles Street, Freeman Wills Crofts, Alfred Walter Stewart and the British Detective Novel, 1920-1961. McFarland, 2014.
- Herbert, Rosemary. Whodunit?: A Who's Who in Crime & Mystery Writing. Oxford University Press, 2003.
- Hubin, Allen J. Crime Fiction, 1749-1980: A Comprehensive Bibliography. Garland Publishing, 1984.
- Nym Mayhall, Laura E. & Prevost Elizabeth. British Murder Mysteries, 1880-1965: Facts and Fictions. Springer Nature, 2022.
- Reilly, John M. Twentieth Century Crime & Mystery Writers. Springer, 2015.
