= For Murder Will Speak =

1938 novel

- Author: J.J. Connington
- Language: English
- Series: Sir Clinton Driffield
- Genre: Detective
- Publisher: Hodder and Stoughton
- Publication date: 1938
- Publication place: United Kingdom
- Media type: Print
- Preceded by: Truth Comes Limping
- Followed by: The Twenty-One Clues

For Murder Will Speak is a 1938 detective novel by the British author Alfred Walter Stewart, published under his pseudonym J.J. Connington. It is the thirteenth in a series of novels featuring the Golden Age Detective Chief Constable Sir Clinton Driffield. The title references a line from Shakespeare's Hamlet. It was released in the United States by Little, Brown and Company under the alternative title Murder Will Speak.

After the novel Connington took a brief break from Driffield and produced two books The Counsellor and The Four Defences with a new detective, radio personality Mark Brand, as the lead character.

== Synopsis ==
A series of poison pen letters disrupt the harmony of an English town. An embezzling manager at a financial company, spending his spare time trying to conduct multiple romantic affairs, comes under scrutiny. However it is the unexplained death of a young woman in Scotland that slowly begins to unravel the case. When the cheating manager is then found dead, the two cases begin to merge.

== Bibliography ==
- Evans, Curtis. Masters of the "Humdrum" Mystery: Cecil John Charles Street, Freeman Wills Crofts, Alfred Walter Stewart and the British Detective Novel, 1920-1961. McFarland, 2014.
- Hubin, Allen J. Crime Fiction, 1749-1980: A Comprehensive Bibliography. Garland Publishing, 1984.
- Murphy, Bruce F. The Encyclopedia of Murder and Mystery. Springer, 1999.
- Reilly, John M. Twentieth Century Crime & Mystery Writers. Springer, 2015.
