= The Groote Park Murder =

1923 novel

- First edition (3rd impression 1925)
- Author: Freeman Wills Crofts
- Language: English
- Genre: Detective
- Publisher: Collins
- Publication date: 1923
- Publication place: United Kingdom
- Media type: Print

The Groote Park Murder is a 1923 detective novel by Freeman Wills Crofts, one of the leading figures of the Golden Age of Detective Fiction. It was one of several stand-alone novels Crofts wrote following his successful debut The Cask, before creating the character of Chief Inspector French who debuted the following year in Inspector French's Greatest Case.

== Synopsis ==
When a dead body is found in a railway tunnel in South Africa, the local police investigation at first points towards an accidental death. However, a second almost identical killing in the Scottish Highlands appears to point towards murder.

== Bibliography ==
- Evans, Curtis. Masters of the "Humdrum" Mystery: Cecil John Charles Street, Freeman Wills Crofts, Alfred Walter Stewart and the British Detective Novel, 1920-1961. McFarland, 2014.
- Reilly, John M. Twentieth Century Crime & Mystery Writers. Springer, 2015.
