= In Whose Dim Shadow =

1935 novel

- Author: J.J. Connington
- Language: English
- Series: Sir Clinton Driffield
- Genre: Detective
- Publisher: Hodder and Stoughton
- Publication date: 1935
- Publication place: United Kingdom
- Media type: Print
- Preceded by: The Ha-Ha Case
- Followed by: A Minor Operation

In Whose Dim Shadow is a 1935 detective novel written by the British author Alfred Walter Stewart, published under his pseudonym J.J. Connington. It is the tenth in his series of novels featuring the Golden Age Detective Chief Constable Sir Clinton Driffield, the Chief Constable of a rural English county. The title comes from a line in The Battle of Lake Regillus in Thomas Babington Macaulay's Lays of Ancient Rome. It was published in the United States by Little, Brown under the alternative title The Tau Cross Mystery.

== Synopsis ==
A man is shot dead in an empty apartment in the block of flats where he lives. Investigations soon prove he was a leading a double life, married to two different woman and a victim of blackmail. It appears he lay in wait in an attempt to kill his blackmailer, but was got at first. Sir Clinton tries to whittle down those potentially linked to the crime including the dead man's original French wife, her brother-in-law, a charismatic young clergyman and a freelance journalist.

== Bibliography ==
- Barzun, Jacques & Taylor, Wendell Hertig. A Catalogue of Crime. Harper & Row, 1989.
- Evans, Curtis. Masters of the "Humdrum" Mystery: Cecil John Charles Street, Freeman Wills Crofts, Alfred Walter Stewart and the British Detective Novel, 1920-1961. McFarland, 2014.
- Hubin, Allen J. Crime Fiction, 1749-1980: A Comprehensive Bibliography. Garland Publishing, 1984.
- Murphy, Bruce F. The Encyclopedia of Murder and Mystery. Springer, 1999.
- Reilly, John M. Twentieth Century Crime & Mystery Writers. Springer, 2015.
