= Golden Ashes (novel) =

1940 novel

- First edition (UK)
- Author: Freeman Wills Crofts
- Language: English
- Series: Inspector French
- Genre: Mystery
- Publisher: Hodder and Stoughton (UK); Dodd Mead (US)
- Publication date: 1940
- Publication place: United Kingdom
- Media type: Print
- Preceded by: Fatal Venture
- Followed by: James Tarrant, Adventurer

Golden Ashes is a 1940 detective novel by the Irish writer Freeman Wills Crofts. It is the twentieth in his series of novels featuring Inspector French, a prominent investigator of the Golden Age of Detective Fiction.

== Synopsis ==
Following her husband's death that has left her in financial difficulties, Betty Stanton takes the post of housekeeper at Forde Manor in Surrey. Forde Manor has recently been inherited along with a baronetcy by Sir Geoffrey Buller. Buller has spent most of his life living in Chicago where he has been a property speculator. Frustrated by his attempts to try and ingratiate himself into local high society Buller decides to sell his property and move to the Continent. Everything in the house is sold off and removed apart from the valuable art collection.

One evening Stanton discovers the building is on fire, and her efforts to save the paintings is largely unsuccessful. This and the discovery shortly afterwards of the body of an art expert who had recently valued the collection draws the investigation of both Inspector French and the insurance company.

== Bibliography ==
- Evans, Curtis. Masters of the "Humdrum" Mystery: Cecil John Charles Street, Freeman Wills Crofts, Alfred Walter Stewart and the British Detective Novel, 1920-1961. McFarland, 2014.
- Herbert, Rosemary. Whodunit?: A Who's Who in Crime & Mystery Writing. Oxford University Press, 2003.
- Reilly, John M. Twentieth Century Crime & Mystery Writers. Springer, 2015.
