= Jack-in-the-Box (novel) =

1944 novel

- Author: J.J. Connington
- Language: English
- Series: Sir Clinton Driffield
- Genre: Detective
- Publisher: Hodder and Stoughton
- Publication date: 1944
- Publication place: United Kingdom
- Media type: Print
- Preceded by: No Past Is Dead
- Followed by: Common Sense Is All You Need

Jack-in-the-Box is a 1944 detective novel by the British author Alfred Walter Stewart, published under his pseudonym J.J. Connington. It is the sixteenth in his series of novels featuring the Golden Age Detective Sir Clinton Driffield, the Chief Constable of a rural English county. It was published by Hodder and Stoughton in London and Little, Brown and Company in the United States. Writing in The New York Times Isaac Anderson felt that "to appreciate this story fully one should either be well grounded in science or take Sir Clinton’s explanations on trust".

== Synopsis ==
In 1942, at the height of the Second World War, German bombs are raining down on Ambledown to try and knock out a munitions factory. One bomb lands some way outside the town, causing a large crater close to the location of a former Roman camp. Recent archaeological research has unearthed an ancient hoard on a patch of land earmarked for potential development for the expanding town. Soon afterwards the archaeologist leading the excavation is killed in an air raid.

However doubts remain about the case and the possibility of murder arises. The land set aside for redevelopment is owned in trust for the grandchildren of an earlier developer of the town. One by one they begin to die off in inexplicable circumstances. Yet the potential profits of any land sales still seem a poor motive even for the dwindling number of heirs. It is only when Sir Clinton realises that the air strike has unearthed the potentially lucrative presence of vast deposits of tin (now in short supply due to the loss of Malaya to Japanese forces) that the reason for the killings makes sense. Matters are complicated by one of the beneficiaries, a Liberian confidence trickster who claims to have occult powers that Sir Clinton is ultimately able to debunk.

== Bibliography ==
- Barzun, Jacques & Taylor, Wendell Hertig. A Catalogue of Crime. Harper & Row, 1989.
- Evans, Curtis. Masters of the "Humdrum" Mystery: Cecil John Charles Street, Freeman Wills Crofts, Alfred Walter Stewart and the British Detective Novel, 1920-1961. McFarland, 2014.
- Hubin, Allen J. Crime Fiction, 1749-1980: A Comprehensive Bibliography. Garland Publishing, 1984.
- Murphy, Bruce F. The Encyclopedia of Murder and Mystery. Springer, 1999.
- Reilly, John M. Twentieth Century Crime & Mystery Writers. Springer, 2015.
