= The Cheyne Mystery =

1926 novel

- First edition cover
- Author: Freeman Wills Crofts
- Language: English
- Series: Inspector French
- Genre: Mystery
- Publisher: Collins
- Publication date: 1926
- Publication place: United Kingdom
- Media type: Print
- Preceded by: Inspector French's Greatest Case
- Followed by: The Starvel Tragedy

The Cheyne Mystery (also known as Inspector French and The Cheyne Mystery) is a 1926 mystery thriller novel by Freeman Wills Crofts. It is the second in his series of novels featuring Inspector French, a prominent figure of the Golden Age of Detective Fiction. It followed on from his debut in Inspector French's Greatest Case, in which Crofts introduced a character who was more methodical and less flamboyant than many of the other great detectives who followed in the wake of Sherlock Holmes.

== Synopsis ==
The novel takes place in 1920. Maxwell Cheyne, a First World War naval veteran and short story writer from Dartmouth, is lunching at a Plymouth hotel where he is doped and his home burgled. A few weeks later he is tricked onto a ship and held without food and water by a gang that is searching for a vital letter sent to Cheyne several years ago by a friend. After Cheyne hands over information about the letter, they put him ashore and threaten him to take no further interest in the matter. Instead he trails them, catching a train into London in pursuit where he tracks them down to a house in the under-construction Metroland suburb of Wembley. Attempting to steal back the contents of the letter he is coshed on the head by the gang and rescued by Joan Merrill, a young female artist from Chelsea who takes him to hospital and in search of excitement agrees to join his missions to recover the stolen letter which appears to contain some kind of ciphered code.

Only when the gang kidnap Joan and try to kill him with an explosive device that he narrowly escapes at Marylebone Station does Cheyne at last turn to Scotland Yard. He is fortunate that the understanding and thorough Inspector French is assigned to the case. His investigations soon take him to Bruges and then to Antwerp where he discovers that the gang have recently sailed on an expedition linked to the stolen letter. French now has to work out exactly what the coded cipher means and where the villains have taken the kidnapped woman. The key to the whole story seems to be with a dead German U-boat captain and the secret he passed on.

In the later novel Sir John Magill's Last Journey French mentions that Cheyne and Joan are now a happily married couple living in Dartmouth.

== Bibliography ==
- Evans, Curtis. Masters of the "Humdrum" Mystery: Cecil John Charles Street, Freeman Wills Crofts, Alfred Walter Stewart and the British Detective Novel, 1920-1961. McFarland, 2014.
- Herbert, Rosemary. Whodunit?: A Who's Who in Crime & Mystery Writing. Oxford University Press, 2003.
- Reilly, John M. Twentieth Century Crime & Mystery Writers. Springer, 2015.
