= Death at Swaythling Court =

1926 novel

- Author: J.J. Connington
- Language: English
- Genre: Detective
- Publisher: Ernest Benn
- Publication date: 1926
- Publication place: United Kingdom
- Media type: Print

Death at Swaythling Court is a 1926 mystery detective novel by the British writer Alfred Walter Stewart, published under his pseudonym J.J. Connington. It was Stewart's first attempt at a detective novel, having previously produced works including the 1923 science fiction novel Nordenholt's Million. It is a stand-alone novel, revolving around a country house mystery. The following year the author published Murder in the Maze, the first of seventeen novels featuring the Golden Age detective Sir Clinton Driffield, for which he is best-known.

== Synopsis ==
A newly wealthy man, who secretly funds his lifestyle as a blackmailer, moves into a rural district where he is deeply resented as an newcomer. When he is murdered, his neighbour Colonel Sanderstead sets out to solve the case moved partly in sympathy for those who may have committed the killing.

== Bibliography ==
- Barzun, Jacques & Taylor, Wendell Hertig. A Catalogue of Crime. Harper & Row, 1989.
- Benthal, J.C. Agatha Christie: A Companion to the Mystery Fiction. McFarland, 2022.
- Evans, Curtis. Masters of the "Humdrum" Mystery: Cecil John Charles Street, Freeman Wills Crofts, Alfred Walter Stewart and the British Detective Novel, 1920-1961. McFarland, 2014.
- Hubin, Allen J. Crime Fiction, 1749-1980: A Comprehensive Bibliography. Garland Publishing, 1984.
- Reilly, John M. Twentieth Century Crime & Mystery Writers. Springer, 2015.
