= The Counsellor =

The Counsellor may refer to:

- De optimo senatore, also known as The Counsellor, a 1598 book by Wawrzyniec Goślicki
- The Counsellor (novel), a 1939 detective novel by Alfred Walter Stewart
- The Counselor, a 2013 American crime thriller film
- Counselor at Crime, also known as The Counsellor, a 1973 Italian-Spanish crime film

== See also ==
- Counselor (disambiguation)
