= Circumstantial Evidence (disambiguation) =

Circumstantial evidence is a concept in law.

Circumstantial Evidence may also refer to:

- Circumstantial Evidence (1929 German film), a German silent crime film
- Circumstantial Evidence (1929 American film), an American melodrama film
- Circumstantial Evidence (1935 film), an American film
- Circumstantial Evidence (1945 film), a 1945 American film noir
- Circumstantial Evidence (1952 film), a British film
- Circumstantial Evidence (album), a 1987 Shalamar album
- Alternative title for the 1941 detective novel James Tarrant, Adventurer by Freeman Wills Crofts
