= Fatal Venture =

1939 novel

- Author: Freeman Wills Crofts
- Language: English
- Series: Inspector French
- Genre: Detective
- Publisher: Hodder and Stoughton (UK); Dodd Mead (US)
- Publication date: 1939
- Publication place: United Kingdom
- Media type: Print
- Preceded by: Antidote to Venom
- Followed by: Golden Ashes

Fatal Venture is a 1939 detective novel by the Irish writer Freeman Wills Crofts. It is the nineteenth in his series of novels featuring Chief Inspector French of Scotland Yard, a prominent investigator of the Golden Age of Detective Fiction. It was released in the United States by Dodd Mead under the alternative title Tragedy in the Hollow.

== Synopsis ==
On a train to Calais completing the final leg of a foreign tour, one of the passengers approaches Harry Morrison, the employee of the travel agency leading the party. He has an idea to create a company that provides cruise ship tours around the British Isles aimed at passengers on lower incomes who cannot afford expensive foreign travel. After some research, Morrison believes it is a viable scheme. However as they both lack the necessary finances, they approach one of the clients of the travel agency, the millionaire John Stott. Stott agrees to put up the money to acquire a transatlantic liner about to be broken up for scrap. He revises the scheme, moving it away from affordable packages towards expensive luxury for wealthier passengers. The crucial ingredient is the addition of gambling aboard, with a casino that can operate as the ship cruises just outside the three mile limit and therefore beyond the jurisdiction of British authorities.

The domineering Stott soon takes charge of the project, and lays out the funds. As well as being given a share in the profits, Morrison is employed as the head of the tourist section arranging excursions to various location in Great Britain and Ireland. The ship is refitted on the Clyde and then registered in France. It launches with great success, while also generating controversy amongst opponents to gambling. The ship proves to be very profitable, but as time passes Morrison and the other partner have still not received their share of the money.

Concerns about the damage the ship is doing to Britain's international reputation leads the Prime Minister and Home Secretary to approach the police to take action. Chief Inspector French is assigned to the case, booking a passage under an assumed name and taking his wife along with him for additional cover. He tries to discover evidence of lawbreaking that can have the gambling stopped, but everything is consistent with the law. He has not been aboard long when Stott goes missing during a visit to Portrush and Northern Ireland. An investigation by the RUC turns up the body in a hollow not far from Dunluce Castle. French is brought in to lead the shipboard investigation and is compelled to abandon his false identity.

To his discomfort it appears that Morrison, who he likes and is all but engaged to Stott's great niece, has been at the scene of the murder and lied about his presence. French works through the various alibis of the passengers, including two business partners who may have had a grudge against the late Stott. He continually draws a blank, as each possible suspect demonstrates their lack of opportunity or motive to commit the crime. Just as he is beginning to lose hope, French at last manages to crack the case by unravelling one of the complex alibis.

== Bibliography ==
- Evans, Curtis. Masters of the "Humdrum" Mystery: Cecil John Charles Street, Freeman Wills Crofts, Alfred Walter Stewart and the British Detective Novel, 1920-1961. McFarland, 2014.
- Herbert, Rosemary. Whodunit?: A Who's Who in Crime & Mystery Writing. Oxford University Press, 2003.
- Reilly, John M. Twentieth Century Crime & Mystery Writers. Springer, 2015.
