= The Twenty-One Clues =

1941 novel

- Author: J.J. Connington
- Language: English
- Series: Sir Clinton Driffield
- Genre: Detective
- Publisher: Hodder and Stoughton
- Publication date: 1941
- Publication place: United Kingdom
- Media type: Print
- Preceded by: For Murder Will Speak
- Followed by: No Past Is Dead

The Twenty-One Clues is a 1941 detective novel by the British author Alfred Walter Stewart, published under his pseudonym J.J. Connington. It is the fourteenth in a series of seventeen novels featuring the Golden Age Detective Sir Clinton Driffield, the Chief Constable of a rural English county. It was published by Hodder and Stoughton in London and Little, Brown and Company in the United States.

== Synopsis ==
Two bodies are spotted by an engine driver in some bracken close to the railway line. A man and a woman, unmarried to each other and rumoured to have had an affair despite their respectable backgrounds, have apparently taken part in a suicide pact.

== Bibliography ==
- Evans, Curtis. Masters of the "Humdrum" Mystery: Cecil John Charles Street, Freeman Wills Crofts, Alfred Walter Stewart and the British Detective Novel, 1920-1961. McFarland, 2014.
- Hubin, Allen J. Crime Fiction, 1749-1980: A Comprehensive Bibliography. Garland Publishing, 1984.
- Murphy, Bruce F. The Encyclopedia of Murder and Mystery. Springer, 1999.
- Reilly, John M. Twentieth Century Crime & Mystery Writers. Springer, 2015.
