= Anything to Declare? (novel) =

1957 novel

- First Edition (UK)
- Author: Freeman Wills Crofts
- Cover artist: Jarvis
- Language: English
- Series: Inspector French
- Genre: Detective
- Publisher: Hodder and Stoughton
- Publication date: 1957
- Publication place: United Kingdom
- Media type: Print
- Preceded by: French Strikes Oil

Anything to Declare? is a 1957 detective novel by Freeman Wills Crofts. It is the twenty ninth and final entry in his series of novels featuring Inspector French, a prominent figure of the Golden Age of Detective Fiction. The author had been in poor health for much of the decade, and struggled to finish this book which was published a few weeks before his death.

== Bibliography ==
- Evans, Curtis. Masters of the "Humdrum" Mystery: Cecil John Charles Street, Freeman Wills Crofts, Alfred Walter Stewart and the British Detective Novel, 1920-1961. McFarland, 2014.
- Herbert, Rosemary. Whodunit?: A Who's Who in Crime & Mystery Writing. Oxford University Press, 2003.
- Reilly, John M. Twentieth Century Crime & Mystery Writers. Springer, 2015.
