= Mystery in the Channel =

1931 novel

- First edition (UK)
- Author: Freeman Wills Crofts
- Language: English
- Series: Inspector French
- Genre: Mystery
- Publisher: Collins Crime Club (UK); Harper & Brothers (US)
- Publication date: 1931
- Publication place: United Kingdom
- Media type: Print
- Preceded by: Sir John Magill's Last Journey
- Followed by: Sudden Death

Mystery in the Channel is a 1931 detective novel by Freeman Wills Crofts. It is the seventh book in his series of novels featuring Inspector French of Scotland Yard, a prominent figure of the Golden Age of Detective Fiction known for his methodical technique. Like much of the series it features elements of police procedural, particularly the painstaking breaking down of alibis. It was published in America the same year by Harper under the altered title Mystery in the English Channel.

== Synopsis ==
During its regular Channel crossing the Newhaven-Dieppe Ferry encounters a yacht floating in its path. Further examination reveals that there are two dead bodies on board, both of whom have been shot. The yacht is taken back towards the English coast. On the way it is met by a launch, crewed only by an Irishman named Nolan who identifies the dead men and explains the background. All three are directors of a securities firm based in the City of London. They had been planning to rendezvous mid-channel and then head across to France to meet an important client.

The case is turned over to Scotland Yard and Inspector French appointed to the case. The fate of the two men is made more striking by disquieting rumours that the company is about to crash. The following day this indeed happens, the company has over eight million pounds sterling in liabilities which come due, and it folds ruining thousands of people and threatening to trigger a wider international financial collapse reminiscent of the recent Wall Street crash. Investigation proves that two other senior members of the company disappeared on the day of the murders.

French and his colleagues fail to find little initial evidence at the company's Threadneedle Street headquarters and he turns to examining the two vessels still lying in police custody at Newhaven. This leads him to Dieppe and other destinations on the French coast where it appears likely the murderer headed next. After encountering multiple false leads, French eventually establishes a theory that after realising that the company was beyond saving, the men had been raising what capital they could, investing it in diamonds, and then planning to make off and start new lives in Argentina. However, it seems one of them double-crossed the others and killed them in cold blood. Yet, everyone with any possible motive seems to have an unbreakable alibi.

== Bibliography ==
- Evans, Curtis. Masters of the "Humdrum" Mystery: Cecil John Charles Street, Freeman Wills Crofts, Alfred Walter Stewart and the British Detective Novel, 1920-1961. McFarland, 2014.
- Herbert, Rosemary. Whodunit?: A Who's Who in Crime & Mystery Writing. Oxford University Press, 2003.
- Reilly, John M. Twentieth Century Crime & Mystery Writers. Springer, 2015.
