= Death on the Way =

1932 novel

- First edition
- Author: Freeman Wills Crofts
- Language: English
- Series: Inspector French
- Genre: Mystery
- Publisher: Collins Crime Club (UK); Harper (US)
- Publication date: 1932
- Publication place: United Kingdom
- Media type: Print
- Preceded by: Sudden Death
- Followed by: The Hog's Back Mystery

Death on the Way is a 1932 detective novel by the Irish writer Freeman Wills Crofts. It is the ninth in his series of novels featuring Inspector French, a prominent figure of the Golden Age of Detective Fiction. It was published in the United States the same year by Harper under the alternative title Double Death.

The author drew on his own experience as a former railway engineer in creating the fictional project. In his next novel The Hog's Back Mystery he was to base the plot around a real-life road project.

== Synopsis ==
Contractors employed by the Southern Railway are working on a track widening scheme along the coast of Dorset. One evening one of the employees, a young engineer named Ronnie Ackerley is run over by a train on the route. The inquest initially considers it an accident, but subsequent information leads the local police to call in the assistance of Scotland Yard.

Inspector French's investigations establish quickly that it was indeed murder. A major scheme to defraud the railway company is also exposed, leading one of the employees to inflate the amount of work being done and pocket the difference. Then Carey, one of the other engineers, is found hanging in his office. The death is deemed a suicide and Carey is held responsible for both the fraud and for murdering Ackerley who was on the trail of uncovering it. This solution then unravels when French proves that Carey did not kill himself, but was also murdered.

== Bibliography ==
- Evans, Curtis. Masters of the "Humdrum" Mystery: Cecil John Charles Street, Freeman Wills Crofts, Alfred Walter Stewart and the British Detective Novel, 1920-1961. McFarland, 2014.
- Herbert, Rosemary. Whodunit?: A Who's Who in Crime & Mystery Writing. Oxford University Press, 2003.
- Reilly, John M. Twentieth Century Crime & Mystery Writers. Springer, 2015.
