= No Past Is Dead =

1942 novel

- American first edition
- Author: J.J. Connington
- Language: English
- Series: Sir Clinton Driffield
- Genre: Detective
- Publisher: Hodder and Stoughton
- Publication date: 1942
- Publication place: United Kingdom
- Media type: Print
- Preceded by: The Twenty-One Clues
- Followed by: Jack-in-the-Box

No Past Is Dead is a 1942 mystery detective novel by the British author Alfred Walter Stewart, published under his pseudonym J.J. Connington. It is the fifteenth in his series of novels featuring the Golden Age Detective Sir Clinton Driffield, the Chief Constable of a rural English county. It was published by Hodder and Stoughton in London and Little, Brown and Company in the United States.

== Synopsis ==
Police are called to a country estate by a housebreaker who, having cased the place, was about to burgle the place when he discovered a dead body close to the entrance. The man was apparently mauled to death by the pet cheetah of one of the owners who had to be shot by the police. Sir Clinton Driffield arrives to assist the inspector in charge of the case and is helped by some information he previously knew about the inhabitants of the place. It is soon clear that the dead man, a notorious and loathed moneylender, had his throat cut long before he was set about by the cheetah who was defending its mistress. More to the point, almost everyone who gives evidence to the police is exposed to be lying. The real origins of the case go back to the 1906 San Francisco Earthquake.

== Critical reception ==
Reception of the novel has been mixed. In a contemporary review in The New Statesman Ralph Partridge wrote "No Past is Dead has rather a tame plot, but is justified by one of the most wonderful alibis I have ever seen built up". While the same year in The Observer Maurice Richardson wrote "A welcome reappearance of Sir Clinton Driffield in Mr. J.J. Connington’s No Past is Dead. The suave, foxy chief constable has to solve a complex high-life-in-a-small-town murder case in which a moneylender is first shot and then mauled by a cheetah belonging to a Creole actress suffering from Jacksonian epilepsy. Interesting, close-knit investigation carefully worked out".

== Bibliography ==
- Barzun, Jacques & Taylor, Wendell Hertig. A Catalogue of Crime. Harper & Row, 1989.
- Evans, Curtis. Masters of the "Humdrum" Mystery: Cecil John Charles Street, Freeman Wills Crofts, Alfred Walter Stewart and the British Detective Novel, 1920-1961. McFarland, 2014.
- Hubin, Allen J. Crime Fiction, 1749-1980: A Comprehensive Bibliography. Garland Publishing, 1984.
- Murphy, Bruce F. The Encyclopedia of Murder and Mystery. Springer, 1999.
- Reilly, John M. Twentieth Century Crime & Mystery Writers. Springer, 2015.
