= Found Floating =

1937 novel

- First edition
- Author: Freeman Wills Crofts
- Language: English
- Series: Inspector French
- Genre: Mystery
- Publisher: Hodder and Stoughton
- Publication date: 1937
- Publication place: United Kingdom
- Media type: Print
- Preceded by: Man Overboard!
- Followed by: The End of Andrew Harrison

Found Floating is a 1937 detective novel by the Irish writer Freeman Wills Crofts. It is the sixteenth in his series of novels featuring Inspector French, a Scotland Yard detective of the Golden Age known for his methodical technique.

== Bibliography ==
- Evans, Curtis. Masters of the "Humdrum" Mystery: Cecil John Charles Street, Freeman Wills Crofts, Alfred Walter Stewart and the British Detective Novel, 1920-1961. McFarland, 2014.
- Herbert, Rosemary. Whodunit?: A Who's Who in Crime & Mystery Writing. Oxford University Press, 2003.
- Reilly, John M. Twentieth Century Crime & Mystery Writers. Springer, 2015.
