= The Losing Game =

1941 novel

- Author: Freeman Wills Crofts
- Language: English
- Series: Inspector French
- Genre: Mystery
- Publisher: Hodder and Stoughton (UK); Dodd Mead (US)
- Publication date: 1941
- Publication place: United Kingdom
- Media type: Print
- Preceded by: James Tarrant, Adventurer
- Followed by: Fear Comes to Chalfont

The Losing Game is a 1941 detective novel by the Anglo-Irish writer Freeman Wills Crofts. It is the twenty second in his series of novels featuring the Golden Age detective Inspector French of Scotland Yard. It was published in the United States by Dodd, Mead under the alternative title A Losing Game.

== Synopsis ==
At his cottage outside a town thirty miles west of London, a moneylender with a successful sideline in blackmail is murdered and his property set on fire. Police trawl through his various victims in order to hunt the killer down. Suspicion falls in particular on a detective novelist who was in debt to the dead man and he is arrested. His sister calls in the assistance of Inspector French who she had once met, and he unofficially makes some inquiries. This raises enough doubts for his superiors to agree to his taking on the case. With the novelist on remand on a charge for murder, French with assistance from the man's sister, is able to discover that the real killer's motive sprung from another crime committed many years before in Australia.

== Bibliography ==
- Evans, Curtis. Masters of the "Humdrum" Mystery: Cecil John Charles Street, Freeman Wills Crofts, Alfred Walter Stewart and the British Detective Novel, 1920–1961. McFarland, 2014.
- Herbert, Rosemary. Whodunit?: A Who's Who in Crime & Mystery Writing. Oxford University Press, 2003.
- Reilly, John M. Twentieth Century Crime & Mystery Writers. Springer, 2015.
