= The Box Office Murders =

1929 novel

- First edition
- Author: Freeman Wills Crofts
- Language: English
- Series: Inspector French
- Genre: Mystery
- Publisher: Collins
- Publication date: 1929
- Publication place: United Kingdom
- Media type: Print
- Preceded by: The Sea Mystery
- Followed by: Sir John Magill's Last Journey

The Box Office Murders is a 1929 detective novel by the Irish-born writer Freeman Wills Crofts. It is the fifth in his series of novels featuring Inspector French, a prominent figure of the Golden Age of Detective Fiction. It was published in the United States the same year by Harper under the alternative title The Purple Sickle Murders.

== Synopsis ==
French becomes involved in a case that sees several female cinema box office cashiers die in mysterious circumstances.

== Bibliography ==
- Evans, Curtis. Masters of the "Humdrum" Mystery: Cecil John Charles Street, Freeman Wills Crofts, Alfred Walter Stewart and the British Detective Novel, 1920-1961. McFarland, 2014.
- Herbert, Rosemary. Whodunit?: A Who's Who in Crime & Mystery Writing. Oxford University Press, 2003.
- Reilly, John M. Twentieth Century Crime & Mystery Writers. Springer, 2015.
