= Nemesis at Raynham Parva =

1929 novel

- American edition
- Author: J.J. Connington
- Language: English
- Series: Sir Clinton Driffield
- Genre: Detective
- Publisher: Gollancz
- Publication date: 1929
- Publication place: United Kingdom
- Media type: Print
- Preceded by: The Case with Nine Solutions
- Followed by: The Boathouse Riddle

Nemesis at Raynham Parva is a 1929 detective novel by the British author Alfred Walter Stewart, published under his pseudonym J.J. Connington. It is the fifth in his series of seventeen novels featuring the Golden Age Detective Sir Clinton Driffield. It was published in the United States by Little, Brown and Company under the alternative title Grim Vengeance.

It is a Country house mystery, a genre at its height during the interwar years. Connington possibly intended this to be the last Driffield novel, because it had shown Sir Clinton briefly crossing over to the other side of the law. Connington switched to a new series character Superintendent Ross for his next two novels, before bringing back Sir Clinton in a fresh story The Boathouse Riddle in 1931. Once again he is a Chief Constable and no mention is made of the events at Raynham Parva. In the following eleven stories he never behaves so high-handedly as he did in this case. The author later describe it as "rather a poor one" when assessing his works.

== Synopsis ==
Returning from a visit abroad Sir Clinton, recently having resigned from his post as Chief Constable, goes to stay at his widowed sister's rented country estate at Raynham Parva near a small village of the same name. He is concerned to discover that his niece has got married while he was away, not to Rex the likeable young man she has long been involved with but instead to Vicente Francia, a smooth-mannered Argentine. In just six weeks Francia is planning to take his niece away to Buenos Aires for good, taking away with her three other young English woman friends who are to accompany her to help her settle in to the new country.

Sir Clinton is called soon afterwards to give some assistance to Sergeant Ledbury of the local police on what looks like an accidental death in a car crash with the victim having gone headfirst through the windscreen. Sir Clinton quickly establishes that is in fact a murder cleverly disguised to make it look like an accident. Furthermore, the man was another South American, a vague business associate of Francia. Complicating matters is the presence of another Argentine, Doctor Roca staying at the local inn. Sir Clinton recognises him as a man who has worked for the League of Nations tackling people smuggling. Sir Clinton suspects that he has come to England in pursuit of the gang and has taken the law into his own hands and killed a man while disguising it as an accident.

When the doctor is found shot dead at a local megalithic structure, Sir Clinton is confirmed in his view that Francia is one of the smugglers, plotting to take the four young woman and sell them into White slavery across the Atlantic. He is caught in a dilemma of whether to expose Francia in England or in South America, where it may cause less scandal for his niece's reputation, ot take more drastic steps. When Francia is found shot dead in a room at Raynham Parva, it becomes clear that Sir Clinton himself has connived at his murder. Sergeant Ledbury is then steered onto entirely the wrong scent.

== Bibliography ==
- Barzun, Jacques & Taylor, Wendell Hertig. A Catalogue of Crime. Harper & Row, 1989.
- Evans, Curtis. Masters of the "Humdrum" Mystery: Cecil John Charles Street, Freeman Wills Crofts, Alfred Walter Stewart and the British Detective Novel, 1920-1961. McFarland, 2014.
- Hubin, Allen J. Crime Fiction, 1749-1980: A Comprehensive Bibliography. Garland Publishing, 1984.
- Murphy, Bruce F. The Encyclopedia of Murder and Mystery. Springer, 1999.
- Reilly, John M. Twentieth Century Crime & Mystery Writers. Springer, 2015.
