= Crime at Guildford =

1935 novel

- First edition
- Author: Freeman Wills Crofts
- Language: English
- Series: Inspector French
- Genre: Mystery
- Publisher: Collins Crime Club
- Publication date: 1935
- Publication place: United Kingdom
- Media type: Print
- Preceded by: Mystery on Southampton Water
- Followed by: The Loss of the Jane Vosper

Crime at Guildford is a 1935 detective novel by the writer Freeman Wills Crofts. Crofts was a leading figure of the Golden Age of Detective Fiction and often set his novels in Surrey where he lived close to Guildford. It was the thirteenth in a series of novels featuring Inspector French. It was published in America by Dodd Mead under the alternative title The Crime at Nornes.

== Synopsis ==
The accountant of a large but struggling firm of jewellers is murdered while attending a meeting at the managing director's house near Guildford, while at the same time a large robbery takes place at the firm's offices on Kingsway.

== Bibliography ==
- Evans, Curtis. Masters of the "Humdrum" Mystery: Cecil John Charles Street, Freeman Wills Crofts, Alfred Walter Stewart and the British Detective Novel, 1920-1961. McFarland, 2014.
- Reilly, John M. Twentieth Century Crime & Mystery Writers. Springer, 2015.
