= The Loss of the Jane Vosper =

1936 novel

- First edition
- Author: Freeman Wills Crofts
- Language: English
- Series: Inspector French
- Genre: Detective
- Publisher: Collins Crime Club (UK); Dodd, Mead (US)
- Publication date: 1936
- Publication place: United Kingdom
- Media type: Print
- Preceded by: Crime at Guildford
- Followed by: Man Overboard!

The Loss of the Jane Vosper (also written as The Loss of the 'Jane Vosper') is a 1936 detective novel by Freeman Wills Crofts. It is the fourteenth in his series of novels featuring Inspector French, a Scotland Yard detective of the Golden Age known for his thorough technique. It particularly dwells on the process of police procedure.

Comparing the novel to Margery Allingham's latest release Flowers for the Judge in his review for The Spectator, Cecil Day-Lewis writing under his pen name of Nicholas Blake commented "Mr. Crofts’s new book is excellent too. The loss at sea of the Jane Vosper, holed by mysterious explosions in the cargo, is so vividly described, indeed, that the sequel seems a little flat".

== Synopsis ==
During a trip from England to South America, the cargo ship Jane Vosper suffers from four mysterious explosions in her hull and the crew abandon ship shortly before she sinks. The insurance company covering an expensive part of the cargo are far from satisfied and before they pay out the £100,000 owed they engage Sutton, a trusted private detective, to investigate. When Sutton disappears a few days later Scotland Yard is called for and French takes over the case.

He traces the delivery of the valuable cargo from the Watford factory to the Pool of London where they were loaded onto the Jane Vosper. At first he can find no evidence either of a deliberate attempt to sink the Jane Vosper, or to murder Sutton. Eventually, with his customary painstaking work he discovers a plot linking stolen explosives from a quarry in Wales to a shed in the City of London where Sutton's buried body is found. It only now requires him to track down and arrest all those responsible.

== Bibliography ==
- Evans, Curtis. Masters of the "Humdrum" Mystery: Cecil John Charles Street, Freeman Wills Crofts, Alfred Walter Stewart and the British Detective Novel, 1920-1961. McFarland, 2014.
- Herbert, Rosemary. Whodunit?: A Who's Who in Crime & Mystery Writing. Oxford University Press, 2003.
- Reilly, John M. Twentieth Century Crime & Mystery Writers. Springer, 2015.
