= French Strikes Oil =

1951 novel

- First Edition (UK)
- Author: Freeman Wills Crofts
- Language: English
- Series: Inspector French
- Genre: Detective
- Publisher: Hodder and Stoughton (UK); Dodd Mead (US)
- Publication date: 1951
- Publication place: United Kingdom
- Media type: Print
- Preceded by: Silence for the Murderer
- Followed by: Anything to Declare?

French Strikes Oil is a 1951 detective novel by the Irish-born writer Freeman Wills Crofts. It is the twenty eighth and penultimate entry in his series of novels featuring Inspector French, a Scotland Yard detective of the Golden Age known for his methodical technique. It was published in the United States by Dodd Mead under the alternative title of Dark Journey.

No further French novel appeared for six years after this, although he featured in a short story collection The Mystery of the Sleeping Car Express published in 1956.

== Synopsis ==
French, now promoted to Superintendent, is called in to investigate the murder of Maurice Vale. Oil had recently been discovered on the family estate which promised to make them very wealthy. While Rodney Vale was keen to exploit the valuable new resources, his brother Maurice was strongly opposed due to the damage to the picturesque countryside. Maurice's death therefore potentially benefits several of his relatives. Curiously, French discovers two separate gloves by the body, one belonging to a man and one to a woman.

== Bibliography ==
- Evans, Curtis. Masters of the "Humdrum" Mystery: Cecil John Charles Street, Freeman Wills Crofts, Alfred Walter Stewart and the British Detective Novel, 1920-1961. McFarland, 2014.
- Herbert, Rosemary. Whodunit?: A Who's Who in Crime & Mystery Writing. Oxford University Press, 2003.
- Reilly, John M. Twentieth Century Crime & Mystery Writers. Springer, 2015.
