= The Hog's Back Mystery =

1933 mystery novel

- First edition (UK)
- Author: Freeman Wills Crofts
- Language: English
- Series: Inspector French
- Genre: Detective
- Publisher: Hodder and Stoughton (UK); Dodd, Mead (US)
- Publication date: 1933
- Publication place: United Kingdom
- Media type: Print
- Preceded by: Death on the Way
- Followed by: The 12.30 from Croydon

The Hog's Back Mystery (1933), also known as The Strange Case of Dr. Earle, is a "Golden Age" mystery novel by the Irish author Freeman Wills Crofts. It is the tenth novel in his Inspector French series. The novel is an early example of the police procedural subgenre of detective fiction. It was the first of Croft's books published by Hodder & Stoughton. It was reissued in 2015 by British Library Publishing.

== Plot summary ==
The story is set in the scenic North Downs of Surrey, on the ridge known as the Hog's Back, at the time of the building of the A31 bypass. Three school-friends, Julia Earle, her sister Marjorie Lawes, and Ursula Stone gather at Julia and Dr. James Earle's secluded cottage, St. Kilda, to share light-hearted reminiscences of their school-days. Ursula discovers that not only is Julia having an affair with her neighbour Reggie Slade, but that Dr. Earle has been seen in London with a mysterious woman, dressed in grey. As tensions mount, Dr. Earle disappears from his study in extraordinary circumstances: one minute he is sitting in his living room, comfortably settled with newspaper and slippers, and the next he has vanished. Despite the best efforts of the inhabitants of St. Kilda and The Red Cottage, home of Dr. Earle's former partner Dr. Campion, to find some sign of Dr. Earle, no trace is found.

The police are called in. At first, they suppose Dr. Earle has gone to his inamorata, the woman in grey. However, their investigation uncovers further discrepancies such as his not taking any money or personal belongings. The local police finally turn to Inspector French of Scotland Yard to help solve the mystery. The case soon takes a more complex turn; other people vanish mysteriously, including one of Dr. Earle's house guests. As the situation becomes more perplexing, French finds himself investigating no fewer than four murders.

== Bibliography ==
- Evans, Curtis. Masters of the "Humdrum" Mystery: Cecil John Charles Street, Freeman Wills Crofts, Alfred Walter Stewart and the British Detective Novel, 1920-1961. McFarland, 2014.
- Reilly, John M. Twentieth Century Crime & Mystery Writers. Springer, 2015.
