= The Case with Nine Solutions =

1928 novel

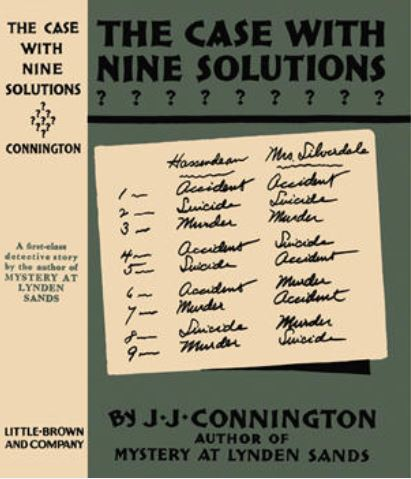
- American first edition cover
- Author: J.J. Connington
- Language: English
- Series: Sir Clinton Driffield
- Genre: Detective
- Publisher: Gollancz
- Publication date: 1928
- Publication place: United Kingdom
- Media type: Print
- Preceded by: Mystery at Lynden Sands
- Followed by: Nemesis at Raynham Parva

The Case with Nine Solutions is a 1928 detective novel by the British writer Alfred Walter Stewart, published under his pseudonym J.J. Connington. It is the forth in his series of novels featuring the Golden Age Detective Chief Constable Sir Clinton Driffield. It was published in London by Gollancz and the following year in Boston by Little, Brown and Company.

== Synopsis ==
Doctor Ringwood, acting as a locum in a small town while the GP is away, is called out one very foggy evening to attend to an urgent case. By accident goes to the house next door and finds a dying man who has clearly been shot. He goes next door to telephone for the police, and examines the patient he had been called out to tend to who is suffering from scarlet fever. He returns to the other house to stand guard until Sir Clinton Driffield and his colleague Inspector Flamborough arrive. During their time at the crime scene, a second murder takes place next door. Two further deaths occur before the case is solved, as Driffield works through the nine possible solutions of the killings.

== Bibliography ==
- Barzun, Jacques & Taylor, Wendell Hertig. A Catalogue of Crime. Harper & Row, 1989.
- Evans, Curtis. Masters of the "Humdrum" Mystery: Cecil John Charles Street, Freeman Wills Crofts, Alfred Walter Stewart and the British Detective Novel, 1920-1961. McFarland, 2014.
- Hubin, Allen J. Crime Fiction, 1749-1980: A Comprehensive Bibliography. Garland Publishing, 1984.
- Murphy, Bruce F. The Encyclopedia of Murder and Mystery. Springer, 1999.
- Reilly, John M. Twentieth Century Crime & Mystery Writers. Springer, 2015.
