= Antidote to Venom =

1938 novel

- First edition
- Author: Freeman Wills Crofts
- Language: English
- Series: Inspector French
- Genre: Mystery
- Publisher: Hodder and Stoughton
- Publication date: 1938
- Publication place: United Kingdom
- Media type: Print
- Preceded by: The End of Andrew Harrison
- Followed by: Fatal Venture

Antidote to Venom is a 1938 detective novel by the Irish-born novelist Freeman Wills Crofts. It is the eighteenth in his series of novels featuring Inspector French, a Scotland Yard detective known for his methodical technique. It was reissued in 2015 by the British Library Publishing as part of a group of crime novels from the Golden Age of Detective Fiction.

== Plot ==
The novel takes the form of an inverted detective story following the concerns of George Surridge, director of the Birmington Zoo whose financial troubles and unhappy marriage drive him towards contemplating a murder that could miraculously turn his fortunes around. An outlandish method of killing will relieve him of all his troubles. The arrival of the thorough Chief Inspector French from London, intrigued by the case, threatens this perfect crime. French believes he knows who committed the murder but has to work out how.

== Bibliography ==
- Evans, Curtis. Masters of the "Humdrum" Mystery: Cecil John Charles Street, Freeman Wills Crofts, Alfred Walter Stewart and the British Detective Novel, 1920-1961. McFarland, 2014.
- Herbert, Rosemary. Whodunit?: A Who's Who in Crime & Mystery Writing. Oxford University Press, 2003.
- Reilly, John M. Twentieth Century Crime & Mystery Writers. Springer, 2015.
