= Enemy Unseen (Crofts novel) =

1945 novel

- First edition cover
- Author: Freeman Wills Crofts
- Language: English
- Series: Chief Inspector French
- Genre: Mystery
- Publisher: Collins Crime Club
- Publication date: 1945
- Publication place: United Kingdom
- Media type: Print
- Preceded by: The Affair at Little Wokeham
- Followed by: Death of a Train

Enemy Unseen is a 1945 detective novel by Freeman Wills Crofts. It is the twenty-fifth in his series of novels featuring Chief Inspector French, a prominent figure of the Golden Age of Detective Fiction. A review by Anthony Boucher in the San Francisco Chronicle noted it was "For the patient only, but for them a rewarding treasure."

== Synopsis ==
During wartime in the town of St. Pols in Cornwall the local Home Guard are alarmed to discover that some hand grenades have been stolen from their stores. Soon afterwards a wealthy local man is blown up while walking on the beach. Any potential embarrassment to the War Office is lessened when the discreet and effective French is called in to handle the case.

== Bibliography ==
- Evans, Curtis. Masters of the "Humdrum" Mystery: Cecil John Charles Street, Freeman Wills Crofts, Alfred Walter Stewart and the British Detective Novel, 1920-1961. McFarland, 2014.
- Herbert, Rosemary. Whodunit?: A Who's Who in Crime & Mystery Writing. Oxford University Press, 2003.
- Reilly, John M. Twentieth Century Crime & Mystery Writers. Springer, 2015.
