= The End of Andrew Harrison =

1938 novel

- First edition
- Author: Freeman Wills Crofts
- Language: English
- Series: Inspector French
- Genre: Mystery
- Publisher: Hodder and Stoughton
- Publication date: 1938
- Publication place: United Kingdom
- Media type: Print
- Preceded by: Found Floating
- Followed by: Antidote to Venom

The End of Andrew Harrison is a 1938 detective novel by Freeman Wills Crofts. It is the seventeenth in his series of novels featuring Inspector French, a Scotland Yard detective of the Golden Age known for his methodical technique. The title character closely resembles Sigsbee Manderson, the murder victim of E.C. Bentley's celebrated 1913 novel Trent's Last Case.

== Synopsis ==
Few are prepared to shed a tear about the death of the ruthless financier Andrew Harrison aboard his houseboat at Henley. However the initial conclusion of suicide fails to convince French, who investigates and searches for the hidden link for what he believes is a case of murder.

== Bibliography ==
- Evans, Curtis. Masters of the "Humdrum" Mystery: Cecil John Charles Street, Freeman Wills Crofts, Alfred Walter Stewart and the British Detective Novel, 1920-1961. McFarland, 2014.
- Herbert, Rosemary. Whodunit?: A Who's Who in Crime & Mystery Writing. Oxford University Press, 2003.
- Reilly, John M. Twentieth Century Crime & Mystery Writers. Springer, 2015.
