= Sudden Death (novel) =

1932 novel

- First edition (UK)
- Author: Freeman Wills Crofts
- Language: English
- Series: Inspector French
- Genre: Mystery
- Publisher: Collins (UK); Harper (US)
- Publication date: 1932
- Publication place: United Kingdom
- Media type: Print
- Preceded by: Mystery in the Channel
- Followed by: Death on the Way

Sudden Death is a 1932 detective novel by the Irish writer Freeman Wills Crofts. It is the eighth in his series of novels featuring Inspector French, a prominent figure of the Golden Age of Detective Fiction.

== Synopsis ==
After a period out of work Anne Day is employed as housekeeper for the Grinsmead family in Kent. At first the well paid job is seemingly idyllic for the young woman, as there is comparatively little work and the setting of the house in picturesque. She gets on well with the other employees including Edith the governess. Mr. Grimstead, a solicitor is in London much of the day while his wife Sybil takes very little interest in Anne's work. Things dramatically change when Sybil confides to Anne that she believes her husband may be plotting to kill her, due to his desire to leave her for another woman. Although Sybil is apparently neurotic and paranoid, Anne has witnessed her husband's discreet dalliances with a married lady.

When Sybil is then found dead in a locked room having gassed herself, it is widely assumed she has committed suicide. Anne is torn between her fear of losing her comfortable position at the house and her conscience which tells her she is holding back what may be the truth. The arrival of Inspector French to study the matter further unsettles the whole household. He finds nothing at first to contradict the original police investigation's verdict of suicide and is about to abandon the inquiry when at the last minute he discovers a crucial piece of evidence that points to murder. Now deciding that Grimstead and his lover have joined forces to murder his wife, he sets out to gather enough proof to successfully bring them to trial. Believing he has cracked the case, French is about to arrest Grimstead when the solicitor is found shot dead in his study, again in a locked room: apparently a suicide, due to his remorse at the killing.

Arresting Grimstead's lover, who is sent to Maidstone Prison to await trial, the case seems sewn up. Then French and Anne Day both begin to suspect that Grimstead's death was not a suicide, and that the real culprit is someone else in the household.

== Bibliography ==
- Evans, Curtis. Masters of the "Humdrum" Mystery: Cecil John Charles Street, Freeman Wills Crofts, Alfred Walter Stewart and the British Detective Novel, 1920-1961. McFarland, 2014.
- Herbert, Rosemary. Whodunit?: A Who's Who in Crime & Mystery Writing. Oxford University Press, 2003.
- Reilly, John M. Twentieth Century Crime & Mystery Writers. Springer, 2015.
