= The Castleford Conundrum =

1932 novel

- Author: J.J. Connington
- Language: English
- Series: Sir Clinton Driffield
- Genre: Detective
- Publisher: Hodder and Stoughton
- Publication date: 1932
- Publication place: United Kingdom
- Media type: Print
- Preceded by: The Sweepstake Murders
- Followed by: The Ha-Ha Case

The Castleford Conundrum is a 1932 detective novel by the British author Alfred Walter Stewart, published under his pseudonym J.J. Connington. It is the eighth in his series of novels featuring the Golden Age Detective Chief Constable Sir Clinton Driffield, the Chief Constable of a rural English county. It makes passing reference to one of the earlier stories Mystery at Lynden Sands.

== Synopsis ==
The young Mrs Castleford holds the purse strings over her husband, half-sister, stepdaughter and former brothers-in-law due to the wealth she inherited from her late first husband. When she is found shot dead on a chalet on the edge of her country estate, Inspector Westerham is called in to investigate. He discovers the deceased had recently destroyed her first will and was in the process of replacing it with a second, favouring her brothers-in-law rather than her current husband for whom she had grown contemptuous.

Gradually the Inspectors suspicions point towards the lady's husband, and out-of-work artist. However an appeal by the accused's daughter to Sir Clinton Driffield's friend Wendover brings them both on to the case.

== Bibliography ==
- Barzun, Jacques & Taylor, Wendell Hertig. A Catalogue of Crime. Harper & Row, 1989.
- Evans, Curtis. Masters of the "Humdrum" Mystery: Cecil John Charles Street, Freeman Wills Crofts, Alfred Walter Stewart and the British Detective Novel, 1920-1961. McFarland, 2014.
- Hubin, Allen J. Crime Fiction, 1749-1980: A Comprehensive Bibliography. Garland Publishing, 1984.
- Murphy, Bruce F. The Encyclopedia of Murder and Mystery. Springer, 1999.
- Reilly, John M. Twentieth Century Crime & Mystery Writers. Springer, 2015.
