= Silence for the Murderer =

1949 novel

- First Edition (UK)
- Author: Freeman Wills Crofts
- Language: English
- Series: Inspector French
- Genre: Detective
- Publisher: Hodder and Stoughton (UK); Dodd Mead (US)
- Publication date: 1949
- Publication place: United Kingdom
- Media type: Print
- Preceded by: Death of a Train
- Followed by: French Strikes Oil

Silence for the Murderer is a 1949 detective novel by the writer Freeman Wills Crofts. It is the twenty-seventh entry in his series of novels featuring Inspector French, a Scotland Yard detective of the Golden Age known for his methodical technique. The book attempt to create more complex characterisation than was usual in the series.

== Synopsis ==
After leaving the army the raffish Frank Roscoe manages to secure employment in the household of a wealthy invalid. Seeing a chance for a scam he enlists the help of Dulcie Heath to assist him. Dulcie has been waiting for Frank to marry her when he returns from the army. However, her suspicions are raised when his employer dies and she suspects Frank of planning to marry his daughter for the inerhitance.

== Bibliography ==
- Evans, Curtis. Masters of the "Humdrum" Mystery: Cecil John Charles Street, Freeman Wills Crofts, Alfred Walter Stewart and the British Detective Novel, 1920-1961. McFarland, 2014.
- Herbert, Rosemary. Whodunit?: A Who's Who in Crime & Mystery Writing. Oxford University Press, 2003.
- Reilly, John M. Twentieth Century Crime & Mystery Writers. Springer, 2015.
