= Tom Tiddler's Island =

1933 novel

- Author: J.J. Connington
- Language: English
- Genre: Thriller
- Publisher: Hodder and Stoughton
- Publication date: 1933
- Publication place: United Kingdom
- Media type: Print

Tom Tiddler's Island is a 1933 mystery thriller novel written by the British author Alfred Walter Stewart and published under his pen name J.J. Connington. It is a stand-alone novel by the writer who was best known for his series of detective novels featuring Chief Constable Sir Clinton Driffield. Set on a Scottish island, the title is a reference to the children's game Tom Tiddler's Ground. It was published in London by Hodder and Stoughton and in the United States by Little, Brown under the alternative title Gold Brick Island.

== Synopsis ==
A young couple Clive and Jean Croft are spending part on their honeymoon on a remote Scottish island. Their enjoyment of the picturesque retreat is soon interrupted by a series of encounters with the other visitors to the island, gun-toting security for an egotistical professor apparently attempting the age-old practice of alchemy to create gold.

The arrival of an equally well-armed gang intent on stealing the gold puts the young couple in extreme danger. With the help of an old university acquaintance of Clive they attempt to fight back against the intruders.

== Bibliography ==
- Evans, Curtis. Masters of the "Humdrum" Mystery: Cecil John Charles Street, Freeman Wills Crofts, Alfred Walter Stewart and the British Detective Novel, 1920-1961. McFarland, 2014.
- Hubin, Allen J. Crime Fiction, 1749-1980: A Comprehensive Bibliography. Garland Publishing, 1984.
- Reilly, John M. Twentieth Century Crime & Mystery Writers. Springer, 2015.
