= Mystery at Lynden Sands =

1928 novel

- Author: J.J. Connington
- Language: English
- Series: Sir Clinton Driffield
- Genre: Detective
- Publisher: Gollancz
- Publication date: 1928
- Publication place: United Kingdom
- Media type: Print
- Preceded by: Tragedy at Ravensthorpe
- Followed by: The Case with Nine Solutions

Mystery at Lynden Sands is a 1928 detective novel by the British author Alfred Walter Stewart, published under his pseudonym J.J. Connington. It is the third in a series of novels featuring the Golden Age Detective Chief Constable Sir Clinton Driffield. It was published in London by Gollancz and Boston by Little, Brown and Company. It received a generally positive critical reception, with one reviewer going so far as to say it "may just fail of being the best detective story of the century" comparing it to The Cask and The Mysterious Affair at Styles. In A Catalogue of Crime by Jacques Barzun and Wendell Hertig Taylor describe it as "early but not first-class Connington".

== Synopsis ==
While holidaying at a new hotel at the coastal resort of Lynden Sands with his friend Westover, Chief Constable Sir Clinton Driffield is drawn into a murder case revolving around the large Fordingbridge inheritance including a country estate near to Lynden Sands. Two subsequent murders on the beach of Lynden Sands itself require all Sir Clinton's skills as a puzzle-solving detective to piece together the various clues and sandy footprints collected between the rising and falling tides.

== Bibliography ==
- Barzun, Jacques & Taylor, Wendell Hertig. A Catalogue of Crime. Harper & Row, 1989.
- Evans, Curtis. Masters of the "Humdrum" Mystery: Cecil John Charles Street, Freeman Wills Crofts, Alfred Walter Stewart and the British Detective Novel, 1920-1961. McFarland, 2014.
- Hubin, Allen J. Crime Fiction, 1749-1980: A Comprehensive Bibliography. Garland Publishing, 1984.
- Murphy, Bruce F. The Encyclopedia of Murder and Mystery. Springer, 1999.
- Reilly, John M. Twentieth Century Crime & Mystery Writers. Springer, 2015.
