= The Sweepstake Murders =

1931 novel

- Author: J.J. Connington
- Language: English
- Series: Sir Clinton Driffield
- Genre: Detective
- Publisher: Hodder and Stoughton
- Publication date: 1931
- Publication place: United Kingdom
- Media type: Print
- Preceded by: The Boathouse Riddle
- Followed by: The Castleford Conundrum

The Sweepstake Murders is a 1931 detective novel by the British author Alfred Walter Stewart, published under his pseudonym J.J. Connington. It is the seventh in his series of novels featuring the Golden Age Detective Chief Constable Sir Clinton Driffield. It uses a tontine murder theme, which recurs in detective and mystery stories.

== Synopsis ==
After a night of cards a group of men agree to invest in a pool on a coming sweepstake. The group are successful but before they can claim their winnings, one of their number is murdered. The prize money is due to be shared amongst the group, but further members are then killed. Sir Clinton Driffield is involved both professionally and privately, as his close friend Wendover is one of the members of the syndicate.

== Bibliography ==
- Barzun, Jacques & Taylor, Wendell Hertig. A Catalogue of Crime. Harper & Row, 1989.
- Evans, Curtis. Masters of the "Humdrum" Mystery: Cecil John Charles Street, Freeman Wills Crofts, Alfred Walter Stewart and the British Detective Novel, 1920-1961. McFarland, 2014.
- Hubin, Allen J. Crime Fiction, 1749-1980: A Comprehensive Bibliography. Garland Publishing, 1984.
- Murphy, Bruce F. The Encyclopedia of Murder and Mystery. Springer, 1999.
- Reilly, John M. Twentieth Century Crime & Mystery Writers. Springer, 2015.
