= A Minor Operation =

1937 novel

- American edition
- Author: J.J. Connington
- Language: English
- Series: Sir Clinton Driffield
- Genre: Detective
- Publisher: Hodder and Stoughton
- Publication date: 1937
- Publication place: United Kingdom
- Media type: Print
- Preceded by: In Whose Dim Shadow
- Followed by: Truth Comes Limping

A Minor Operation is a 1937 British detective novel by the British author Alfred Walter Stewart, published under his pseudonym J.J. Connington. It is the eleventh in a series of novels featuring the Golden Age Detective Chief Constable Sir Clinton Driffield and was published by Hodder and Stoughton in London and Little, Brown and Company in the United States. In a New York Times review Isaac Anderson noted Sir Clinton as being rare among Chief Constables in British mystery stories for his competence noting "If you have not previously met him in Mr. Connington’s other novels, this is a good time to make his acquaintance, for in this book you will see him at his best".

== Synopsis ==
The police are called to the house of Mrs. Deerhurst after she has vanished and a pool of blood of is found on the floor. Shortly afterwards the body of her estranged husband, a fraudster responsible for the financial ruination of her late father's firm, is found shortly after he was released from prison. The dead man had numerous enemies who might have gone so far to kill him, but the most obvious candidates are his wife and her cousin who also served prison time for the fraud. Yet the strange disappearance of Mrs. Deerhurst seems to hold the real clue of the case.

== Bibliography ==
- Evans, Curtis. Masters of the "Humdrum" Mystery: Cecil John Charles Street, Freeman Wills Crofts, Alfred Walter Stewart and the British Detective Novel, 1920–1961. McFarland, 2014.
- Hubin, Allen J. Crime Fiction, 1749–1980: A Comprehensive Bibliography. Garland Publishing, 1984.
- Murphy, Bruce F. The Encyclopedia of Murder and Mystery. Springer, 1999.
- Reilly, John M. Twentieth Century Crime & Mystery Writers. Springer, 2015.
