= The Sea Mystery =

1928 novel

- First edition
- Author: Freeman Wills Crofts
- Cover artist: H. Dixon
- Language: English
- Series: Inspector French
- Genre: Mystery
- Publisher: Collins
- Publication date: 1928
- Publication place: United Kingdom
- Media type: Print
- Preceded by: Inspector French and the Starvel Tragedy
- Followed by: The Box Office Murders

The Sea Mystery is a 1928 detective novel by Freeman Wills Crofts. It is the fourth in a series of novels featuring Inspector French of Scotland Yard. As with a number of his works Crofts creates a puzzling mystery which French is then able to solve using a Tide table and Bradshaw's Guide to the railways. The plot has some similarities with his debut novel The Cask (1920).

== Synopsis ==
French of Scotland Yard is called in when a fisherman discovers a crate containing a battered body on the cost of South Wales. His investigations eventually take him to Devon.

== Bibliography ==
- Carter, Ian. Railways and Culture in Britain: The Epitome of Modernity. Manchester University Press, 2001.
- Evans, Curtis. Masters of the "Humdrum" Mystery: Cecil John Charles Street, Freeman Wills Crofts, Alfred Walter Stewart and the British Detective Novel, 1920-1961. McFarland, 2014.
- Herbert, Rosemary. Whodunit?: A Who's Who in Crime & Mystery Writing. Oxford University Press, 2003.
- Reilly, John M. Twentieth Century Crime & Mystery Writers. Springer, 2015.
