= Tragedy at Ravensthorpe =

1927 novel

- Author: J.J. Connington
- Language: English
- Series: Sir Clinton Driffield
- Genre: Detective
- Publisher: Ernest Benn
- Publication date: 1927
- Publication place: United Kingdom
- Media type: Print
- Preceded by: Murder in the Maze
- Followed by: Mystery at Lynden Sands

Tragedy at Ravensthorpe is a 1927 detective novel by the British writer Alfred Walter Stewart, published under his pseudonym J.J. Connington. It is the second in a series of seventeen novels featuring the Golden Age Detective Chief Constable Sir Clinton Driffield following on from Murder in the Maze. The American edition was published in Boston by Little, Brown and Company.

== Synopsis ==
During a fancy dress party at the country estate of Ravensthorpe, an attempt is made to rob the museum room of the house containing the house's valuable collection. The main target seems to be some medallions about to be sold to an American millionaire. Sir Clinton, an old friend of the family and a guest at the party, takes over the investigation. When two deaths follow in the wake of the failed robbery, he works to establish what connection they may have with the valuable collection.

== Bibliography ==
- Barzun, Jacques & Taylor, Wendell Hertig. A Catalogue of Crime. Harper & Row, 1989.
- Evans, Curtis. Masters of the "Humdrum" Mystery: Cecil John Charles Street, Freeman Wills Crofts, Alfred Walter Stewart and the British Detective Novel, 1920-1961. McFarland, 2014.
- Hubin, Allen J. Crime Fiction, 1749-1980: A Comprehensive Bibliography. Garland Publishing, 1984.
- Murphy, Bruce F. The Encyclopedia of Murder and Mystery. Springer, 1999.
- Reilly, John M. Twentieth Century Crime & Mystery Writers. Springer, 2015.
