= The Ha-Ha Case =

1934 novel

- Author: J.J. Connington
- Language: English
- Series: Sir Clinton Driffield
- Genre: Detective
- Publisher: Hodder and Stoughton
- Publication date: 1934
- Publication place: United Kingdom
- Media type: Print
- Preceded by: The Castleford Conundrum
- Followed by: In Whose Dim Shadow

The Ha-Ha Case is a 1934 detective novel by the British author Alfred Walter Stewart, published under his pseudonym J.J. Connington. It is the ninth in his series of novels featuring the Golden Age Detective Chief Constable Sir Clinton Driffield, the Chief Constable of a rural English county. A traditional country house mystery, the title refers to a Ha-ha a sunken fence hidden to the naked eye common on country estates. Unlike the other novels in the series which are set when they are written, this is dated a decade before its publication in 1924. In a review in the Sunday Times Dorothy L. Sayers wrote "There is no need to say that Mr. Connington has given us a sound and interesting plot, very carefully and ingeniously worked out."

== Synopsis ==
A complex property inheritance comes to the fore when the youngest member of a family is killed in an apparently accidental shooting accident after he is discovered in a Ha-Ha with his head blown off. Inspector Hinton, the self-regarding police officer investigation the case, has doubts and pursues the matter turning up evidence about a plot to entrap the young heir by his tutor and his wife with a blackmail scheme and a forged document. However it falls to Sir Clinton Driffield, arriving late to the case but with the benefit of Hinton's gathering of evidence, to show that the accidental death was really murder and unmask the killer.

== Bibliography ==
- Barzun, Jacques & Taylor, Wendell Hertig. A Catalogue of Crime. Harper & Row, 1989.
- Evans, Curtis. Masters of the "Humdrum" Mystery: Cecil John Charles Street, Freeman Wills Crofts, Alfred Walter Stewart and the British Detective Novel, 1920-1961. McFarland, 2014.
- Hubin, Allen J. Crime Fiction, 1749-1980: A Comprehensive Bibliography. Garland Publishing, 1984.
- Murphy, Bruce F. The Encyclopedia of Murder and Mystery. Springer, 1999.
- Reilly, John M. Twentieth Century Crime & Mystery Writers. Springer, 2015.
