= Fear Comes to Chalfont =

1942 novel

- First US edition
- Author: Freeman Wills Crofts
- Language: English
- Series: Inspector French
- Genre: Mystery
- Publisher: Hodder and Stoughton (UK); Dodd Mead (US)
- Publication date: 1942
- Publication place: United Kingdom
- Media type: Print
- Preceded by: The Losing Game
- Followed by: The Affair at Little Wokeham

Fear Comes to Chalfont is a 1942 detective novel by the Irish writer Freeman Wills Crofts. It is the twenty-third in his series of novels featuring Inspector French, a prominent figure of the Golden Age of Detective Fiction. Like much of the author's work it combines a traditional mystery with a police procedural.

== Synopsis ==
The plot revolves around the killing of Richard Elton, the owner of the Surrey property at Chalfont, whose marriage of convenience with his wife Julia has reached breaking point due to her love for another man. French, with a new young sergeant under his wing, arrives to investigate the matter with his usual methodical precision.

== Bibliography ==
- Evans, Curtis. Masters of the "Humdrum" Mystery: Cecil John Charles Street, Freeman Wills Crofts, Alfred Walter Stewart and the British Detective Novel, 1920-1961. McFarland, 2014.
- Herbert, Rosemary. Whodunit?: A Who's Who in Crime & Mystery Writing. Oxford University Press, 2003.
- Reilly, John M. Twentieth Century Crime & Mystery Writers. Springer, 2015.
