= Truth Comes Limping =

1938 novel

- Author: J.J. Connington
- Language: English
- Series: Sir Clinton Driffield
- Genre: Detective
- Publisher: Hodder and Stoughton
- Publication date: 1938
- Publication place: United Kingdom
- Media type: Print
- Preceded by: A Minor Operation
- Followed by: For Murder Will Speak

Truth Comes Limping is a 1938 mystery detective novel by the British author Alfred Walter Stewart, published under his pseudonym J.J. Connington. It is the twelfth in a series of seventeen novels featuring the Golden Age Detective Sir Clinton Driffield, the Chief Constable of a rural English county. It was published by Hodder and Stoughton in London and Little, Brown and Company in the United States.

== Synopsis ==
In the village of Abbots Norton not far from the county town of Ambledown a corpse is discovered on a lovers lane one dark night by a courting couple. A poacher is discovered behaving suspiciously around the area, but clues seem to suggest a connection with the wealthy landowners who control the country estate next to where the murder took place. The dead man proves to be a hack writer who after years of struggle has seemed to hit on a financial bonanza by writing a biography of a recently deceased novelist and scoundrel, which he appears to have used as the basis for blackmailing those implicated in the famous man's diaries.

== Bibliography ==
- Carter, Ian. Railways and Culture in Britain: The Epitome of Modernity. Manchester University Press, 2001.
- Evans, Curtis. Masters of the "Humdrum" Mystery: Cecil John Charles Street, Freeman Wills Crofts, Alfred Walter Stewart and the British Detective Novel, 1920–1961. McFarland, 2014.
- Hubin, Allen J. Crime Fiction, 1749–1980: A Comprehensive Bibliography. Garland Publishing, 1984.
- Murphy, Bruce F. The Encyclopedia of Murder and Mystery. Springer, 1999.
- Reilly, John M. Twentieth Century Crime & Mystery Writers. Springer, 2015.
