= The Boathouse Riddle =

1931 novel

- Author: J.J. Connington
- Language: English
- Series: Sir Clinton Driffield
- Genre: Detective
- Publisher: Gollancz
- Publication date: 1931
- Publication place: United Kingdom
- Media type: Print
- Preceded by: Nemesis at Raynham Parva
- Followed by: The Sweepstake Murders

The Boathouse Riddle is a 1931 detective novel by the British author Alfred Walter Stewart, published under his pseudonym J.J. Connington. It is the sixth in his series of seventeen novels featuring the Golden Age Detective Chief Constable Sir Clinton Driffield. The title is also written as The Boat-House Riddle.

Two years earlier with Nemesis at Raynham Parva had effectively seemed to have retired his lead character, in a style similar to Arthur Conan Doyle attempt to conclude the Sherlock Holmes series in The Final Problem. An attempt to replace Sir Clinton with a new lead character, Superintendent Ross in two novels had been less successful and he returned as Chief Constable. Significantly for the formula of the series, Clinton's friend Wendover who had only appeared in two of the first five books featured in every novel of the series afterwards. The Boathouse Riddle received a positive review in A Catalogue of Crime by Jacques Barzun and Wendell Hertig Taylor.

== Synopsis ==
Overworked and needing a break, Sir Clinton accepts an invitation to stay at the country house of his friend Wendover. Wendover has a new boathouse and the two men are looking forwards to a few weeks quiet fishing. But the murder of a gamekeeper on the adjacent estate provides a series of puzzles that intrigue Sir Clinton who directs the local police force in their investigation.

== Bibliography ==
- Barzun, Jacques & Taylor, Wendell Hertig. A Catalogue of Crime. Harper & Row, 1989.
- Evans, Curtis. Masters of the "Humdrum" Mystery: Cecil John Charles Street, Freeman Wills Crofts, Alfred Walter Stewart and the British Detective Novel, 1920-1961. McFarland, 2014.
- Hubin, Allen J. Crime Fiction, 1749-1980: A Comprehensive Bibliography. Garland Publishing, 1984.
- Murphy, Bruce F. The Encyclopedia of Murder and Mystery. Springer, 1999.
- Reilly, John M. Twentieth Century Crime & Mystery Writers. Springer, 2015.
