= Mystery on Southampton Water =

1934 novel

- First edition
- Author: Freeman Wills Crofts
- Language: English
- Series: Inspector French
- Genre: Detective
- Publisher: Hodder and Stoughton
- Publication date: 1934
- Publication place: United Kingdom
- Media type: Print
- Preceded by: The 12.30 from Croydon
- Followed by: Crime at Guildford

Mystery on Southampton Water is a 1934 detective novel by the Irish writer Freeman Wills Crofts. It was the twelfth in a series of novels featuring Inspector French and takes the form of an inverted detective story, the second Crofts wrote that year after The 12.30 from Croydon. It was published in America by Dodd Mead under the alternative title Crime on the Solent.

== Synopsis ==
A cement-producing company based near Hamble discover that a rival across the Solent near Cowes on the Isle of Wight has begun producing cement with a new formula that is undercutting them and threatening their financial recovery from the Great Depression. Two members cross over to steal the formula one night but accidentally kill a night watchman who disturbs them. They disguise the killing as a car accident, and have already established alibis to cover the robbery and so hope to hear no more about it. With the stolen formula their company begins preparations to start producing the new product.

Things begin to go wrong for them when Chief Inspector French is assigned to the case, swiftly proving it couldn't have been an accident. On top of this the company are approached by the directors of their rival who, having unearthed evidence tying them to the killing, essentially blackmail them into agreeing to a business deal on very generous terms. When shortly afterwards the launch carrying the blackmailers back across Southampton Water explodes, drowning two of them, French follows up the case with renewed energy.

== Bibliography ==
- Evans, Curtis. Masters of the "Humdrum" Mystery: Cecil John Charles Street, Freeman Wills Crofts, Alfred Walter Stewart and the British Detective Novel, 1920-1961. McFarland, 2014.
- Reilly, John M. Twentieth Century Crime & Mystery Writers. Springer, 2015.
