= Inspector French and the Starvel Tragedy =

1927 novel

- First edition (UK)
- Author: Freeman Wills Crofts
- Language: English
- Series: Inspector French
- Genre: Crime fiction
- Published: 1927 Collins
- Publication place: United Kingdom
- Media type: Print (Hardback)
- Pages: 292p.
- OCLC: 11229526
- Preceded by: The Cheyne Mystery
- Followed by: The Sea Mystery

Inspector French and the Starvel Tragedy is a crime novel by Freeman Wills Crofts, featuring Inspector Joseph French of Scotland Yard.

== Plot outline ==
Three people are burnt to death in Yorkshire. But what initially appears to be an accident turns out to be a case of multiple murder, arson, and body snatching.

== Publication history ==
- 2001 – UK: House of Stratus
- 1987 – UK, London: Hogarth Press
- 1945 – UK: Penguin Books, 1st pb edition (#514)
- 1927 – US, New York: Harper, 1st US edition as The Starvel Hollow Tragedy
- 1927 – UK, London: William Collins Sons & Co. Ltd.,
