= Man Overboard! =

1936 novel

- First edition (UK)
- Author: Freeman Wills Crofts
- Language: English
- Series: Inspector French
- Genre: Detective
- Publisher: Collins Crime Club (UK); Dodd, Mead (US)
- Publication date: 1936
- Publication place: United Kingdom
- Media type: Print
- Preceded by: The Loss of the Jane Vosper
- Followed by: Found Floating

Man Overboard! (also known as Cold-Blooded Murder) is a detective novel by Freeman Wills Crofts, first published in 1936. It is the fifteenth novel in the Inspector French series. The book is set largely in Northern Ireland, and re-uses two of the characters from the earlier novel Sir John Magill's Last Journey (1930) which was set in the same country. As a MacGuffin, the novel centres on a supposedly newly discovered (though possibly fraudulent) reversible chemical process that converts petrol into an inert form which is much safer for transport and storage. The potential commercial value of this discovery leads to intrigue, theft and murder, with everything finally solved by Inspector French after his usual dogged legwork and some flashes of inspiration.
