= The 12.30 from Croydon =

1934 novel by Freeman Wills Crofts

- First edition
- Author: Freeman Wills Crofts
- Language: English
- Series: Inspector French
- Genre: Mystery
- Publisher: Hodder & Stoughton
- Publication date: 1934
- Publication place: United Kingdom
- Media type: Print (Hardback & Paperback)
- Preceded by: The Hog's Back Mystery
- Followed by: Mystery on Southampton Water

The 12.30 from Croydon (U.S. title: Wilful and Premeditated) is a detective novel by Freeman Wills Crofts first published in 1934. It is about a murder which is committed during a flight over the English Channel. The identity of the killer is revealed quite early in the book (making it an early example of the inverted detective story or "howcatchem"), and the reader can watch the preparations for the crime and how the murderer tries to cover up his tracks. The final chapters of the novel are set in a courtroom and during a private function at a hotel, where a résumé of the whole case is given in front of a small group of police detectives, solicitors, and barristers.

== Synopsis ==
Set in Yorkshire and London in 1933, the novel centres on 35-year-old Charles Swinburn, owner of a factory in Cold Pickerby, Yorkshire, in which electric motors are produced. Swinburn has inherited the works from his father and uncle. While his father has been dead for many years, his uncle, Andrew Crowther, leads a retired life in the same town. At 65, his health has recently started to deteriorate: in particular, he suffers from indigestion.

The business is hit by the Great Depression, but when Swinburn asks his uncle for a loan to avoid bankruptcy, the old man, obviously no longer able to understand trends in the world economy, is unwilling to grant him a substantial sum. Swinburn knows that he and his cousin Elsie will each inherit half of Crowther's fortune, so he does not see why he cannot have some of the money a bit earlier – "an advance on his legacy". At this point it occurs to him that it might be feasible to kill his uncle without being found out.

He is brought to a decision by his unrequited love for a young woman named Una Mellor, who tells him that she would not be prepared under any circumstances to marry a poor man.

Swinburn resolves to poison his uncle with potassium cyanide. He buys the poison, taking various precautions. He then makes a pill that looks like one of Crowther's anti-indigestion tablets. He buys a bottle of those pills, hides the poisoned pill within it, and, when visiting his uncle for dinner, spills a glass of wine which gives him the opportunity to switch the two bottles.

The following morning, to give himself an alibi, he books a three-week cruise of the Mediterranean. When news of his uncle's death reaches him, he is in Naples, Italy. To his surprise, he learns that his uncle took the pill not at home but on his first (and last) flight, the 12.30 from Croydon Airport. The family had been alarmed by a report stating that Elsie had had an accident in France, and Crowther had insisted on coming with Elsie's father and their daughter. On arrival in France he had been found dead.

An inquest is held, but Swinburn feels quite safe when no one seems to implicate him in the case. However, some time later he is approached by Weatherup, Crowther's butler, who claims that he saw him exchange the bottles, and who starts blackmailing him. Again, Swinburn sees no other solution than to "take that desperate remedy" and kill the butler. This time he cannot be as subtle as when planning his uncle's death. He brutally slays Weatherup with a piece of lead pipe and dumps his body in a nearby lake.

Soon afterwards he is arrested, tried, and hanged.

Avon (unnumbered #9), first paperback edition, 1941 and the first edition under the U.S. title

== Style ==
The novel is written in such a manner as to give the reader an insight into the workings of a criminal mind. In particular, Swinburn rationalises his conduct on utilitarian grounds:

Then he told himself that all this morality business was only an old wives' tale. He, Charles, wasn't tied up by these out-of-date considerations! What was politic was right. What was the greatest good of the greatest number? Why, that Andrew should die. What about all the men that were going to be thrown out of employment? What about the clerks? What about poor old Gairns? What about Gairns's invalid wife? Andrew Crowther's useless life could count for nothing against such a weight of human suffering.

— [Chapter VII]

Detective-Inspector Joseph French, who appears in several of Crofts' novels, keeps in the background during the action of The 12.30 from Croydon. He does solve the case, and explains how he did it in the final chapters, but the emphasis is on the thoughts and deeds of the criminal.

== Reception ==
Christopher Adams, of the Birmingham Gazette, thought that it was a "gripping book", and would be remembered due to its "distinctive method of construction". The World's News agreed that it was a "very clever plot". Several reviews complimented the novelty of the reverse detective format. On the other hand, a review in The Courier-Mail, thought the story more unusual than convincing.

== Similar works ==
- Agatha Christie's Death in the Clouds (1935) is a whodunnit in which a murder is committed on a flight from Le Bourget to Croydon, with Hercule Poirot on board.
- Francis Iles's Malice Aforethought (1931) is an earlier experiment in psychological suspense fiction.
- Patricia Highsmith's This Sweet Sickness (1961) follows a young murderer on his way to self-destruction who is similarly driven by the prospect of winning the love of a beautiful woman.
- Simon Brett's A Shock to the System (1984) is also about a killer who is deluded into thinking that he can get away with murder.
