= Sir John Magill's Last Journey =

1930 novel

Sir John Magill’s Last Journey
- American first edition cover
- Author: Freeman Wills Crofts
- Language: English
- Series: Inspector French
- Genre: Detective
- Publisher: Collins Crime Club (UK); Harpers (US)
- Publication date: 1930
- Publication place: United Kingdom
- Media type: Print
- Preceded by: The Box Office Murders
- Followed by: Mystery in the Channel

Sir John Magill's Last Journey is a 1930 detective novel by the Irish writer Freeman Wills Crofts. It is the sixth in his series of novels featuring Inspector French, a prominent figure of the Golden Age of Detective Fiction. Much of the novel takes place in Northern Ireland, particularly around Belfast, where Crofts had spent a great deal of his younger years before moving to England. As with many of his puzzle mysteries its solution revolves around railway timetables as well as the possible distance a boat could cover in a certain time.

Crofts' admiration for the Royal Ulster Constabulary, and implicitly the Northern Irish state, is clear throughout the novel although it features little direct reference to politics. In spite of this it was published in the Irish Free State and translated into Gaelic.

== Synopsis ==
When Sir John Magill, an Irish linen millionaire, disappears on a rare visit to Belfast, the assistance of Scotland Yard is sought. Some years earlier, Magill turned over his business interests to his son Major Malcolm Magill and retired to live in Knightsbridge. Inspector French is assigned to the case and travels to Ireland where he collaborates with the local police force to follow up on various clues, concluding in the discovery of Sir John's body in a shallow grave on the edge of Major Magill's country estate outside Belfast. The evidence appears to point to Major Magill's having committed the murder in order to come into a large inheritance from his father, which he needed due to the struggling financial situation of the linen industry.

Returning to England, French's investigations centre on the last journey taken by Sir John Magill on the boat train from Euston to Stanraer and a cruise taken by Sir John's nephew, Victor, on a launch along the coast of Western Scotland. It transpires that Magill had been lured to the North of Ireland by the alleged discovery of a radical synthetic material mixing silk and linen that he hopes will revive the Irish linen industry and make his family's fortune. Despite much apparent evidence to the contrary, French deduces that Sir John never set foot on Irish soil alive. The investigation reaches its climax at Cavehill above Belfast during the night.

== Bibliography ==
- Reilly, John M (25 December 2015). Twentieth Century Crime & Mystery Writers (illustrated ed.). Springer. p. 396. ISBN 9781349813667.
- Foster, John Wilson (2008). Irish Novels, 1890-1940: New Bearings in Culture and Fiction. Oxford University Press. ISBN 9780191716454.
- Evans, Curtis. Masters of the "Humdrum" Mystery: Cecil John Charles Street, Freeman Wills Crofts, Alfred Walter Stewart and the British Detective Novel, 1920-1961. McFarland, 2014.
- Herbert, Rosemary. Whodunit?: A Who's Who in Crime & Mystery Writing. Oxford University Press, 2003.
