= Alfred Walter Stewart =

British chemist and novelist (1880–1947)

- Born: September 5, 1880; Glasgow, Scotland
- Died: July 1, 1947 (aged 66)
- Occupations: Author, chemist
- Writing career
- Pen name: JJ Connington
- Years active: 1923-1947
- Genres: Detective fiction, science fiction
- Notable work: Sir Clinton Driffield series

Alfred Walter Stewart (5 September 1880 – 1 July 1947) was a British chemist and part-time novelist who wrote twenty seven detective novels and a pioneering science fiction work between 1923 and 1947 under the pseudonym of JJ Connington. His most prominent protagonist was Chief Constable Sir Clinton Driffield, who first appeared in his novel Murder in the Maze (1927).

== Biography ==
Born in Glasgow in 1880, Stewart was the youngest of three sons of the Reverend Dr. Stewart, Clerk to the University Senate and Professor of Divinity. After attending Glasgow High School he entered Glasgow University, graduating 1902, taking chemistry as his major. His outstanding performance earned him the Mackay-Smith scholarship.

After spending a year in Marburg engaging in research under Theodor Zincke, he was elected to an 1851 Exhibition Scholarship and then in 1903 entered University College, London. Here he began independent research. His work, which formed part of his thesis, gained him a DSc degree from Glasgow University in 1907 and he was soon elected to a Carnegie Research Fellowship (1905–1908).

He decided to pursue an academic career and in 1908 wrote Recent Advances in Organic Chemistry which proved to be a popular textbook whose success encouraged him to write a companion volume on Inorganic and Physical Chemistry in 1909.

In 1909 Stewart was appointed to a lectureship in organic chemistry at Queen's University, Belfast and in 1914 was appointed Lecturer in Physical Chemistry and Radioactivity at the University of Glasgow. During World War I he worked for the Admiralty. In 1918 he drew attention to the result of a beta particle change in a radioactive element and suggested the term isobar as complementary to isotope.

He retired from his academic work in 1944 following recurrent heart problems.

Stewart is now chiefly remembered for his first novel, Nordenholt's Million (1923), an early ecocatastrophe disaster novel in which denitrifying bacteria inimical to plant growth run amok and destroy world agriculture. The eponymous plutocrat Nordenholt constructs a refuge for the chosen few in Scotland, fortifying the Clyde valley. The novel is similar in spirit to such disaster stories as Philip Wylie and Edwin Balmer's When Worlds Collide (1933) and anticipates the theme of John Christopher's The Death of Grass (1956).

Dorothy L. Sayers paid tribute to Stewart's The Two Tickets Puzzle in her The Five Red Herrings. She gave him full credit and built on one of his ideas for part of the solution of her mystery.

John Dickson Carr was also an admirer of Stewart's and Carr's first novel in 1930 mentioned two of Stewart's earlier novels with admiration.

== Bibliography ==
=== Sir Clinton Driffield novels ===
- Murder in the Maze, 1927
- Tragedy at Ravensthorpe, 1927
- Mystery at Lynden Sands, 1928
- The Case with Nine Solutions, 1928
- Nemesis at Raynham Parva, 1929 (a.k.a. Grim Vengeance)
- The Boathouse Riddle, 1931
- The Sweepstake Murders, 1931
- The Castleford Conundrum, 1932
- The Ha-Ha Case, 1934 (a.k.a. The Brandon Case)
- In Whose Dim Shadow, 1935 (a.k.a. The Tau Cross Mystery)
- A Minor Operation, 1937
- Truth Comes Limping, 1938
- For Murder Will Speak, 1938 (a.k.a. Murder Will Speak)
- The Twenty-One Clues, 1941
- No Past Is Dead, 1942
- Jack-in-the-Box, 1944
- Common Sense Is All You Need, 1947

=== Superintendent Ross novels ===
- The Eye in the Museum, 1929
- The Two Tickets Puzzle, 1930 (a.k.a. The Two Ticket Puzzle)

=== Max Brand novels ===
- The Counsellor, 1939
- The Four Defences, 1940

=== Other novels ===
- Nordenholt's Million, London, Bombay, Sydney: Constable & Co. Ltd., 1923; repr. New York: Dover Publications, 2016
- Almighty Gold, 1924
- Death at Swaythling Court, 1926
- The Dangerfield Talisman, 1926
- Tom Tiddler's Island, 1933 (a.k.a. Gold Brick Island)

=== Short stories ===
- "After Death the Doctor", (London) Daily News, 25 to 29 January 1934
- "Before Insulin", 1937

=== Nonfiction ===
- Stereochemistry, 1907
- Recent Advances in Organic Chemistry, 1908
- Inorganic and Physical Chemistry, 1909
- Some Physico-chemical Themes, 1922
- Alias J. J. Connington, 1947 (repr. 2015)
