= Common Sense Is All You Need =

1947 novel

- Author: J.J. Connington
- Language: English
- Series: Sir Clinton Driffield
- Genre: Detective
- Publisher: Hodder and Stoughton
- Publication date: 1947
- Publication place: United Kingdom
- Media type: Print
- Preceded by: Jack-in-the-Box

Common Sense Is All You Need is a 1947 detective novel by the British author Alfred Walter Stewart, published under his pseudonym J.J. Connington. It was his last novel, published by Hodder and Stoughton the year of his death, and featured his regular character Sir Clinton Driffield. It was the seventeenth in a series of novels featuring Driffield, a Chief Constable of a rural English county, published during the Golden Age of Detective Fiction. Although published during the postwar era. it is set during the Second World War with German bombing raids taking place.

== Synopsis ==
During a Paper Salvage Drive to help the British war effort, a librarian is found hanging in the small building where he garaged his car which is laid up due to the shortage of petrol. What at first seems a clear case of suicide is disproved by the criminologist called in to deal with the forensic evidence, who informs the officious Inspector that "common sense is all you need" to work out it is in fact murder.

The dead man was deep in debt with a younger wife with many male admirers, and had been involved with the efforts to sort out valuable editions of books and documents that may have been collected for salvage. Is it possible that something the dead man laid his hands on has led to his death? Sir Clinton Driffield steps in to direct the case to a satisfactory conclusion.

== Bibliography ==
- Hubin, Allen J. Crime Fiction, 1749-1980: A Comprehensive Bibliography. Garland Publishing, 1984.
- Kramer, John E. College Mystery Novels: An Annotated Bibliography, Including a Guide to Professorial Series-character Sleuths. Garland Publishing, 1983.
- Murphy, Bruce F. The Encyclopedia of Murder and Mystery. Springer, 1999.
- Reilly, John M. Twentieth Century Crime & Mystery Writers. Springer, 2015.
