= Death of a Train =

Novel by Freeman Wills Crofts

- First Edition cover
- Author: Freeman Wills Crofts
- Language: English
- Series: Inspector French
- Genre: Crime fiction
- Publisher: Hodder & Stoughton
- Publication date: 1946
- Publication place: United Kingdom
- Media type: Print (Hardback & Paperback)
- Preceded by: Enemy Unseen
- Followed by: Silence for the Murderer

Death of a Train is a crime novel by Freeman Wills Crofts, published in 1946.

== Synopsis ==
Set during World War II, a network of German secret agents plans to derail a train carrying vital war supplies. Due to a delay another train is derailed instead, the intended one then being diverted safely round the blockage. Inspector French tracks down the conspirators, nearly losing his life in a heroic final action to prevent their escape.
