= The Four Defences =

1940 novel

- Author: J.J. Connington
- Language: English
- Series: Mark Brand
- Genre: Detective
- Publisher: Hodder and Stoughton
- Publication date: 1940
- Publication place: United Kingdom
- Media type: Print
- Preceded by: The Counsellor

The Four Defences is a 1940 detective novel by the British author J.J. Connington, the pen name of the chemist Alfred Walter Stewart. It was published in London by Hodder and Stoughton and in the United States by Little, Brown and Company. It is a sequel to the 1939 novel The Counsellor featuring radio personality Mark Brand in a brief hiatus for Connington's best-known series detective Chief Constable Sir Clinton Driffield. It was inspired by the real-life Alfred Rouse case of 1930. Written and set just before the outbreak of the Second World War, it was released in wartime.

== Synopsis ==
After the burning wreck of a car is discovered with an unidentifiable corpse in it Brand's assistance is called for by the coroner to help him demonstrate to the dubious police that it is a case of suicide. Instead, he quickly establishes that it is a clear case of murder.

With his usual enthusiasm, Brand takes up the dominant role in the investigation alongside Inspector Hartwell of the local force. He manages to identify the body provisionally, but with two other potential candidates for the course he is far from sure. He eventually both unmasks the real identity of the corpse in the car and the ingenious plan by which the murderer planned to have "four defences" should he ever be tried for the killing in court.

== Critical reception ==
In A Catalogue of Crime it is described as "an interesting variation of the Rouse motorcar murder".

== Bibliography ==
- Evans, Curtis. Masters of the "Humdrum" Mystery: Cecil John Charles Street, Freeman Wills Crofts, Alfred Walter Stewart and the British Detective Novel, 1920–1961. McFarland, 2014.
- Hubin, Allen J. Crime Fiction, 1749–1980: A Comprehensive Bibliography. Garland Publishing, 1984.
- Murphy, Bruce F. The Encyclopedia of Murder and Mystery. Springer, 1999.
- Reilly, John M. Twentieth Century Crime & Mystery Writers. Springer, 2015.
