= James Tarrant, Adventurer =

1941 novel

- Author: Freeman Wills Crofts
- Language: English
- Series: Inspector French
- Genre: Detective
- Publisher: Hodder and Stoughton (UK); Dodd Mead (US)
- Publication date: 1941
- Publication place: United Kingdom
- Media type: Print
- Preceded by: Golden Ashes
- Followed by: The Losing Game

James Tarrant, Adventurer is a 1941 detective novel by the Irish-born writer Freeman Wills Crofts. It is the twenty-first in his series of novels featuring Chief Inspector French of Scotland Yard, written during the Golden Age of Detective Fiction. Published in Britain by Hodder and Stoughton, it was released in America by Dodd Mead under the alternative title Circumstantial Evidence.

It was one of a number of novels by Crofts during the period which portray overly acquisitive businessman in a bad light and constitutes an attack on patent medicines.

== Synopsis ==
James Tarrant, a ruthlessly ambitious young man working as an assistant in a chemist shop, hatches a radical plan. He will set up in private business and produce indigestion remedies to be sold over the counter. While harmless they do relatively little to justify the large price that is charged, containing magnesium and a few other ingredients. This is a similar scheme to that of a rival group Braxamin, who are enjoying success due to a large advertising campaign. Tarrant piggy-backs on this by bribing a number of pharmacists to recommend his own product whenever a customer asks for the popular brand Braxamin.

To raise funds for his venture Tarrant seduces Merle, an attractive nurse, and promises marriage once their business is a success. Despite her misgivings she goes along with the plan out of love for him, puts the money up, and manages the works while he makes sales around the country. The scheme is a huge success until the managing director of Braxamin sees sales dropping off and does some research. Discovering the plan he persuades the board to buy out the upstart company and put Tarrant on their own board.

Tarrant tells Merle he has only received a small amount of money, but plans to start up again with a similar scheme. Meanwhile, with his newfound wealth he buys an expensive property in a rural village and starts courting a heiress whose vast wealth will let him live a life of luxury and leisure. Shortly after announcing his engagement, he is discovered dead from drowning on a fishing trip, having ingested a large amount of poison. Suspicion of murder falls on the unfortunate Merle, who has only learned of his engagement through a newspaper.

Chief Inspector French is brought onto the case, and all clues point to Merle being the murderer. Reluctantly he reports to the local Chief Constable and she is arrested and charged. At the assizes she is convicted of murder and sentenced to the death penalty. Then at the last moment French receives information that might change the complexion of the whole case.

== Bibliography ==
- Evans, Curtis. Masters of the "Humdrum" Mystery: Cecil John Charles Street, Freeman Wills Crofts, Alfred Walter Stewart and the British Detective Novel, 1920–1961. McFarland, 2014.
- Herbert, Rosemary. Whodunit?: A Who's Who in Crime & Mystery Writing. Oxford University Press, 2003.
- Reilly, John M. Twentieth Century Crime & Mystery Writers. Springer, 2015.
