= The Counsellor (novel) =

1939 novel

- Author: J.J. Connington
- Language: English
- Series: Mark Brand
- Genre: Detective
- Publisher: Hodder and Stoughton
- Publication date: 1939
- Publication place: United Kingdom
- Media type: Print
- Followed by: The Four Defences

The Counsellor is a 1939 detective novel by the British author Alfred Walter Stewart, published under his pseudonym J.J. Connington. It was published in London by Hodder and Stoughton and in the United States by Little, Brown and Company. It was the first of two novels in which Connington replaced his usual detective Sir Clinton Driffield with radio personality Max Brand. It was followed the next year by The Four Defences before Connington returned to writing Driffield novels.

== Synopsis ==
The wealthy Max Brand tries to put his inherited money to good use by running a radio show on the wireless in which he attempts to give advice or solve problems for the public. He is contacted by one of his listeners concerning the unexplained disappearance of a young woman, the niece of the owner of a company specialising in reproductions of paintings by Old Masters. Deciding to turn detective Brand, with the aid of his secretary takes up the case and is soon able to follow the trail of the young woman along the Great North Road and beyond to Gretna Green and then on to Stranraer where she has likely sailed abroad in the company of an American man.

However Brand becomes convinced that this trail was simply a red herring, made by an impersonator, and real young woman is being held somewhere close to where she was kidnapped. When her uncle is then murdered at his country house, Brand begins to take a greater interest in the company he owned and who could possibly stand to benefit from taking control of what seems like an unprofitable business.

== Bibliography ==
- Evans, Curtis. Masters of the "Humdrum" Mystery: Cecil John Charles Street, Freeman Wills Crofts, Alfred Walter Stewart and the British Detective Novel, 1920-1961. McFarland, 2014.
- Hubin, Allen J. Crime Fiction, 1749-1980: A Comprehensive Bibliography. Garland Publishing, 1984.
- Murphy, Bruce F. The Encyclopedia of Murder and Mystery. Springer, 1999.
- Reilly, John M. Twentieth Century Crime & Mystery Writers. Springer, 2015.
