= The Cask =

1920 novel

- First edition
- Author: Freeman Wills Crofts
- Language: English
- Genre: Detective
- Publisher: Collins
- Publication date: 1920
- Publication place: United Kingdom
- Media type: Print
- Website: https://standardebooks.org/ebooks/freeman-wills-crofts/the-cask

The Cask is a 1920 detective novel by the Irish-born writer Freeman Wills Crofts. His debut novel, it is considered his masterpiece. Long after the author's reputation had declined, this book was still hailed by critics, as a cornerstone of the genre. Crofts had been working as a railway engineer before writing the novel, but its success launched him as one of the leading writers of the Golden Age of Detective Fiction. He later went on to create the character of Inspector French of Scotland Yard who appeared in a long-running series of novels.

== Bibliography ==
- Evans, Curtis. Masters of the "Humdrum" Mystery: Cecil John Charles Street, Freeman Wills Crofts, Alfred Walter Stewart and the British Detective Novel, 1920-1961. McFarland, 2014.
- Herbert, Rosemary. Whodunit?: A Who's Who in Crime & Mystery Writing. Oxford University Press, 2003.
- Reilly, John M. Twentieth Century Crime & Mystery Writers. Springer, 2015.
