= Murder in the Maze =

1927 novel

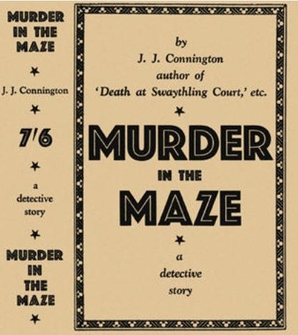
- Author: J.J. Connington
- Language: English
- Series: Sir Clinton Driffield
- Genre: Detective
- Publisher: Ernest Benn
- Publication date: 1927
- Publication place: United Kingdom
- Media type: Print
- Followed by: Tragedy at Ravensthorpe

Murder in the Maze is a 1927 detective novel by the British author Alfred Walter Stewart, published under his pseudonym J.J. Connington. It was the first of seventeen novels featuring his best-known character the Golden Age Detective Sir Clinton Driffield, Chief Constable of an English county. It takes the form of a classic country house mystery. First published in Britain by Ernest Benn, it was released in the United States by Little, Brown and Company.

== Bibliography ==
- Evans, Curtis. Masters of the "Humdrum" Mystery: Cecil John Charles Street, Freeman Wills Crofts, Alfred Walter Stewart and the British Detective Novel, 1920-1961. McFarland, 2014.
- Hubin, Allen J. Crime Fiction, 1749-1980: A Comprehensive Bibliography. Garland Publishing, 1984.
- Murphy, Bruce F. The Encyclopedia of Murder and Mystery. Springer, 1999.
- Reilly, John M. Twentieth Century Crime & Mystery Writers. Springer, 2015.
- James, Russell. Great British Fictional Detectives. Remember When, 2009.
