= Inspector French's Greatest Case =

1924 novel

- First edition
- Author: Freeman Wills Crofts
- Language: English
- Series: Inspector French
- Genre: Detective
- Publisher: Collins
- Publication date: 1924
- Publication place: United Kingdom
- Media type: Print
- Followed by: The Cheyne Mystery
- Website: https://standardebooks.org/ebooks/freeman-wills-crofts/inspector-frenchs-greatest-case

Inspector French's Greatest Case is a 1924 mystery detective novel by Freeman Wills Crofts. It is the first in his series of novels featuring Inspector Joseph French, a Scotland Yard detective of the Golden Age known for his methodical technique. Like much of the following series the plot mixes the traditional form of the puzzle mystery with that of a police procedural. French has to carefully study railway and shipping timetables and crack a cipher in order to solve his case.

== Synopsis ==
A robbery of the safe of a diamond merchant in London's Hatton Garden leaves one of the firm's veteran employees dead. Summoned to handle the case French pursues disparate clues over a number of weeks with some of the trails turning out to be dead ends. His travels take him from the capital to Southampton and a variety of destinations on the Continent including Amsterdam, the Swiss Alps, Barcelona and Le Havre. Eventually he believes he has hit on the solution: a former West End actress has adopted an elaborate disguise to carry out the disposal of the diamonds and raise ready cash to flee on a liner heading for South America. He races to Portugal in the hope of catching her and her partner-in-crime, whose ultimate identity gives him a great shock.

== Bibliography ==
- Evans, Curtis. Masters of the "Humdrum" Mystery: Cecil John Charles Street, Freeman Wills Crofts, Alfred Walter Stewart and the British Detective Novel, 1920-1961. McFarland, 2014.
- Herbert, Rosemary. Whodunit?: A Who's Who in Crime & Mystery Writing. Oxford University Press, 2003.
- Reilly, John M. Twentieth Century Crime & Mystery Writers. Springer, 2015.
