= The Five Red Herrings =

1931 mystery novel by Dorothy L Sayers

- First edition
- Author: Dorothy L. Sayers
- Language: English
- Series: Lord Peter Wimsey
- Genre: Mystery novel
- Publisher: Victor Gollancz Ltd
- Publication date: 1931
- Publication place: United Kingdom
- Media type: Print
- Pages: 351
- Preceded by: Strong Poison
- Followed by: Have His Carcase

The Five Red Herrings (also The 5 Red Herrings) is a 1931 mystery novel by Dorothy L. Sayers, her sixth featuring the fictional gentleman detective named Lord Peter Wimsey. In the United States it was published in the same year under the title Suspicious Characters. The novel follows Lord Peter's efforts to solve the mystery of a Scottish painter who is found dead next to a canvas painted in his style by another artist, leading suspicion to fall on six talented artists in the area who had disputes with the dead man. Lord Peter realizes that one of the six artists is the criminal, while the other five are red herrings.

== Plot ==
Significant locations in the novel – a sketch map.

The novel is set in Galloway, a part of Scotland popular with artists and recreational fishermen. Sandy Campbell is a talented painter, but also a notoriously quarrelsome drunkard. When he is found dead in a stream, with a still-wet half-finished painting on the bank above, it is assumed that he fell in accidentally, fracturing his skull. Lord Peter Wimsey, who is in the region on a fishing holiday, suspects murder when he realises that something is missing from the scene which makes it likely that another artist painted the picture. Sayers includes a parenthetical note at this point: "Here Lord Peter Wimsey told the Sergeant what he was looking for and why, but as the intelligent reader will readily supply these details for himself, they are omitted from this page." A local doctor believes that the degree of rigor mortis suggests that Campbell died during the previous night.

Whoever killed Campbell also executed the painting in Campbell's distinctive style, to contrive the appearance of an accident. Six talented artists in the area have had recent public brawls with Campbell: Farren, Strachan, Gowan, Graham, Waters, and Ferguson. One of the six is the criminal, and five are red herrings.

All the suspects behave suspiciously: some leave the district without explanation, others give obviously inaccurate statements or conceal facts. Wimsey investigates, with some assistance from his friend in London, Charles Parker. The task of identifying the culprit is made more difficult because of the complexities of the local train timetables, the easy availability of bicycles, and the resultant opportunities for the murderer to evade notice.

All six suspects are eventually traced and give statements in which they deny killing Campbell, but none are entirely satisfactory. The Procurator Fiscal, the Chief Constable and the investigating police officers meet with Wimsey to review the evidence. The police put forward several theories, implicating all of the suspects either as killer or as accessory. Asked for his opinion, Wimsey finally reveals that the true killer was in fact Ferguson, the only one of the artists who while painting often kept spare tubes of paint in his pocket. Ferguson had absentmindedly pocketed a tube of white while creating the faked painting; it was the absence of that tube that Wimsey had noted at the start. The police are sceptical, but Wimsey offers a reconstruction, and over the course of twenty-four hours demonstrates how the killer established a false alibi: he ensured that he was seen boarding a train to Glasgow, disembarked before the train left the station, staged the scene above the stream and faked Campbell's painting, bicycled to another train station, and took a quicker train to Glasgow, ensuring that he would arrive in Glasgow as expected and be presumed to have been on the first train when the painting was staged.

Ferguson confesses, but states that Campbell's death happened accidentally during a fight, and was not murder. When the case is tried, the jury brings in a verdict of manslaughter, with a strong recommendation to mercy on the ground that "Campbell was undoubtedly looking for trouble".

== Principal characters ==
- Lord Peter Wimsey
- Mervyn Bunter: Wimsey's manservant
- Sandy Campbell (deceased): artist
- Hugh Farren: artist and suspect; Gilda Farren: his wife
- Henry Strachan: golf club secretary, artist and suspect
- Matthew Gowan: wealthy artist and suspect
- Jock Graham: artist and suspect
- Michael Waters: English artist and suspect
- John Ferguson: Campbell's next-door neighbour, artist and suspect
- Sir Maxwell Jamieson: Chief Constable
- Inspector Macpherson: Kirkcudbright Police
- Sergeant Dalziel: Newton Stewart Police

== Foreword ==
The novel includes a foreword in the form of a personal letter from the author "To my friend Joe Dignam, kindliest of landlords". The letter starts: "Here at last is your book about Gatehouse and Kirkcudbright. All the places are real places and all the trains are real trains, and all the landscapes are correct, except that I have run up a few new houses here and there."

== Literary significance and criticism ==
The first edition was reviewed in The Spectator of 1931 by M. I. Cole, who found the rather indistinguishable artist suspects, and the elaborate examination of timetables, ticket punches and so on, to be really taxing to the intelligence. He noted that Lord Peter Wimsey and the author's usual pleasant fantasies have retired into the background leaving a "pure-puzzle" book which is disappointing, dry, and dull. He acknowledged, however, that it has been appreciated immensely by puzzle fanatics who possess "the type of mind that goes on solving crossword puzzles for ever and ever".

In A Catalogue of Crime (revised edn 1989), Jacques Barzun and Wendell Hertig Taylor called The Five Red Herrings "A work that grows on rereading and remains in the mind as one of the richest, most colorful of her group studies. The Scottish setting, the artists in the colony, the train-ticket puzzle, and the final chase place this triumph among the four or five chefs d'oeuvre from her hand."

== Adaptations ==
The Five Red Herrings was adapted for television in 1975 as part of a series starring Ian Carmichael as Lord Peter and Glyn Houston as Bunter. It has also been dramatised for BBC Radio with Carmichael as Lord Peter and Peter Jones as Bunter.
