= Freeman Wills Crofts =

Irish mystery author, later based in England

- Freeman Wills Crofts
- Born: 1 June 1879; Dublin, Ireland
- Died: 11 April 1957 (aged 77); Worthing, West Sussex, England
- Occupations: Civil engineer, novelist
- Writing career
- Language: English
- Genres: Detective novel, murder mystery
- Notable works: The 12:30 from Croydon, Inspector French and the Starvel Tragedy
- Movement: Golden age of detective fiction

Freeman Wills Crofts FRSA (1 June 1879 – 11 April 1957) was an Irish engineer and mystery author, remembered best for his Inspector French novels, starting with Inspector French's Greatest Case (1924).

A railway engineer by training, Crofts introduced railway themes into many of his stories, which were notable for their intricate planning. Although Raymond Chandler, Agatha Christie, and authors of the so-called golden age of detective fiction are more famous, he was esteemed by those authors, and many of his books are still in print.

== Birth and education ==
Crofts was born at 26 Waterloo Road, Dublin, Ireland. His father, also named Freeman Wills Crofts, was a surgeon-lieutenant in the Army Medical Service but he died of fever in Honduras before the young Freeman Wills Crofts was born. In 1883, Crofts' mother, née Celia Frances Wise, married the Venerable Jonathan Harding, Vicar of Gilford, County Down, later Archdeacon of Dromore, and Crofts was raised in the vicarage at Gilford. He attended Methodist College and Campbell College in Belfast. In 1912 he married Mary Bellas Canning, daughter of the manager of the Coleraine branch of the Provincial Bank.

== Engineering career ==
In 1896, at the age of seventeen, Crofts was apprenticed to his maternal uncle, Berkeley Deane Wise, who was chief engineer of the Belfast and Northern Counties Railway. In 1899 Crofts was appointed Junior Assistant on the construction of the Strabane–Derry extension of the Donegal Railway Company. In 1900, he became District Engineer at Coleraine for the Northern Counties Committee of the London, Midland and Scottish Railway at a salary of £100pa, living at 11 Lodge Road in the town. In 1922, Crofts was promoted to Chief Assistant Engineer of the railway, based in Belfast. He lived at 'Grianon' in Jordanstown, a quiet village some six miles north of Belfast, to travel by train each day to the railway's offices at York Road. One of the projects he worked on was the design of the Bleach Green Viaduct in Whiteabbey, close to his Jordanstown home. This was a significant 10-arch reinforced concrete viaduct approved in 1927 and completed in 1934. It carried a new loop line which eliminated the need for trains between Belfast and the north west to reverse at Greenisland. Croft continued his engineering career until 1929. In his last task as an engineer, he was commissioned by the Government of Northern Ireland to chair an inquiry into the Bann and Lough Neagh Drainage Scheme.

== Writing career ==
In 1919, during an absence from work due to a long illness, Crofts wrote his first novel, The Cask (1920), which established him as a new master of detective fiction. Crofts continued to write steadily, producing a book almost every year for thirty years, in addition to a number of short stories and plays.

He is remembered best for his fictional detective, Inspector Joseph French, who was introduced in his fifth book, Inspector French's Greatest Case (1924). Inspector French always solved each of the mysteries presented him in a workmanlike, precise manner – this method set him apart from most other fictional sleuths.

In 1929, Crofts abandoned his railway engineering career and became a full-time writer. He settled in the village of Blackheath, near Guildford, in Surrey, and a number of his books are set in the Guildford area, including The Hog's Back Mystery (1933) and Crime at Guildford (1935). Many of his stories have a railway theme, and his particular interest in the apparently unfalsifiable alibi often emphasized the intricacies of railway timetables. Near the end of his life, he and his wife relocated to Worthing, Sussex in 1953, where they lived until his death in 1957, the year in which his last book was published.

Crofts also wrote one religious book, The Four Gospels in One Story, several short stories, and short plays for the BBC.

== Marriage, affiliations and other interests ==
In 1912 he wed Mary Bellas Canning, the daughter of John J. C. Canning of Coleraine, Ireland, bank manager. They had no children.

He was a member, with Dorothy L. Sayers and Agatha Christie, of the Detection Club which met in Gerrard Street.

In 1939 he was elected a fellow of the Royal Society of Arts.

Crofts was not only a railway engineer and writer, but also an accomplished musician. He was organist and choirmaster in Killowen Parish Church, Coleraine, St Patrick's Church, Jordanstown and the parish church of St Martin's in Blackheath.

== Reputation ==
Crofts was esteemed, not only by his regular readers, but also by his fellow writers of the so-called Golden Age of Detective Fiction. Agatha Christie included parodies of Inspector French alongside Sherlock Holmes and her own Hercule Poirot in Partners in Crime (1929).

Raymond Chandler described him as "the soundest builder of them all when he doesn’t get too fancy" (in The Simple Art of Murder). His attention to detail and his concentration on the mechanics of detection makes him the forerunner of the "police procedural" school of crime fiction.

However, it has also given rise to a suggestion of a certain lack of flair – Julian Symons describing him as of "the humdrum school". This may explain why his name has not remained as familiar as other more imaginative Golden Age writers, although he had 15 books included in the Penguin Books "green" series of the best detective novels and 36 of his books were in print in paperback in 2000.

== List of works ==
=== Novels ===
- The Cask (1920)
- The Ponson Case (1921)
- The Pit-Prop Syndicate (1922)
- The Groote Park Murder (1923)
- Inspector French's Greatest Case (1924)
- The Cheyne Mystery (1926) a.k.a. Inspector French and the Cheyne Mystery
- Inspector French and the Starvel Tragedy (1927), serialised in Westminster Gazette (1927); a.k.a. The Starvel Hollow Tragedy
- The Sea Mystery (1928)
- The Box Office Murders (1929) a.k.a. The Purple Sickle Murders
- Sir John Magill's Last Journey (1930)
- Mystery in the Channel (1931) a.k.a. Mystery in the English Channel
- Sudden Death (1932)
- Death on the Way (1932) a.k.a. Double Death and serialised in the Sunday Post (1932) as The Shadows
- The Hog's Back Mystery (1933) a.k.a. The Strange Case of Dr. Earle
- The 12:30 from Croydon (1934) a.k.a. Wilful and Premeditated
- Mystery on Southampton Water (1934) a.k.a. Crime on the Solent
- Crime at Guildford (1935) a.k.a. The Crime at Nornes
- The Loss of the Jane Vosper (1936)
- Man Overboard! (1936) a.k.a. Cold-Blooded Murder
- Found Floating (1937), serialised, Daily Mail (1937)
- The End of Andrew Harrison (1938) a.k.a. The Futile Alibi
- Antidote to Venom (1938)
- Fatal Venture (1939) a.k.a. Tragedy in the Hollow
- Golden Ashes (1940)
- James Tarrant, Adventurer (1941) a.k.a. Circumstantial Evidence
- The Losing Game (1941) a.k.a. A Losing Game
- Fear Comes to Chalfont (1942)
- The Affair at Little Wokeham (1943) a.k.a. Double Tragedy
- Enemy Unseen (1945)
- Death of a Train (1946). Serialised, New York Daily News (1946)
- Young Robin Brand, Detective (1947) A Juvenile Detective Novel with Inspector French.
- Silence for the Murderer (1949). Serialised, New York Daily News (1948)
- French Strikes Oil (1951) a.k.a. Dark Journey
- Anything to Declare? (1957)

=== Short story collections ===
- Murderers Make Mistakes (1947)
  - Part One: Double Stories:
    - The Old Gun
    - The Cliff Path
    - The Telephone Call
    - The Lower Flat
    - The Army Truck
    - The Invalid Colonel
    - The Hidden Sten Gun
    - The Hunt Ball
    - The Avaricious Moneylender
    - The Evening Visitor
    - The Enthusiastic Rabbit-Breeder
    - The Retired Wine Merchant
  - Part Two: Single Stories:
    - The Home Guard Trench
    - The Playwright's Manuscript
    - The Limestone Quarry
    - The L-Shaped Room
    - The Stolen Hand Grenade
    - The Relief Signalman
    - The Burning Barn
    - The Solicitors' Holiday
    - The Swinging Boom
    - The Fireside Mountaineer
    - The Waiting Car
- Many a Slip (1955)
  - The Aspirins
  - Boomerang
  - The Broken Windscreen
  - The Brothers Bing
  - Crime on the Footplate
  - The 8:12 from Waterloo
  - The Flowing Tide
  - The Footbridge
  - Gull Rock
  - The Icy Torrent
  - The Medicine Bottle
  - The Mountain Ledge
  - Mushroom Patties
  - The New Cement
  - The Photograph
  - The Ruined Tower
  - The Sign Manual
  - The Suitcase
  - Tea at Four
  - The Unseen Observer
  - The Upper Flat
- Mystery of the Sleeping Car Express and Other Stories (1956)
  - The Mystery of the Sleeping Car Express" (1921)
  - Mr Pemberton's Commission
  - The Greuze (Inspector French)
  - The Level Crossing" (1933)
  - East Wind (Inspector French)
  - The Parcel
  - The Motive Shows the Man
  - The Affair at Saltover Priory (Inspector French)
  - The Landing Ticket (Inspector French)
  - The Raincoat (Inspector French)
- The 9:50 Up Express and Other Mysteries. Crippen & Landru (2020) Edited by Tony Medawar, including a biographical note and comprehensive bibliography
  - Contents
  - The Master Of Alibis - by Tony Medawar
  - Part One:
  - The Casebook Of Inspector French:
  - Meet Inspector French
  - The Vertical Line
  - The Hunt Ball Murder
  - The Faulty Stroke
  - Teamwork Felonius
  - Dark Waters
  - The Target
  - The 9.50 Up Express
  - During The Night
  - Part Two:
  - Meet Robin Brand
  - Perilous Journey
  - Danger In Shroude Valley
  - Part Three:
  - Other Stories:
  - James Alcorn's Oversight
  - Murder By Deputy
  - Appendix A:
  - Why I write Detective Stories
  - Appendix B:
  - Who Killed Cock Robin ?
  - Bibliography

=== Stage plays ===
- Inspector French (a stage adaptation of the 1932 novel Sudden Death)
- During the Night (Revised version of Inspector French)

The programme for Inspector French advised the audience that the clues that enable the mystery to be solved are all given before the beginning of Act II. The play had two productions in Guildford in July and October 1937. The revised version in 1949, During the Night, was denied a license by the censor.

=== Radio plays ===
- The Nine Fifty Up Express. Collected in The Nine Fifty Up Express
- Inspector French and The Starvel Tragedy was adapted by Alan Downer and broadcast in Dec 1987 on BBC Radio 4 in the UK.

=== Non-fiction ===
- How to Write a Detective Novel
- The Four Gospels in One Story: written as a modern biography
- A New Zealand Tragedy (1936), included in The Anatomy of Murder by The Detection Club
- The Gorse Hall Mystery (1938) Included in Great Unsolved Crimes by Dorothy Sayers and others.

=== Anthologies containing stories by Freeman Wills Crofts ===
- Great Short Stories of Detection, Mystery and Horror 2nd Series (1931)
- Great Short Stories of Detection, Mystery and Horror 3rd Series (1934)
- The Mystery Book (1934)
- The Great Book of Thrillers (1935)
- The Evening Standard Detective Book (1950)
- The Case of the Vanishing Spinster, and other mystery stories, chosen by Susan Dickinson (1972)
- Fifty Famous Detectives of Fiction (1983)
- The Scoop and Behind the Screen (1983) (Originally published in The Listener (1931) and (1930), both written by members of The Detection Club)
- Great Irish Detective Stories, edited by Peter Haining (1993)
- The Longman Anthology of Detective Fiction (2004)
- Bodies from the Library, edited by Tony Medawar (2018). Includes the short story 'Dark Waters'

"A Century of DETECTIVE STORIES With an Introduction by G.K. CHESTERTON" (Hutchinson & Co). Includes the short story 'The Grueze'

=== Lost short stories ===
These stories are known to have been published but no copies of the publications concerned are believed to exist presently.

- "Nemesis", published in Round About [Guildford Round Table Christmas Annual, 1933]

== Adaptations of work in other media ==
Free @ Last TV, who produced the Sky1/Acorn TV series Agatha Raisin are developing a television series based on the Inspector French novels.

== Sources ==
Oxford Dictionary of National Biography
