= Inspector French =

Fictional detective

Joseph French
- First appearance: Inspector French's Greatest Case
- Last appearance: Anything to Declare?
- Created by: Freeman Wills Crofts

In-universe information
- Gender: Male
- Occupation: Police inspector
- Nationality: British

Inspector Joseph French is a fictional British police detective created by Irish author Freeman Wills Crofts. French was a prominent detective from the Golden Age of Detective Fiction, appearing in twenty-nine novels and a number of short stories between 1924 and 1957. The character was introduced in the 1924 novel Inspector French's Greatest Case, in which he investigates a fatal diamond robbery in Hatton Garden. The series relied largely on puzzle mysteries.

== Overview ==
French was a prominent detective from the Golden Age of Detective Fiction, appearing in twenty-nine novels and a number of short stories between 1924 and 1957. French is a Scotland Yard detective, whose methodical technique breaks down complex alibis. Over the course of the series, he is promoted to Chief Inspector and later to Superintendent. His manner is courteous, he is happily married and has no major problems in his private life.

== Novels ==
- Inspector French's Greatest Case (1924)
- The Cheyne Mystery (1926)
- The Starvel Tragedy (1927)
- The Sea Mystery (1928)
- The Box Office Murders (1929)
- Sir John Magill's Last Journey (1930)
- Mystery in the Channel (1931)
- Sudden Death (1932)
- Death on the Way (1932)
- The Hog's Back Mystery (1933)
- The 12:30 from Croydon (1934)
- Mystery on Southampton Water (1934)
- Crime at Guildford (1935)
- The Loss of the Jane Vosper (1936)
- Man Overboard! (1936)
- Found Floating (1937)
- The End of Andrew Harrison (1938)
- Antidote to Venom (1938)
- Fatal Venture (1939)
- Golden Ashes (1940)
- James Tarrant, Adventurer (1941)
- The Losing Game (1941)
- Fear Comes to Chalfont (1942)
- The Affair at Little Wokeham (1943)
- Enemy Unseen (1945)
- Death of a Train (1946)
- Silence for the Murderer (1949)
- French Strikes Oil (1951)
- Anything to Declare? (1957)

== Adaptations ==
=== BBC Radio ===
Several adaptations of the French stories were produced for BBC Radio over the years:

- 1943–1945 saw a series for the General Forces Programme entitled "Chief Inspector French's Cases", starring Milton Rosmer, and featuring original scripts written by Crofts himself.
- Adaptations for the Home Service in the 1950s included Mr. Pemberton's Commission with Roger Delgado, The Greuze with Norman Mitchell, and East Wind with Frank Tickle.
- In 1984, the short story "The Yang Chi Jade" was adapted for Radio Four's Saturday Night Theatre with William Eedle as French, whilst a 1987 dramatisation of Inspector French and the Starvel Tragedy starred Edward de Souza as the Inspector.

=== Proposed television series ===
In July 2019, Brendan Foley was announced to adapt the Inspector French novels as a television series, with independent production company Free@LastTV on board to produce. There has been no word on the series since then.

== Bibliography ==
- Evans, Curtis. Masters of the "Humdrum" Mystery: Cecil John Charles Street, Freeman Wills Crofts, Alfred Walter Stewart and the British Detective Novel, 1920-1961. McFarland, 2014.
- Herbert, Rosemary. Whodunit?: A Who's Who in Crime & Mystery Writing. Oxford University Press, 2003.
- James, Russell. Great British Fictional Detectives. Remember When, 2009.
- Reilly, John M. Twentieth Century Crime & Mystery Writers. Springer, 2015.
