= Sir Clinton Driffield =

Fictional detective

- First appearance: Murder in the Maze
- Last appearance: Common Sense Is All You Need
- Created by: J.J. Connington

In-universe information
- Gender: Male
- Occupation: Chief Constable
- Nationality: British

Sir Clinton Driffield is a fictional police detective created by the British author J.J. Connington. He was one of numerous detectives created during the Golden Age of Detective Fiction, making his first appearance in Murder in the Maze in 1927. He appeared in four subsequent novels by 1929 when Connington apparently wished to write him out following Nemesis at Raynham Parva. However, his replacement Superintendent Ross failed to gain the same level of popularity over two novels and Sir Clinton returned in the 1931 mystery The Boathouse Riddle. He went on to appear in a further eleven novels. The last entry Common Sense Is All You Need was published the year of Connington's death in 1947 and is set in wartime Britain.

== Character biography ==
Driffield is a former colonial official in South Africa who on returning home has taken over the role of Chief Constable of a rural English county. His cases revolve around the market town of Ambledown and the nearby country estates. The plots often mingle the "fair play" detective story with the country house mystery, both genres at their height at the time. He is frequently accompanied by his friend, the wealthy landowner and magistrate Wendover, whom he affectionately calls squire due to his social position and traditional, conservative views.

Connington was the pen-name of the chemist and academic Alfred Walter Stewart. While popular at the time of publication, the books went out of print in subsequent decades. One modern encyclopaedia of crime fiction describes Sir Clinton Driffield as an "also-ran of the Golden Age". In his 1972 work Bloody Murder the crime writer and historian Julian Symons dubbed Connington as one of the "humdrum" writers of detective fiction along with Freeman Wills Crofts and Cecil Street.

== Novels ==
- Murder in the Maze (1927)
- Tragedy at Ravensthorpe (1927)
- Mystery at Lynden Sands (1928)
- The Case with Nine Solutions (1928)
- Nemesis at Raynham Parva (1929)
- The Boathouse Riddle (1931)
- The Sweepstake Murders (1931)
- The Castleford Conundrum (1932)
- The Ha-Ha Case (1934)
- In Whose Dim Shadow (1935)
- A Minor Operation (1937)
- Truth Comes Limping (1938)
- For Murder Will Speak (1938)
- The Twenty-One Clues (1941)
- No Past Is Dead (1942)
- Jack-in-the-Box (1944)
- Common Sense Is All You Need (1947)

== Bibliography ==
- Evans, Curtis. Masters of the "Humdrum" Mystery: Cecil John Charles Street, Freeman Wills Crofts, Alfred Walter Stewart and the British Detective Novel, 1920-1961. McFarland, 2014.
- Herbert, Rosemary. Whodunit?: A Who's Who in Crime & Mystery Writing. Oxford University Press, 2003.
- James, Russell. Great British Fictional Detectives. Remember When, 2009.
- Reilly, John M. Twentieth Century Crime & Mystery Writers. Springer, 2015.
