= Golden Age of Detective Fiction =

Era of murder mystery novels

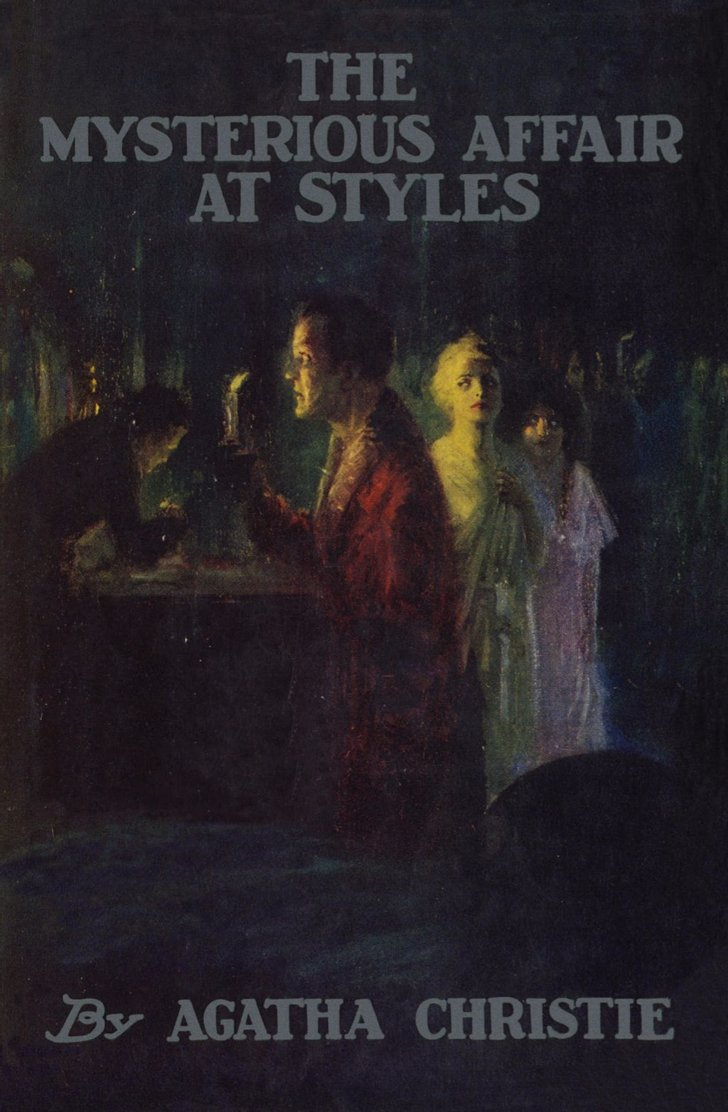
Cover of The Mysterious Affair at Styles, the first book featuring Hercule Poirot, by Agatha Christie

The Golden Age of Detective Fiction was an era of classic murder mystery novels of similar patterns and styles, predominantly in the 1920s and 1930s. While the Golden Age proper is usually taken to refer to works from that period, this type of fiction has been written since at least 1911 and is still being written.

In his history of the detective story, Bloody Murder: From the Detective Story to the Crime Novel, the author Julian Symons heads two chapters devoted to the Golden Age as "the Twenties" and "the Thirties". Symons notes that Philip Van Doren Stern's article, "The Case of the Corpse in the Blind Alley" (1941), "could serve ... as an obituary for the Golden Age." Authors Agatha Christie, Dorothy L. Sayers, Margery Allingham, and Ngaio Marsh have been collectively called the Queens of Crime.

== Description of the genre ==
Certain conventions and clichés were established that limited any surprises on the part of the reader to the details of the plot and, primarily, to the identity of the murderer. The majority of novels of that era were "whodunits", and several authors excelled, after misleading their readers successfully, in revealing the least likely suspect convincingly as the villain. There was also a predilection for certain casts of characters and certain settings in a secluded English country house and its upper-class inhabitants (although they were generally landed gentry; not aristocracy with their country house as a second house). The rules of the game – and Golden Age mysteries were considered games – were codified in 1929 by Ronald Knox.

According to Knox, a detective story "must have as its main interest the unravelling of a mystery; a mystery whose elements are clearly presented to the reader at an early stage in the proceedings, and whose nature is such as to arouse curiosity, a curiosity which is gratified at the end." Knox's "Ten Commandments", also known as "Knox Decalogue", are as follows:

1. The criminal must be mentioned in the early part of the story, but must not be anyone whose thoughts the reader has been allowed to know.
2. All supernatural or preternatural agencies are ruled out as a matter of course.
3. Not more than one secret room or passage is allowable.
4. No hitherto undiscovered poisons may be used, nor any appliance which will need a long scientific explanation at the end.
5. No Chinaman must figure in the story. (Note: The "No Chinaman rule" was a reaction to, and criticism of, anti-Chinese stereotypes prevalent in 1920s Western literature. Knox explained: "I see no reason in the nature of things why a Chinaman should spoil a detective story. But as a matter of fact, if you are turning over the pages of an unknown romance in a bookstore, and come across some mention of the narrow, slit-like eyes of Chin Loo, avoid that story; it is bad.")
6. No accident must ever help the detective, nor must he ever have an unaccountable intuition which proves to be right.
7. The detective himself must not commit the crime.
8. The detective is bound to declare any clues which he may discover.
9. The "sidekick" of the detective, the Watson, must not conceal from the reader any thoughts which pass through his mind: his intelligence must be slightly, but very slightly, below that of the average reader.
10. Twin brothers, and doubles generally, must not appear unless we have been duly prepared for them.

A similar but more detailed list of prerequisites was prepared by S. S. Van Dine in an article entitled "Twenty Rules for Writing Detective Stories", which appeared in The American Magazine in September 1928. They are commonly referred to as Van Dine's Commandments.

== Decline in popularity ==
The outbreak of the Second World War is often taken as a beginning of the end for the light-hearted, straightforward "whodunit" of the Golden Age. As Ian Ousby writes, the Golden Age "was a long time a-dying. Indeed, one could argue that it still is not dead, since its mannerisms have proved stubbornly persistent in writers one might have expected to abandon them altogether as dated, or worse. Yet the Second World War marked a significant close, just as the First World War had marked a significant beginning." He further writes: "Even by the 1930s its assumptions were being challenged. Where it had once been commonplace to view the Golden Age as a high watermark of achievement, it became equally the fashion to denounce it. It had, so the indictment ran, followed rules which trivialized its subject. It had preferred settings which expressed a narrow, if not deliberately elitist, vision of society. And for heroes it had created detectives at best two-dimensional, at worst tiresome."

Attacks on the genre were made by, among others, the influential writer and critic Julian Symons, who was dismissive of postwar detective fiction in Bloody Murder, and Raymond Chandler ("The Simple Art of Murder"). Len Deighton wrote the spy thriller The IPCRESS File to be "ragged and untidy, as life is", and an inversion of "the detective novels of the Thirties". In sheer number of sales—particularly those of Agatha Christie—modern detective fiction has never approached the popularity of Golden Age writing. David Lehman writes in the Boston Review in 2000: "Every so often somebody reprises Edmund Wilson's famous put-down of detective novels, 'Who Cares Who Killed Roger Ackroyd?' Wilson regarded the genre as terminally subliterary, either an addiction or a harmless vice on a par with crossword puzzles. But the truth is that for every Edmund Wilson who resists the genre there are dozens of intellectuals who have embraced it wholeheartedly. The enduring highbrow appeal of the detective novel is one of the literary marvels of the century."

== Enduring influence ==
Current writing influenced by the Golden Age style is often referred to as "cosy" mystery writing, as distinct from the "hardboiled" style popular in the United States. Recent writers working in this style include Sarah Caudwell, Ruth Dudley Edwards, Peter Lovesey and Simon Brett. Television series that emulate the style include Murder, She Wrote and Midsomer Murders. Films and TV series based on the classic Golden Age novels continue to be produced. In 1930, a group of British Golden Age authors came together to form the Detection Club. In addition to meeting for dinners and helping each other with technical aspects of their work, the members agreed to adhere to Knox's Commandments. Anthony Berkeley was instrumental in setting up the club, and G. K. Chesterton was its first president. In 2015, Martin Edwards became the club's ninth president.

The Country house mystery was a popular genre of English detective fiction in the 1920s and 1930s; set in the residences of the gentry and often involving a murder in a country house temporarily isolated by a snowstorm or similar with the suspects all at a weekend house party. The board game Cluedo (Clue in North America) relies on the structure of the country house mystery.

From the late 1980s to the early 1990s, a number of mystery writers who were influenced by the Golden Age style made their debut one after another in Japan. They are referred to as "new traditionalists" (新本格ミステリ作家, shin honkaku misuteri sakka; lit. new orthodox mystery writers) or "new orthodox school" (新本格派, shin honkaku ha). Representative "new traditionalists" include writers such as Yukito Ayatsuji, Gosho Aoyama, Rintaro Norizuki and Taku Ashibe.

== Popular authors ==
Most of the authors of the Golden Age were British or Irish. Some American authors had a more hard-boiled style.

=== British or Irish ===
- Margery Allingham
- Sir Henry Aubrey-Fletcher, 6th Baronet
- Dorothy Bowers
- Lynn Brock
- G. K. Chesterton
- Agatha Christie
- Joan Coggin
- Anthony Berkeley Cox
- John Creasey
- Edmund Crispin
- Freeman Wills Crofts
- Cecil Day-Lewis
- Joseph Jefferson Farjeon
- R. Austin Freeman
- Georgette Heyer
- Anne Hocking
- Ronald Knox
- E. C. R. Lorac
- Philip MacDonald
- Gladys Mitchell
- E. R. Punshon
- Dorothy L. Sayers
- Alfred Walter Stewart
- J. I. M. Stewart
- Josephine Tey
- Edgar Wallace
- Patricia Wentworth

=== American ===
- Earl Derr Biggers
- John Dickson Carr
- Frances Crane
- Elizabeth Daly
- Frederick Van Rensselaer Dey
- S. S. Van Dine
- Walter B. Gibson
- Frank Gruber
- Brett Halliday
- John P. Marquand
- Ellery Queen
- Mary Roberts Rinehart
- Rex Stout
- Phoebe Atwood Taylor
- Louis Joseph Vance
- Hillary Waugh

=== Other ===
- Ngaio Marsh (New Zealand)
- Georges Simenon (Belgian)

== Popular fictional characters ==
"First appearances" listed here only refer to full-length novels and not short stories or story collections.

- Albert Campion, created by Margery Allingham, first appearing in The Crime at Black Dudley (1929)
- Anthony Gethryn, created by Philip MacDonald, first appearing in The Rasp (1924)
- Asey Mayo, created by Phoebe Atwood Taylor, first appearing in The Cape Cod Mystery (1931)
- Charlie Chan, created by Earl Derr Biggers, first appearing in The House Without a Key (1925)
- Dr. Thorndyke, created by R. Austin Freeman, first appearing in The Red Thumb Mark (1907)
- Drury Lane, created by Ellery Queen, first appearing in The Tragedy of X (1932)
- Ellery Queen, created by Ellery Queen, first appearing in The Roman Hat Mystery (1929)
- George Gideon, created by John Creasey, first appearing in Gideon's Day (1955)
- Gervase Fen, created by Edmund Crispin, first appearing in The Case of the Gilded Fly (1944)
- Gideon Fell, created by John Dickson Carr, first appearing in Hag's Nook (1933)
- Hercule Poirot, created by Agatha Christie, first appearing in The Mysterious Affair at Styles (1920)
- Inspector French, created by Freeman Wills Crofts, first appearing in Inspector French's Greatest Case (1924)
- Johnny Fletcher, created by Frank Gruber, first appearing in The French Key (1940)
- Jules Maigret, created by Georges Simenon, first appearing in The Strange Case of Peter the Lett (1931)
- Leonidas Witherall, created by Phoebe Atwood Taylor, first appearing in Beginning with a Bash (1937)
- Lone Wolf, created by Louis Joseph Vance, first appearing in The Lone Wolf (1914)
- Lord Peter Wimsey, created by Dorothy L. Sayers, first appearing in Whose Body? (1923)
- Michael Shayne, created by Brett Halliday, first appearing in Dividend on Death (1939)
- Miss Marple, created by Agatha Christie, first appearing in The Murder at the Vicarage (1930)
- Mr. Moto, created by John P. Marquand, first appearing in Your Turn, Mr. Moto (1935)
- Mrs Bradley, created by Gladys Mitchell, first appearing in Speedy Death (1929)
- Nero Wolfe, created by Rex Stout, first appearing in Fer-de-Lance (1934)
- Nigel Strangeways, created by Cecil Day-Lewis, first appearing in A Question of Proof (1935)
- Philo Vance, created by S. S. Van Dine, first appearing in The Benson Murder Case (1926)
- Roderick Alleyn, created by Ngaio Marsh, first appearing in A Man Lay Dead (1934)
- Sir Clinton Driffield, created by Alfred Walter Stewart, first appearing in Murder in the Maze (1927)
- Sir Henry Merrivale, created by John Dickson Carr, first appearing in The Plague Court Murders (1934)
- Sir John Appleby, created by J. I. M. Stewart, first appearing in Death at the President's Lodging (1936)
- The Toff, created by John Creasey, first appearing in Introducing the Toff (1938)
- Tommy and Tuppence, created by Agatha Christie, first appearing in The Secret Adversary (1922)
