= 1945 in literature =

This article contains information about the literary events and publications of 1945.

== Events ==
- January – In Paris, journalist and poet Robert Brasillach is tried and found guilty of "intelligence with the (German) enemy" during World War II, sparking a major dispute in French society over collaboration with Nazi Germany and clemency.
- c. January 1 – Jean-Paul Sartre refuses the Légion d'honneur.
- January 27 – Primo Levi is among those liberated from the Auschwitz concentration camp complex.
- February – Aleksandr Solzhenitsyn is sentenced to eight years in a labour camp for criticizing Joseph Stalin.
- February 13–15 – The bombing of Dresden in World War II is seen by the German Jewish diarist Victor Klemperer, the novelist Kurt Vonnegut as an American prisoner of war, and Miles Tripp as a British bomb aimer. It will feature in Józef Mackiewicz's novel Sprawa pulkownika Miasojedowa (Colonel Miasoyedov's Case, 1962), Bohumil Hrabal's Ostře sledované vlaky (Closely Observed Trains, 1965) and Vonnegut's Slaughterhouse-Five, or The Children's Crusade: A Duty-Dance with Death (1969).
- March 4 – Poet Pablo Neruda is elected a Chilean senator and officially joins the Communist Party of Chile four months later.
- March 8 – Federico García Lorca's play The House of Bernarda Alba, completed just before his assassination in 1936, is first performed, in Buenos Aires.
- March 31 – Tennessee Williams' semi-autobiographical "memory play" The Glass Menagerie (1944, adapted from a short story) opens on Broadway at the Playhouse Theatre (New York City), starring Laurette Taylor and winning the New York Drama Critics' Circle Award.
- About end March – Jack Kerouac and William S. Burroughs complete their mystery novel And the Hippos Were Boiled in Their Tanks, a fictionalization of manslaughter committed in 1944 by their friend Lucien Carr, but it will not appear fully until 2008.
- May – The Estonian poet Heiti Talvik is deported to Siberia and never heard of again.
- May 2
  - The expatriate American poet Ezra Pound is arrested by the Italian resistance movement and taken to its headquarters in Chiavari, but soon released as of no interest. On May 5, he turns himself in to the United States Army. He is held in a military detention camp outside Pisa, spending 25 days in an open cage before being given a tent. There he appears to suffer a nervous breakdown. While in the camp he drafts The Pisan Cantos.
  - French novelist Colette is the first woman admitted to the Académie Goncourt.
- May 8 – The occupying powers in Allied-occupied Germany and Austria impose publishing curbs as part of denazification.
- June – Ern Malley hoax: Australia's most celebrated literary hoax takes place when Angry Penguins is published with poems by the fictional Ern Malley. Poets James McAuley and Harold Stewart created the poems from lines of other published work and then sent them as the purported work of a recently deceased poet. The hoax is played on Max Harris, at this time a 22-year-old avant garde poet and critic who had started the modernist magazine Angry Penguins. Harris and his circle of literary friends agreed that a hitherto completely unknown modernist poet of great merit had come to light in suburban Australia. The Autumn 1944 edition of the magazine with the poems comes out in mid-1945 due to wartime printing delays with cover illustration by Sidney Nolan. An Australian newspaper uncovers the hoax within weeks. McAuley and Stewart loved early Modernist poets but despise later modernism and especially the well-funded Angry Penguins and are jealous of Harris's precocious success.
- c. July – Theatre Workshop is formed in the north of England by Joan Littlewood, Ewan MacColl and other former members of Theatre Union as a touring company.
- August 17 – The allegorical dystopian novella Animal Farm by George Orwell, a satire on Stalinism, is first published by Fredric Warburg in London.
- September 11 – The Citizens Theatre opens in Glasgow under this name.
- September – J. B. Priestley's drama An Inspector Calls is premièred in Russian translation in Leningrad.
- October – The National Library of Korea is established in Seoul in the newly-liberated country, inheriting the Government-General of Chōsen Library.
- October 29 – Vladimir Nabokov's 1940 application for U.S. citizenship is granted.
- November 1 – The U.S. magazine Ebony appears.
- November 21 – André Malraux is named Minister of Information by the new French President, Charles de Gaulle.
- November 26 – The U.K. film Brief Encounter, adapted from Noël Coward's short play Still Life, is released.
- November – Astrid Lindgren's children's book Pippi Långstrump, with illustrations by Ingrid Vang Nyman, is published in Sweden by Rabén & Sjögren, having won a competition run by the publisher for children's books in August. It introduces an anarchic child heroine. An English translation appears as Pippi Longstocking.
- December – Nag Hammadi library, a collection of Gnostic texts, is discovered in Upper Egypt.
- Canadian author Elizabeth Smart's novel in prose poetry By Grand Central Station I Sat Down and Wept is published in London (U.K.); the writer's mother Louise leads a successful campaign with government officials to have the book banned in Canada, buying up as many copies as she can find of those that make their way into the country and having them burned.

== New books ==
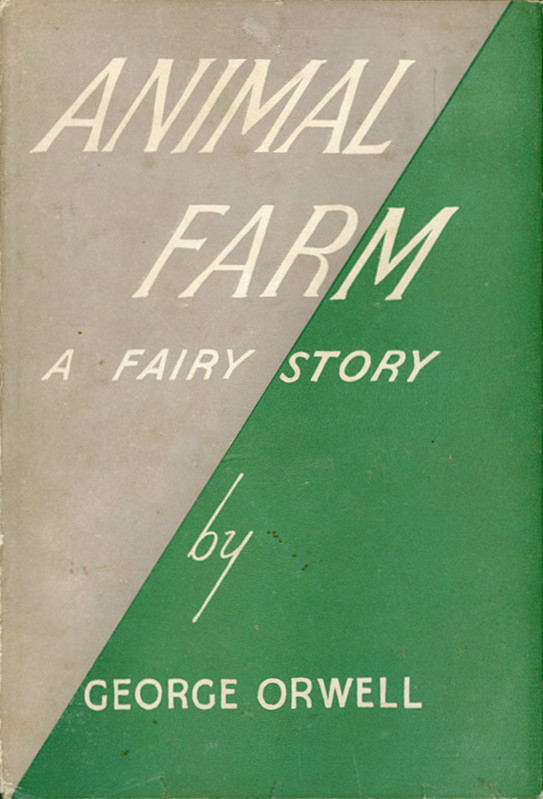
1st ed.

=== Fiction ===
- Ivo Andrić
  - The Bridge on the Drina (Na Drini Ćuprija)
  - Travnička hronika (Travnik Chronicle, Bosnian Chronicle, Bosnian Story, The Days of the Consuls)
  - Gospođica (The Young Lady, The Woman from Sarajevo)
- Nigel Balchin – Mine Own Executioner
- Charlotte Armstrong – The Innocent Flower
- Banine – Caucasian days (Jours caucasiens)
- Frans G. Bengtsson – The Long Ships (Röde Orm), part 2
- Adolfo Bioy Casares – A Plan for Escape (Plan de evasión)
- Robert Bloch – The Opener of the Way (anthology)
- Arna Bontemps – Anyplace But Here
- Victor Bridges – Trouble on the Thames
- Hermann Broch – The Death of Virgil (Der Tod des Vergil)
- Gwendolyn Brooks – A Street in Bronzeville
- Gerald Butler – Mad with Much Heart
- Taylor Caldwell – The Wide House
- John Dickson Carr (as Carter Dickson) – The Curse of the Bronze Lamp
- Winifred Carter – Princess Fitz
- Vera Caspary – Bedelia
- Peter Cheyney
  - I'll Say She Does
  - Night Club
  - Sinister Errand
- Agatha Christie – Sparkling Cyanide
- Thomas B. Costain – The Black Rose
- Gertrude Crampton – Tootle
- Edmund Crispin – Holy Disorders
- Freeman Wills Crofts – Enemy Unseen
- Sergiu Dan – Unde începe noaptea
- Simone de Beauvoir – The Blood of Others (Le Sang des autres)
- August Derleth
  - "In Re: Sherlock Holmes" – The Adventures of Solar Pons
  - Something Near
- C. S. Forester – The Commodore (also Commodore Hornblower)
- Varian Fry – Surrender on Demand
- Anthony Gilbert – Don't Open the Door
- Rumer Godden – A Fugue in Time
- Julien Gracq – A Dark Stranger
- Winston Graham – The Forgotten Story
- F.L. Green – Odd Man Out
- Henry Green – Loving
- James Hilton – So Well Remembered
- Chester Himes – If He Hollers Let Him Go
- Anne Hocking – The Vultures Gather
- Dorothy B. Hughes – Dread Journey
- Michael Innes – Appleby's End
- Ruth Krauss – The Carrot Seed
- Margery Lawrence – Number Seven, Queer Street
- Robert Lawson – Rabbit Hill
- J. Sheridan Le Fanu (d. 1873) – Green Tea and Other Ghost Stories
- C. S. Lewis – That Hideous Strength
- E. C. R. Lorac – Murder by Matchlight
- H. P. Lovecraft and August Derleth – The Lurker at the Threshold
- Compton Mackenzie – The North Wind of Love, Book 2 (last of The Four Winds of Love hexalogy)
- Hugh MacLennan – Two Solitudes
- Ngaio Marsh – Died in the Wool
- Gladys Mitchell – The Rising of the Moon
- Nancy Mitford – The Pursuit of Love
- R. K. Narayan – The English Teacher
- George Orwell – Animal Farm
- Gabrielle Roy – Bonheur d'occasion (The Tin Flute)
- Jean-Paul Sartre – L'Âge de raison (The Age of Reason)
- Elizabeth Smart – By Grand Central Station I Sat Down and Wept
- John Steinbeck – Cannery Row
- Noel Streatfeild – Saplings
- Cecil Street – Bricklayer's Arms
- Julian Symons – The Immaterial Murder Case
- James Thurber – The Thurber Carnival (anthology)
- Tarjei Vesaas – The House in the Dark
- Elio Vittorini – Uomini e no (Men and not Men)
- Mika Waltari – The Egyptian (Sinuhe egyptiläinen)
- Evangeline Walton – Witch House
- Evelyn Waugh – Brideshead Revisited
- Charles Williams – All Hallows' Eve
- Cornell Woolrich – Night Has a Thousand Eyes

=== Children and young people ===
- Rev. W. Awdry – The Three Railway Engines (first in 42 Railway Series books by Awdry and his son Christopher Awdry)
- Selina Chönz and Alois Carigiet – Uorsin (Schellen-Ursli. Ein Engadiner Bilderbuch, translated as A Bell for Ursli)
- Marguerite Henry – Justin Morgan Had a Horse
- Tove Jansson – The Moomins and the Great Flood (Småtrollen och den stora översvämningen, first in the Moomin series of 14 books)
- Jim Kjelgaard – Big Red
- Ruth Krauss – The Carrot Seed
- Robert Lawson – Rabbit Hill
- Lois Lenski – Strawberry Girl
- Astrid Lindgren – Pippi Longstocking (Pippi Långstrump, first in the Pippi Longstocking series of three full-length and six picture books)
- E. B. White – Stuart Little

=== Drama ===
- Jacinto Benavente – La infanzona
- Mary Chase – Harvey
- Warren Chetham-Strode – Young Mrs. Barrington
- Campbell Christie and Dorothy Christie – Grand National Night
- Eduardo De Filippo – Napoli milionaria (The Millions of Naples)
- Norman Ginsbury – The First Gentleman
- Jean Giraudoux (died 1944) – The Madwoman of Chaillot (La Folle de Chaillot)
- Curt Goetz – The House in Montevideo (Das Haus in Montevideo)
- Walter Greenwood – The Cure for Love
- Arthur Laurents – Home of the Brave
- John Perry – A Man About the House
- Colin Morris – Desert Rats
- J. B. Priestley – An Inspector Calls
- Irwin Shaw – The Assassin
- Edward Percy Smith – The Shop at Sly Corner
- Lesley Storm – Great Day
- Aimée Stuart – Lady from Edinburgh
- Vernon Sylvaine – Madame Louise
- Emlyn Williams – The Wind of Heaven

=== Poetry ===
- Idris Davies – Tonypandy and other poems

=== Non-fiction ===
- Ion Biberi – Lumea de mâine (World of Tomorrow)
- Vannevar Bush – As We May Think
- R. G. Collingwood – The Idea of Nature
- Françoise Frenkel – Rien où poser sa tête (No Place to Lay One's Head)
- Carlo Emilio Gadda – Eros e Priapo
- Jacquetta Hawkes – Early Britain
- Leonhard Huizinga – Six Candles for Indonesia (Zes kaarsen voor Indië)
- Aldous Huxley – The Perennial Philosophy
- Arthur Koestler – The Yogi and the Commissar and Other Essays
- Carlo Levi – Christ Stopped at Eboli (Cristo si è fermato a Eboli)
- C. S. Lewis – The Great Divorce (serialization concludes and book publication)
- Betty MacDonald – The Egg and I
- Maurice Merleau-Ponty – Phenomenology of Perception (Phénoménologie de la perception)
- Karl Popper – The Open Society and Its Enemies
- Bertrand Russell – A History of Western Philosophy And Its Connection with Political and Social Circumstances from the Earliest Times to the Present Day
- Ernesto Sabato – One and the Universe (Uno y el Universo)
- Arthur Schlesinger, Jr. – The Age of Jackson
- Henry DeWolf Smyth – Smyth Report (A General Account of the Development of Methods of Using Atomic Energy for Military Purposes)
- Seweryna Szmaglewska – Dymy nad Birkenau (Smoke over Birkenau)
- Richard Wright – Black Boy

== Births ==
- January 3 – David Starkey, English historian
- January 20 – Robert Olen Butler, American novelist and short story writer
- January 30 – Michael Dorris, American writer (died 1997)
- February 12 – David Small, American author and illustrator
- February 13 - William Sleator, American science-fiction writer (died 2011)
- February 23 – Robert Gray, Australian poet and critic (died 2025)
- February 25 – Shiva Naipaul, Trinidad-born novelist (died 1985)
- March 19 – Jim Turner, American literary editor (died 1999)
- April 2 – Anne Waldman, American poet
- April 16 – Sebastian Barker, English poet and journalist (died 2014)
- April 27 – August Wilson, American playwright (died 2005)
- April 30 – Annie Dillard, American poet and prose writer
- June 11 – Robert Munsch, American-Canadian author and academic
- June 13 – Whitley Strieber, American horror novelist
- June 21 – Adam Zagajewski, Polish poet, novelist and essayist
- July 5 – Michael Blake, American novelist and screenwriter (died 2015)
- July 9 – Dean Koontz, American novelist
- July 12 – Remy Sylado (Yapi Panda Abdiel Tambayong), Indonesian writer
- July 21 – Wendy Cope, English poet
- July 25 – Joseph Delaney, English fantasy and children's fiction author (died 2022)
- July 26 – M. John Harrison, English fantasy and science fiction author
- July 30 – Patrick Modiano, French novelist, Nobel laureate
- September 1 – Mustafa Balel, Turkish author and translator
- October 15 – John Murrell, American-born dramatist
- November 5 – Richard Holmes, English literary biographer
- November 24 – Nuruddin Farah, Somali novelist
- December 17 – Jacqueline Wilson, English children's writer
- December 21 – Raymond E. Feist, American fantasy writer
- unknown dates
  - Esther Croft, French Canadian novelist and short-story writer
  - Rabai al-Madhoun, Palestinian writer
  - Mari Strachan, Welsh novelist
  - Mohamed Zafzaf, Moroccan novelist (died 2001)

== Deaths ==
- January 13 – Margaret Deland, American novelist (born 1857)
- January 15

- Ursula Bethell, English-born New Zealand poet (born 1874)
- Kate Simpson Hayes, Canadian playwright and legislative librarian (born 1856)

- January 22 – Else Lasker-Schüler, German-born Jewish poet (born 1869)
- January 27 – Antal Szerb, Hungarian writer (in concentration camp, born 1901)
- February 6 – Robert Brasillach, French writer (executed, born 1909)
- February 23 – Aleksey Nikolayevich Tolstoy, Russian writer (born 1883)
- c. March 12 – Anne Frank, German-born Dutch child diarist (probable typhus in concentration camp, born 1929)
- March 15 – Pierre Drieu La Rochelle, French novelist (suicide, born 1893)
- March 20 – Lord Alfred Douglas, English poet (born 1870)
- March 31 – Maurice Donnay, French dramatist (born 1859)
- April – Josef Čapek, Czech artist and writer (in concentration camp, born 1887)
- April 9 – Dietrich Bonhoeffer, German theologian (hanged in concentration camp, born 1906)
- May 2 – Friedo Lampe, German writer (shot, born 1899)
- May 15 – Charles Williams, English author (born 1886)
- May 29 – Mihail Sebastian, Romanian Jewish playwright, essayist and novelist (road accident, born 1907)
- June 5 – Ilie Bărbulescu, Romanian linguist and journalist (born 1873)
- June 8 – Robert Desnos, French poet (in concentration camp, born 1900)
- June 11 – Lurana W. Sheldon, American author and newspaper editor (born 1862)
- July 13 – Alla Nazimova, Crimean-born American scriptwriter and actress (born 1879)
- July 25 – Charles Gilman Norris, American novelist (born 1881)
- August 18 – E. R. Eddison, English fantasy writer (born 1882)
- August 20 – Alexander Roda Roda, Austro-Croatian-born novelist (born 1872)
- August 26 – Franz Werfel, Bohemian-born writer (born 1890)
- September 9 – Zinaida Gippius, émigré Russian writer (born 1869)
- September 21 – Ioan C. Filitti, Romanian historian, political theorist and essayist (born 1879)
- September 22 – Thomas Burke, English novelist and story writer (born 1886)
- October 8 – Felix Salten, Austrian-born children's writer (born 1869)
- November 21 – Robert Benchley, American humorist (born 1889)
- December 4 – Arthur Morrison, English writer (born 1863)
- December 14 - Maurice Baring, English poet and writer (born 1874)
- December 28 – Theodore Dreiser, American author (born 1871)

== Awards ==
- James Tait Black Memorial Prize:
  - Fiction: L. A. G. Strong, Travellers
  - Biography: D. S. MacColl, Philip Wilson Steer
- Newbery Medal for children's literature: Robert Lawson, Rabbit Hill
- Nobel Prize in Literature: Gabriela Mistral
- Premio Nadal: José Félix Tapia, La luna ha entrado en casa
- Prix Goncourt: Jean-Louis Bory, Mon village à l'heure allemande
- Pulitzer Prize:
  - Drama: Mary Chase, Harvey
  - Poetry: Karl Shapiro, V-Letter and Other Poems
  - Novel: John Hersey, A Bell for Adano
- Hugo Award:
  - Best Novella: Theodore Sturgeon, Killdozer!
