= List of Azerbaijani women writers =

This is a list of women writers who were born in Azerbaijan or whose writings are closely associated with that country.

== A ==
- Dilara Aliyeva (1929–1991), philologist, translator, women's rights activist
- Sakina Akhundzadeh (1865–1927), Azerbaijan's first woman playwright, novelist
- Sara Ashurbeyli (1906–2001), historian, orientalist, non-fiction historical works
- Hanimana Alibeyli (1920–2007), Azerbaijani poet-playwright, children's writer

== B ==
- Alaviyya Babayeva (1921–2014), children's writer, novelist, short story writer, translator
- Banine, pen name of Umm-El-Banine Assadoulaeff (1905–1992), Azerbaijani-French novelist, non-fiction writer, author of Caucasian days

== D ==
- Mirvarid Dilbazi (1912–2001), acclaimed poet, children's writer, translator

== G ==
- Madina Gulgun (1926–1991), Iranian-Azerbaijani poet, journalist

== H ==
- Lala Hasanova (born 1978), science fiction novelist, short story writer

== J ==
- Aziza Jafarzadeh (1921–2003), philologist, novelist, biographer, short story writer
- Aghabeyim agha Javanshir (1780–1832), pen name Aghabaji, poet
- Hamida Javanshir (1873–1955), writer, feminist, educator

== K ==
- Heyran Khanim (1790–1848), poet
- Nermin Kamal (1981), poet, short story writer and essayist

== M ==
- Nushaba Mammadli (born 1953), writer, publicist
- Afag Masud (born 1957), novelist, short story writer, playwright, essayist, translator, magazine editor
- Parikhanim Mikayilgizi (born 1953), poet, short story writer, non-fiction writer, editor

== N ==
- Khurshidbanu Natavan (1832–1897), acclaimed poet, many poems now used as folksongs
- Sevinj Nurugizi (born 1964), children's writer, playwright, columnist, translator, textbook writer

== P ==
- Ganira Pashayeva (1975–2023), politician, journalist, news editor-in-chief

== R ==
- Nigar Rafibeyli (1913–1981), poet, novelist, translator

== Y ==
- Gullu Yologlu (born 1963), non-fiction writer, ethnologist

== See also ==
- List of Azerbaijani writers
- List of women writers
