= Seweryna Szmaglewska =

Polish educator

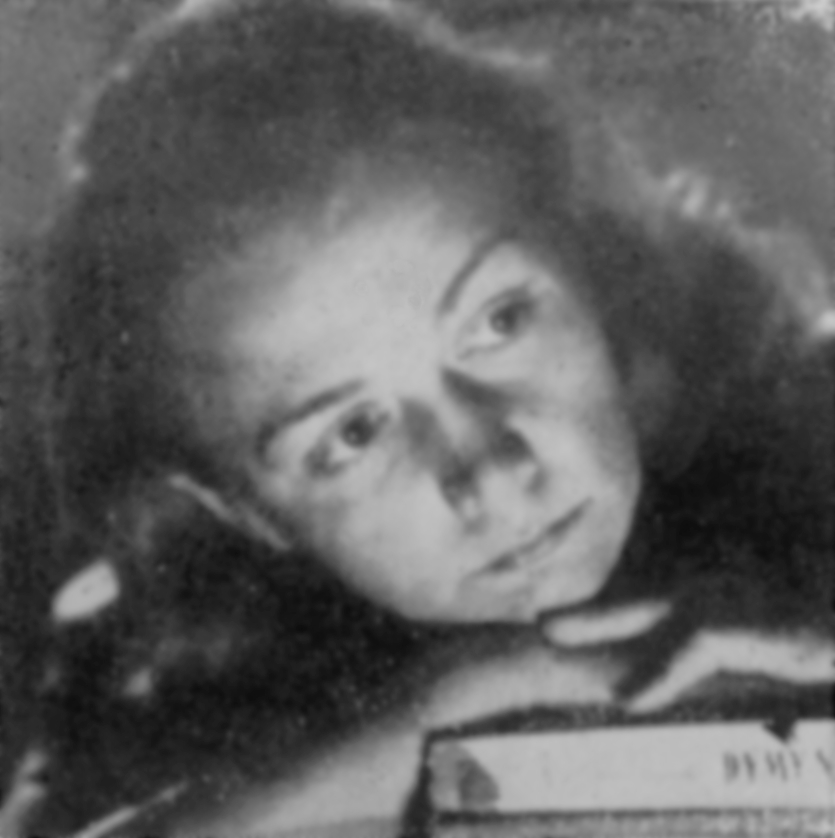
- Szmaglewska as seen on the cover of her 1967 novel "Szum wiatru"
- Born: Seweryna Maria Szmaglewska; 11 February 1916; Przygłów, Congress Poland, Russian Empire
- Died: 7 July 1992 (aged 76); Warsaw, Poland
- Resting place: Bródno Cemetery
- Other name: Seweryna Maria Szmaglewska-Wiśniewska
- Occupations: writer and children's author
- Spouse: Witold Wiśniewski (m. 1946)
- Children: 2

Seweryna Maria Szmaglewska (Seweryna Maria Szmaglewska-Wiśniewska) (11 February 1916 – 7 July 1992) was a Polish writer, known for both books for children and adults alike, and an inmate of the Auschwitz-Birkenau concentration camp during World War II. Her novels Czarne Stopy (Black Feet) and Dymy nad Birkenau (Smoke over Birkenau) are compulsory reading in Polish schools.

== Biography ==
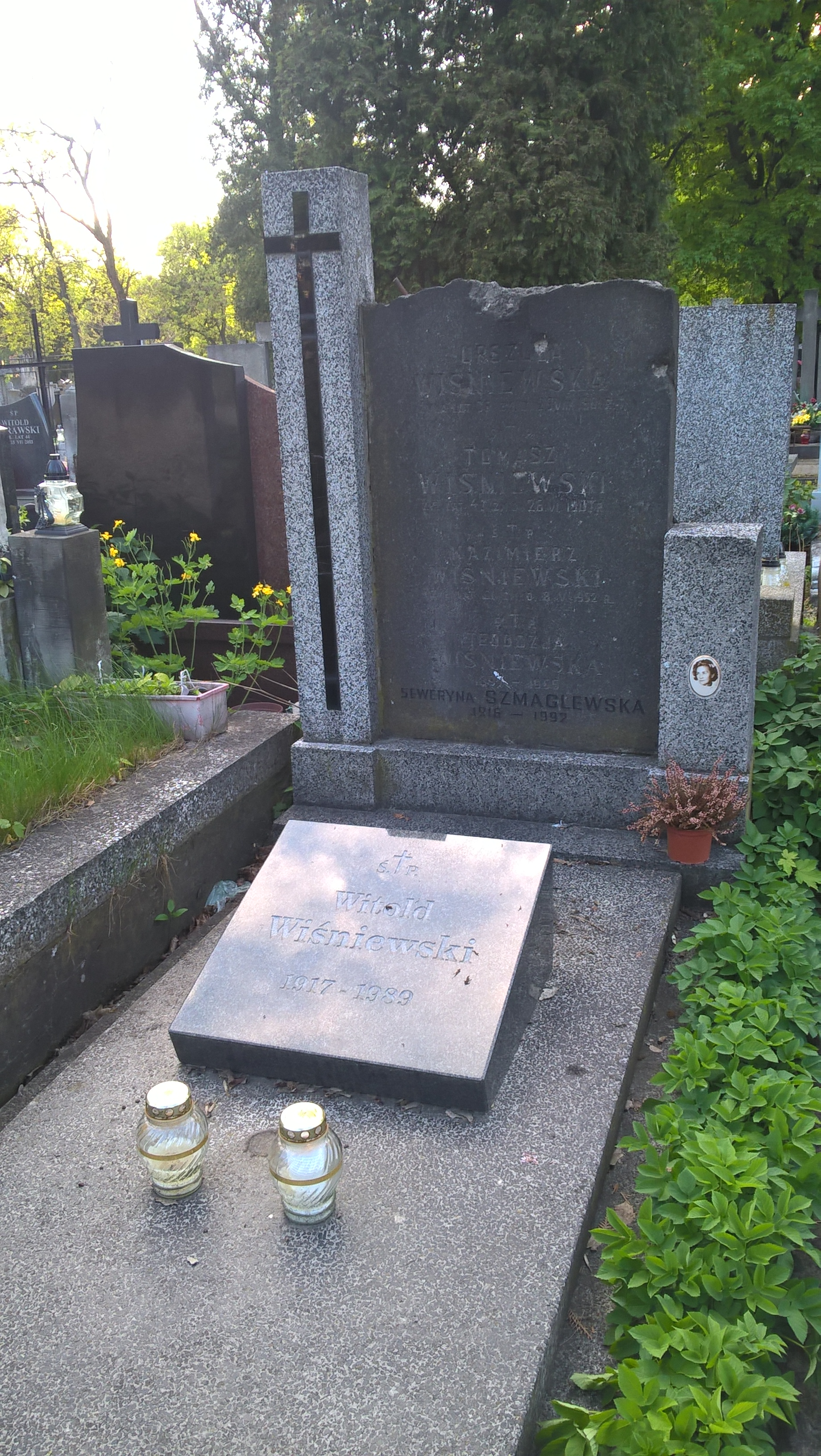
Szmaglewska's grave in Bródno Cemetery

Szmaglewska was born on 11 February 1916, in Przygłów near Piotrków Trybunalski, then in Central Powers-occupied part of the Kingdom of Poland. She graduated from the Free Polish University and went on to study at the Polish language and literature faculties of the Jagiellonian University of Kraków and the University of Łódź.

Between 1942 and 1945 Szmaglewska was an inmate of the Auschwitz-Birkenau concentration camp in Oświęcim, after spending two months in the prisons of Piotrków and Częstochowa. In 1945 she successfully escaped the Nazis during a death march to Gross-Rosen. As a Nazi camp survivor, Szmaglewska was one of two Poles to testify at the Nuremberg Trials on 27 February 1946 (the other witness being Samuel Rajzman). Her testimony concerned the abuse of children in Auschwitz.

After the war Szmaglewska went on to be a successful writer. Initially focusing on her war-time experiences (Dymy nad Birkenau (Smoke over Birkenau), Łączy nas gniew, Niewinni w Norymberdze), with time she also started publishing novels for teenagers. Her best-known novel Czarne Stopy (Black Feet; published in 1960), about Polish boyscouts, was later turned into a 1986 film of the same title (premiered in 1987) by Waldemar Podgórski. In 1973 the continuation of the novel, Nowy ślad Czarnych Stóp (A New Trail of Black Feet), was published. Her novels Czarne Stopy and Dymy nad Birkenau are compulsory reading in Polish schools Her 1972 novel Niewinni w Norymberdze (The Innocents at Nuremberg) recounted her experiences at the Nuremberg Trial.

Szmaglewska's books have been translated into a number of languages, including English and French.

In 1946, Szmaglewska married Witold Wiśniewski, whom she met earlier in Oświęcim. They had two sons: Witold and Jack. Seweryna Szmaglewska died on 7 July 1992, in Warsaw and was interred in Bródno Cemetery.

== Awards and decorations ==
Her awards include:

- Złoty Krzyż Zasługi (1953),
- Krzyż Komandorski Orderu Odrodzenia Polski (1960),
- 1st class award of the Minister of Culture and Arts for the entire literary work, including in particular „Dymy nad Birkenau” and „Niewinni w Norymberdze” (1973),
- Order Sztandaru Pracy I klasy (1978).
- a special award of the Kwatera Główna of the ZHP for the novel „Nowy ślad Czarnych Stóp” (1979)
