= Theo Hupfauer =

German government official (1906-1993)

Reich Minister for Labour
- In office 30 April 1945 – 5 May 1945
- President: Karl Dönitz
- Chancellor: Joseph Goebbels
- Preceded by: Franz Seldte
- Succeeded by: Franz Seldte

Personal details
- Born: 17 July 1906 Dellmensingen, Kingdom of Württemberg, German Empire
- Died: 31 August 1993 (aged 87) Munich, Bavaria, Germany
- Party: Nazi Party (1930-1945)
- Education: University of Würzburg
- Military career
- Allegiance: Nazi Germany
- Branch: Reichsführer-SS
- Service years: 1941–1945
- Rank: SS-Sturmbannführer (major)

Theo Hupfauer (17 July 1906 – 31 August 1993) was a German politician and a senior civil servant of the Nazi Party. In accordance to the Adolf Hitler’s will, he was appointed the Reich Minister for Labour, although this only lasted five days when Franz Seldte again took over.

== Early life ==
Hupfauer was born on 17 July 1906 in Dellmensingen, which was then part of the German Empire. In 1920, at 15 years old, he joined a right-wing youth group led by Adolf von Trotha. He originally wanted to become a sports journalist, but switched to wanting to become a lawyer after his uncle, who was a lawyer in the United States, returned to Munich. Thus, he started attending League of Nations meetings, listening to speeches by Gustav Stresemann and Aristide Briand and inspired to move temporarily to the United States to work as a lawyer. He then studied law in Geneva and Lausanne in Switzerland, receiving his doctorate in 1932 from the University of Würzburg.

== Nazi career ==
He joined the Nazi Party in 1930. In 1935 he was staff chairman in the Main Office of the National Socialist Factory Cell Organization, a workers organization. In 1936 he became of the Office of the German Labour Front. He rose through the ranks in the DAF, becoming Head of the Office for Social Arbitration. During this time, he ran for a seat in the Reichstag, but did not receive a mandate. In 1942, he was appointed DAF's liaison to the Ministry of Armaments. As liaison, he represented the DAF in trying to get the removal of air-raid damage, working with Albert Speer.

In addition to his career as a civil servant during this time, he joined the military. He reached the rank of Sturmbannführer in the Reichsführer-SS. He was the commander at Ordensburg Sonthofen until 1943.

By December 1944 he was head of the Central Office of the Ministry of Armaments. On 29 April 1945, Adolf Hitler signed his will, which came into effect the next day when he committed suicide making Hupfauer the Reich Minister for Labour. On 5 May Franz Seldte took over again in the Flensburg Government, the last Nazi government. After the war, he was interned at Kransberg Castle alongside many other Speer associates.

== Witness at the Nuremberg trials ==
Hupfauer played an important role in the Nuremberg trials as a defense witness. He was extensively interrogated in July 1946, when Albert Speer was on trial, about his role in DAF and the Ministry of Armaments. He stated that membership in the DAF was not forced, but it was recommended since it took over the role of trade unions. He also testified when asked by Robert Servatius about how the DAF functioned, including how many of the DAF were politically active leaders. Later on, when prompted about knowledge of the atrocities committed by the SS, he said that some details were known but that this was "decisively suppressed" until after the trials.

== Later life ==
Throughout Hupfauer's later years, he remained a close friend to Albert Speer. After the war, when Speer and Rudolf Wolters friendship had deteriorated after his letter in November 1966, Hupfauer arranged meetings every Friday evening with other associates of Speer's in order to "build bridges".
