= The Surgeon's Knife =

1957 British film by Gordon Parry

- Directed by: Gordon Parry
- Written by: Robert Westerby
- Based on: The Wicked Flee by Anne Hocking
- Produced by: Charles Leeds; Steven Pallos
- Starring: Donald Houston; Adrienne Corri; Lyndon Brook
- Cinematography: Lionel Banes
- Edited by: Jim Connock
- Music by: Bruce Montgomery
- Production company: Gibraltar Films
- Distributed by: Grand National Pictures (UK); Distributors Corporation of America (US)
- Release date: October 1957
- Running time: 84 minutes
- Country: United Kingdom
- Language: English

The Surgeon's Knife is a 1957 British crime film directed by Gordon Parry and starring Donald Houston, Adrienne Corri and Lyndon Brook. It was written by Robert Westerby, adapted from 1940 novel The Wicked Flee by Anne Hocking.

== Synopsis ==
When his patient dies during an operation, a surgeon resorts to murder to cover up his negligence.

== Cast ==
- Donald Houston as Doctor Alex Waring
- Adrienne Corri as Laura Shelton
- Lyndon Brook as Doctor Ian Breck
- Jean Cadell as Henrietta Stevens
- Sydney Tafler as Doctor Hearne
- Mervyn Johns as Mr. Waring
- Marie Ney as Matron Fiske
- Ronald Adam as Major Tilling
- John Welsh as Inspector Austen
- Beatrice Varley as Mrs. Waring
- Noel Hood as Sister Slater
- André van Gyseghem as Mr. Dodds
- Frank Forsyth as anaesthetist
- Tom Bowman as surgeon
- Susan Westerby as Miss Jenner
- Betty Shale as Garsten

== Production ==
Filming started 18 March 1957 and took eight weeks.

== Critical reception ==
Picturegoer wrote: "Its sensational story is unlikely to be serialized in The Lancet, but Donald Houston and supporting cast make it appear quite exciting throughout for the screen."

TV Guide rated the film 2/5 stars, noting a "Standard melodrama without enough suspense to be terrifying."
