= Nile Green (novel) =

1943 novel

- Author: Anne Hocking
- Language: English
- Series: Chief Inspector William Austen
- Genre: Mystery crime
- Publisher: Geoffrey Bles
- Publication date: 1943
- Publication place: United Kingdom
- Media type: Print
- Preceded by: One Shall Be Taken
- Followed by: Six Green Bottles

Nile Green is a 1943 mystery detective novel by the British writer Anne Hocking. Written during the Golden Age of Detective Fiction, it is the fifth in her long-running series featuring Chief Superintendent William Austen of Scotland Yard. It was published in the United States by Doubleday under the alternative title Death Loves a Shining Mark.

== Synopsis ==
In wartime Cairo working for military intelligence, Austen investigates a case amongst the wealthy British inhabitants of the city. A married woman who had been having an affair, has been murdered during an air raid.

== Bibliography ==
- Barzun, Jacques & Taylor, Wendell Hertig A Catalogue of Crime. HarperCollins, 1989.
- Hubin, Allen J. 1981-1985 Supplement to Crime Fiction, 1749-1980. Garland Pub., 1988.
- Nehr, Ellen. Doubleday Crime Club Compendium, 1928-1991. Offspring Press, 1992.
- Reilly, John M. Twentieth Century Crime & Mystery Writers. Springer, 2015.
- Spector Simon, Reeva. Spies and Holy Wars: The Middle East in 20th-Century Crime Fiction. University of Texas Press, 2010.
