= Franz Seldte =

Leader of Stahlhelm from 1920 to 1935 (1882–1947)

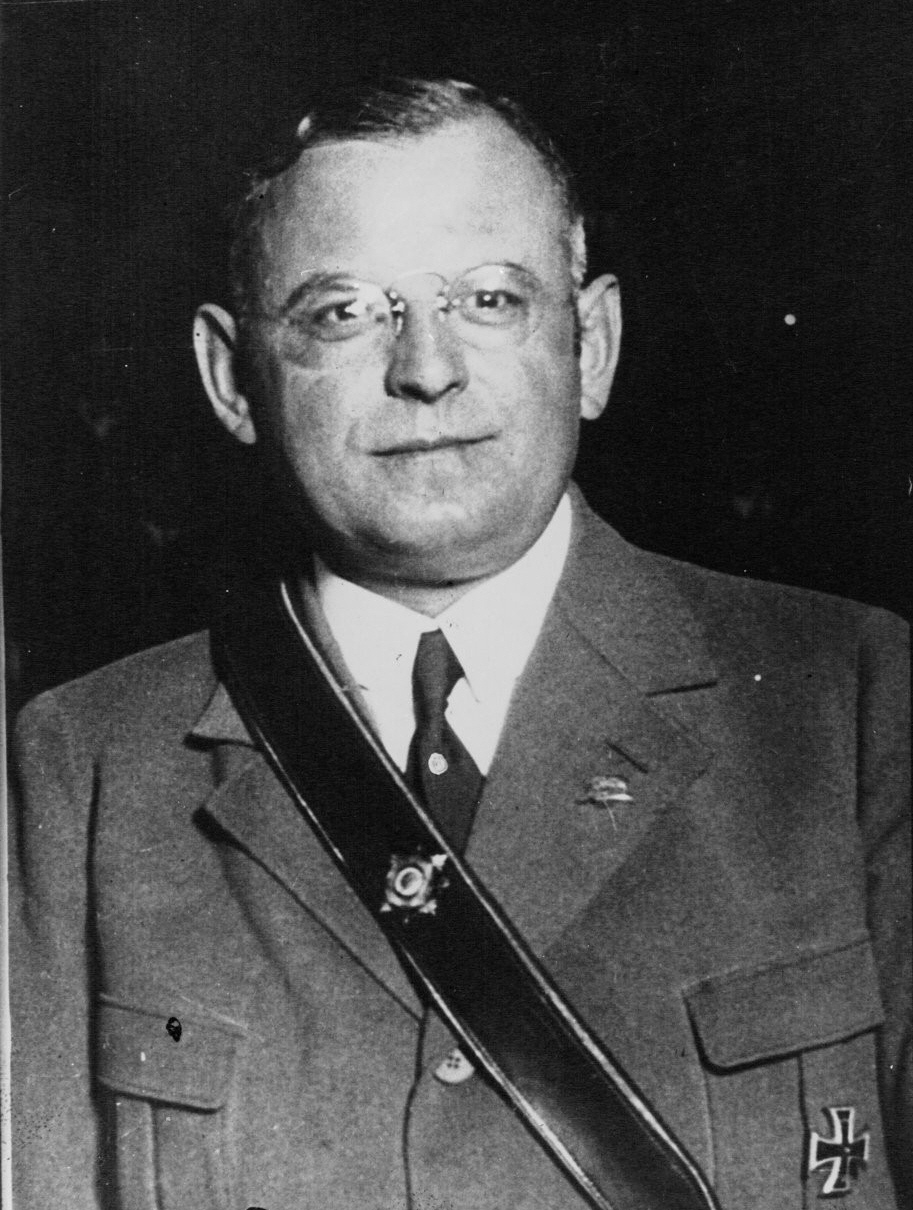
- Seldte in 1933

Reich Minister for Labour
- In office 30 January 1933 – 23 May 1945 (with an interruption from 30 April to 5 May 1945)
- President: Paul von Hindenburg (1933–1934); Adolf Hitler (1934–1945; as Führer); Karl Dönitz (1945)
- Chancellor: Adolf Hitler (1934–1945); Joseph Goebbels (1945); Lutz Graf Schwerin von Krosigk (1945; as Leading Minister)
- Preceded by: Friedrich Syrup
- Succeeded by: Theo Hupfauer (between 30 April and 5 May 1945)

Federal Leader of the Nationalsozialistischer Deutscher frontkämpfer-Bund (Stahlhelm)
- In office 28 March 1934 – 7 November 1935

Federal Leader of Der Stahlhelm
- In office 25 December 1918 – 28 March 1934
- Deputy: Theodor Duesterberg
- Preceded by: Position established
- Succeeded by: Position abolished

Additional positions
- 1933–1945: Member of the Greater German Reichstag
- 1933: Member of the Reichstag

Personal details
- Born: 29 June 1882 Magdeburg, Province of Saxony, Kingdom of Prussia, German Empire
- Died: 1 April 1947 (aged 64) Fürth, Bavaria, Allied-occupied Germany
- Resting place: St Laurentius Cemetery, Rottach-Egern, Germany
- Party: NSDAP (1933–1945)
- Other political affiliations: DVP (until 1927); DNVP (until 1933)
- Education: Brunswick University of Technology

Military service
- Allegiance: German Empire
- Branch/service: Imperial German Army
- Years of service: 1914–1918
- Rank: Hauptmann der Reserve
- Unit: 66th Infantry Regiment
- Battles/wars: World War I: Battle of the Somme (WIA)
- Awards: Iron Cross First Class; Iron Cross Second Class; Wound Badge

Tobias Wilhelm Franz Seldte (29 June 1882 – 1 April 1947) was a German reactionary politician who served as the Reich Minister for Labour in Nazi Germany. Prior to his ministry, Seldte was a founding leader of Der Stahlhelm World War I ex-servicemen's organisation from 1918 to 1934.

== Early life and education ==
Born in Magdeburg in the Prussian province of Saxony, Seldte was the son of an owner of a factory producing chemical products and soda water. He attended the Wilhelm-Raabe-Gymnasium in Magdeburg and, after an apprenticeship as a salesman, studied chemistry at the universities of Braunschweig and Greifswald. In 1908 he took over the business of his early deceased father. As an officer of the German Army he was wounded in World War I and lost his left arm. He then became a front reporter. Awarded with the Iron Cross 2nd and 1st class, Seldte also was promoted to the rank of Hauptmann der Reserve in the 66th Infantry Regiment.

== Der Stahlhelm ==
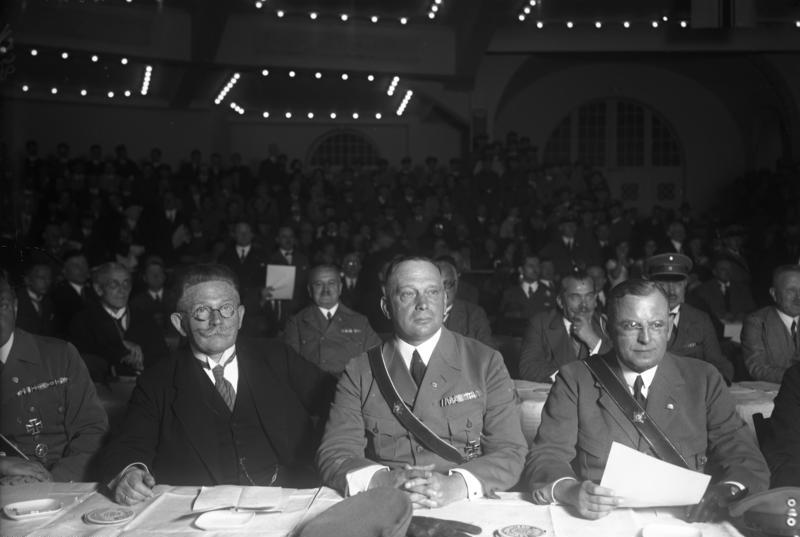
Seldte (r.) with Hugenberg and the Berlin Stahlhelm leader von Stephani at a rally against the Young-Plan, Berlin Sportpalast, 1929

As a reaction to the German Revolution of 1918–1919, Seldte founded Der Stahlhelm, Bund der Frontsoldaten on 25 December 1918, agitating against the Treaty of Versailles and German war reparations. According to Seldte, the organization was to use the spirit of the Frontsoldaten against the 'swinish revolution' taking place in Germany under the Weimar government. While he took charge of Der Stahlhelm from 1923 onwards, he had to cope with the constant rivalry of his deputy leader, the militant Theodor Duesterberg.

Seldte became a member of the national conservative German National People's Party (DNVP) and was a member of the Magdeburg city council (Stadtrat). During the later years of the Weimar Republic Der Stahlhelm became increasingly anti-democratic and anti-republican. However, Seldte hoped that the organization could become a leading organ of a united right-wing movement. In 1929 it united its forces with the DNVP under Alfred Hugenberg, the Pan-German League and the Nazi Party to initiate a German referendum against the Young Plan on World War I reparations. The common goal was to denounce the Chancellor Hermann Müller and his ministers as traitors to their country, nevertheless the plebiscite failed to reach the quorum. In 1931 Seldte helped create the short-lived Harzburg Front, a right-wing alliance against the government of Müller's successor Heinrich Brüning.

== Minister for Labour ==
During the negotiations for the Chancellorship of Germany between Franz von Papen and Hitler in mid-January 1933, Seldte threw his vote and Der Stahlhelm behind Hitler, after which Papen acquiesced to Hitler's demands. On the day of the Machtergreifung on 30 January 1933, Seldte joined the Hitler Cabinet as Reich Minister for Labour, once again outdoing his long-time rival Duesterberg. In the run-up to the elections of March 1933, Der Stahlhelm together with Hugenberg's national conservative German National People's Party (DNVP) attempted to make the Kampffront Schwarz-Weiß-Rot ("Black White Red Combat Front") into the dominant political camp on the right, but ultimately failed as it only gained 8.0% of the votes cast. Nevertheless, Seldte obtained a seat in the Reichstag as a DNVP "guest". Returned in subsequent elections as a Nazi Party deputy, he would remain in the Reichstag until the end of the Nazi regime.

On 27 April 1933 Seldte finally joined the Nazi Party and merged Der Stahlhelm into Ernst Röhm's Sturmabteilung (SA) militia – de facto placing it at the disposal of Hitler. In August 1933, he was awarded the rank of SA-Obergruppenführer and later was appointed Reichskommissar for the Freiwilliger Arbeitsdienst employment program, but was soon superseded by his state secretary Konstantin Hierl as leader of the Reichsarbeitsdienst organization. Seldte also was made a member of the Academy for German Law. In March 1934 Seldte was made the federal leader of the Nationalsozialistischer Deutscher frontkämpfer-Bund (Stahlhelm) (English: National Socialist German Combatants' Federation (Stahlhelm)) (NSDFBSt), a successor organization of Der Stahlhelm, which however was disbanded in November 1935. Seldte was also a member of the Prussian state government as Prussian Labour Minister from 1 April 1935, in the cabinet of Minister President Hermann Göring. With this appointment, Seldte became an ex officio member of the Prussian State Council.

In 1935 Seldte requested to be released from official responsibilities, but Hitler refused. Throughout his tenure as chief of the Labor Ministry, Seldte never enjoyed the full support of Hitler, who did not think he was worth much. As a result, members of the Nazi hierarchy began encroaching on his areas of responsibility and Seldte was marginalized accordingly. For instance, Hermann Goering's Four Year Plan which he began to implement in late 1936, ran roughshod over Seldte's Labor Ministry altogether. Seldte, without substantial power, remained Reich and Prussian Minister for Labour until the end of World War II. Even after Hitler's suicide and the nomination of Grand Admiral Dönitz as his successor, Seldte kept his post, being named Labour Minister in the Flensburg government.

As Reich Minister for Labour, Franz Seldte was one of the signatories of the Work Order Act (Gesetz zur Ordnung der nationalen Arbeit) from 1934, which introduced the Führer principle (Führerprinzip) in factories and significantly restricted the rights of employees.

== Death ==
Seldte was captured at the end of the war and imprisoned in Camp Ashcan in Mondorf-les-Bains. During the Nuremberg trials, Seldte tried to exonerate himself by claiming that he had stood against the dictatorship of Hitler and that he advocated for a two-chamber system of parliamentary governance. His story was not convincing. Seldte died in a US military hospital in April 1947 at Fürth, before the Nuremberg Tribunal had the chance to formally try him on the charges.

== Legacy ==
In Nazi-era Germany, streets were named after him in several German cities, among them his hometown Magdeburg and Leverkusen. In Forst (Lausitz), the football stadium at the water tower was named Franz-Seldte-Kampfbahn. In Oberhausen, the square behind the main railway station was named after him.

== Bibliography ==
- Bracher, Karl D. The German Dictatorship: The Origins, Structure, and Effects of National Socialism. New York: Praeger Publishers, 1970.
- Evans, Richard J. The Third Reich in Power. New York: Penguin, 2006.
- Fischer, Klaus. Nazi Germany: A New History. New York: Continuum, 1995.
- Kershaw, Ian. Hitler: 1889-1936, Hubris. New York: W. W. Norton & Company, 2000.
- Klee, Ernst. Das Personenlexikon zum Dritten Reich. Wer war was vor und nach 1945. Frankfurt-am-Main: Fischer-Taschenbuch-Verlag, 2007.
- Lilla, Joachim (2005). Der Preußische Staatsrat 1921–1933: Ein biographisches Handbuch. Düsseldorf: Droste Verlag. ISBN 978-3-770-05271-4.
- Longerich, Peter. Heinrich Himmler. Oxford and New York: Oxford University Press, 2012.
- Mazower, Mark. Hitler's Empire: How the Nazis Ruled Europe. New York: Penguin, 2009.
- Shirer, William L. The Rise and Fall of the Third Reich. New York: MJF Books, 1990, [1959].
- Snyder, Louis L. Encyclopedia of the Third Reich. London: Robert Hale, 1976
- Stackelberg, Roderick. The Routledge Companion to Nazi Germany. New York: Routledge, 2007.
- Taylor, James, and Warren Shaw. Dictionary of the Third Reich. New York: Penguin, 2002.
- Wistrich, Robert S. Who's Who in Nazi Germany. New York: Routledge, 2001.
- Zentner, Christian; Bedürftig, Friedemann, eds. (1997) [1991]. The Encyclopedia of the Third Reich. New York: Da Capo Press. ISBN 978-0-306-80793-0.
