= Number Seven, Queer Street =

- First edition
- Author: Margery Lawrence
- Cover artist: Cecil W Bacon
- Language: English
- Genre: Supernatural, detective fiction
- Publisher: Robert Hale
- Publication date: 1945
- Publication place: United Kingdom
- Media type: Print (hardback)
- Pages: 350 pp

Number Seven, Queer Street is a collection of supernatural detective short stories by author Margery Lawrence. It was first published by Robert Hale in the United Kingdom in 1945. The first United States edition was published in 1969 by Mycroft & Moran in an edition of 2,027 copies and omits the last two stories. The stories are about Lawrence's supernatural detective Miles Pennoyer.

== Contents ==
Number Seven, Queer Street contains the following tales:

1. "Foreword"
2. "The Case of the Bronze Door"
3. "The Case of the Haunted Cathedral"
4. "The Case of Ella McLeod"
5. "The Case of the White Snake"
6. "The Case of the Moonchild"
7. "The Case of the Young Man with the Scar"
8. "The Case of the Leannabh Sidhe"
