= Mediterranean Murder =

1951 novel

- Author: Anne Hocking
- Language: English
- Series: Chief Inspector William Austen
- Genre: Detective
- Publisher: Evans
- Publication date: 1951
- Publication place: United Kingdom
- Media type: Print
- Preceded by: Death Disturbs Mr. Jefferson
- Followed by: There's Death in the Cup

Mediterranean Murder is a 1951 mystery detective novel by the British writer Anne Hocking. Written during the Golden Age of Detective Fiction, it was the twelfth entry in her series featuring Chief Inspector William Austen of Scotland Yard. It was published in the United States by Doubleday under the alternative title Killing Kin.

== Synopsis ==
While on holiday in Blanes on the coast of Spain, Austen assists the investigation into the murder of wealthy Mrs Bentham, a British holidaymaker killed shortly after her arrival. Her son Donald is an obvious suspect, as he will now inherit her fortune, but he fears for his own life from his various cousins who will receive the money if he is now killed.

== Bibliography ==
- Hubin, Allen J. 1981-1985 Supplement to Crime Fiction, 1749-1980. Garland Pub., 1988.
- Nehr, Ellen. Doubleday Crime Club Compendium, 1928-1991. Offspring Press, 1992.
- Reilly, John M. Twentieth Century Crime & Mystery Writers. Springer, 2015.
