= One Shall Be Taken =

1942 novel

- Author: Anne Hocking
- Language: English
- Series: Chief Inspector William Austen
- Genre: Detective
- Publisher: Geoffrey Bles
- Publication date: 1942
- Publication place: United Kingdom
- Media type: Print
- Preceded by: Miss Milverton
- Followed by: Nile Green

One Shall Be Taken is a 1942 detective novel by the British writer Anne Hocking. It was published in London by Geoffrey Bles. Written during the Golden Age of Detective Fiction, it is the fourth entry in her series featuring Chief Superintendent William Austen of Scotland Yard.

== Bibliography ==
- Hubin, Allen J. 1981-1985 Supplement to Crime Fiction, 1749-1980. Garland Pub., 1988.
- Reilly, John M. Twentieth Century Crime & Mystery Writers. Springer, 2015.
