= Prussian Blue (novel) =

1947 novel

- Author: Anne Hocking
- Language: English
- Series: Chief Inspector William Austen
- Genre: Mystery crime
- Publisher: Geoffrey Bles
- Publication date: 1947
- Publication place: United Kingdom
- Media type: Print
- Preceded by: Death at the Wedding
- Followed by: At The Cedars

Prussian Blue is a 1947 mystery crime novel by the British writer Anne Hocking. It was her ninth in the series featuring Chief Superintendent William Austen of Scotland Yard. The title refers to Prussian Blue, a blue pigment used by artists. It was published in the United States by Doubleday under the alternative title The Finishing Touch.

== Synopsis ==
Celebrated British painter Anthony Medway is found dead in his studio on the island of Cyprus. Amongst the chief suspects are his wife, son and mother who all had a strained relationship with him. MacDonald secures leave from military duty in Cairo to travel to Cyprus to assist the local police.

== Bibliography ==
- Hubin, Allen J. 1981-1985 Supplement to Crime Fiction, 1749-1980. Garland Pub., 1988.
- Nehr, Ellen. Doubleday Crime Club Compendium, 1928-1991. Offspring Press, 1992.
- Reilly, John M. Twentieth Century Crime & Mystery Writers. Springer, 2015.
