= List of witnesses to the International Military Tribunal =

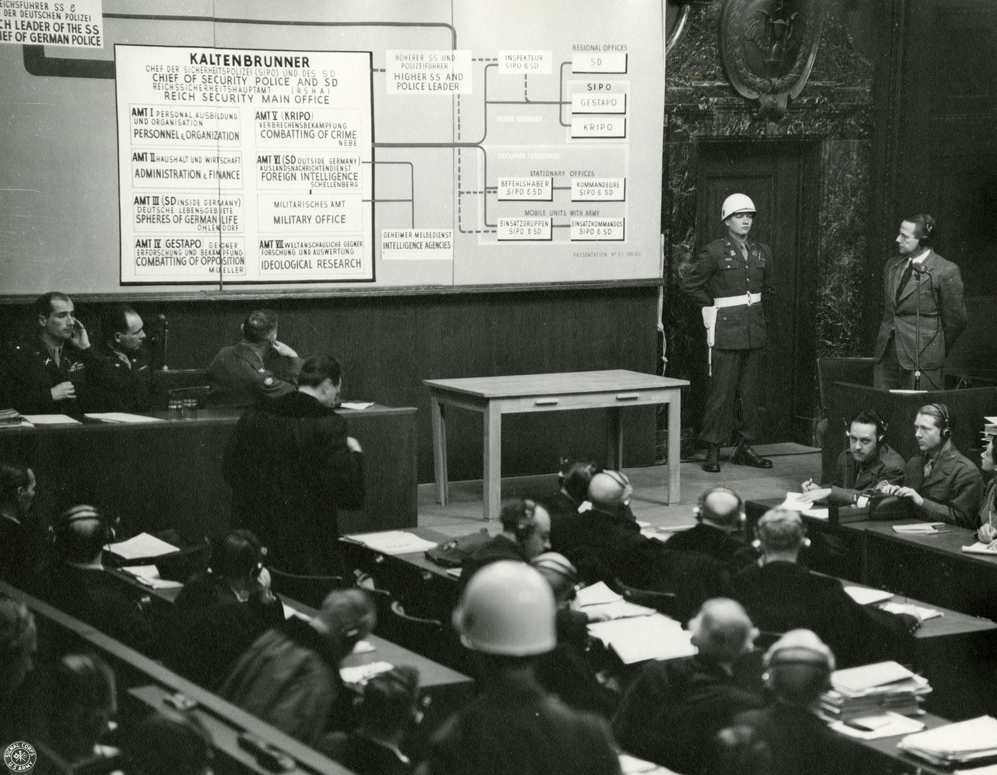
Einsatzgruppen commander Otto Ohlendorf testifies for the American prosecution, 3 January 1946

During the International Military Tribunal, 37 witnesses testified for the prosecution. 80 witnesses testified for the defense, including 19 of the defendants. An additional 143 witnesses gave evidence for the defense by written answers to interrogatories. For the defense of the organizations, 101 witnesses were heard before Commissioners elected by the tribunal and 1809 affidavits from other witnesses were submitted. A further six reports were submitted, summarizing many more affidavits.

== Prosecution witnesses ==
Prosecution witnesses
| Name | Date | Role | Called by | Testified about | Relevant to defendants |
|---|---|---|---|---|---|
| Erwin Lahousen | 30 November | Abwehr general and 20 July plotter | United States | Conspiracy to commit crimes against peace | Ribbentrop, Keitel, and others |
| Otto Ohlendorf | 3 January | Einsatzgruppen commander | United States | The murder of 80,000 people by those under his command | SS, High Command, and the SD |
| Dieter Wisliceny | 3 January | Eichmann's subordinate | United States | | |
| Walter Schellenberg | 4 January | SS intelligence officer | United States | Einsatzgruppen | |
| Alois Hollriege | 4 January | Mauthausen guard | United States | murder of prisoners | von Schirach and Kaltenbrunner |
| Erich von dem Bach-Zelewski | 7 January | SS general | United States | German anti-partisan warfare, related killings of civilians | High Command of the Wehrmacht |
| Franz Blaha | 11 January | Czech doctor and survivor of Dachau concentration camp | United States | Nazi human experimentation | |
| Maurice Lampe | 25 January | French resistance member, survivor of Mauthausen concentration camp | France | | |
| Marie-Claude Vaillant-Couturier | 28 January | French resistance member | France | what she had seen during the three years she spent in Auschwitz concentration camp | |
| Francisco Boix | 28 January | Spanish photographer, survivor of Mauthausen concentration camp | France | Albert Speer's visit to Mauthausen, among other things | Speer |
| Hans Cappelen | 28 January | Norwegian lawyer, concentration camp survivor | France | | |
| Leo van der Essen | 4 February | librarian of the Catholic University of Leuven (Belgium) | France | destruction of the library during both world wars | |
| Friedrich Paulus | 11 February | German field marshal in command at the Battle of Stalingrad | Soviet Union | Crimes against peace | Keitel, Jodl, and Göring were most responsible for the war |
| Erich Buschenhagen | 12 February | German general | Soviet Union | Finland and Germany conspiring to invade the Soviet Union | |
| Joseph Orbeli | 22 February | Soviet Armenian scholar | Soviet Union | siege of Leningrad, damage to Winter Palace | |
| Jacob Grigorev | 26 February | peasant from Pskov (Russia) | Soviet Union | village attacked "for no reason" in October 1943 | |
| Eugene Kivelisha | 26 February | Red Army doctor | Soviet Union | German mistreatment of Soviet prisoners of war | |
| Abraham Sutzkever | 27 February | Yiddish poet from Vilna (Lithuania) | Soviet Union | Vilna Ghetto, Ponary massacre | None |
| Seweryna Szmaglewska | 27 February | Polish Auschwitz survivor | Soviet Union | abuse of children | |
| Samuel Rajzman | 27 February | Treblinka survivor | Soviet Union | Treblinka extermination camp | None |
| Nikolai Lomakin | 27 February | Russian Orthodox metropolitan | Soviet Union | Siege of Leningrad | |

== Defense witnesses ==
- Witnesses gave testimonies for one or more of the seven government organizations and/or one or more of the 24 leaders of Nazi Germany

Defense witnesses for the organizations
| Name | Date | Role | Called by | Testified about | Relevant to defendants |
|---|---|---|---|---|---|
| Adolf Heusinger | | Chief of the Operations Section of the High Command of the Army from 1940 to 1944. | | General Staff and High Command | General Staff and High Command |
| Albert Hoffmann | | Gauleiter of Southern Westphalia 1943-1945 | | Gauleiters (Political Leaders) | Corps of Political Leaders |
| Albert Kesselring | | Commander-in-Chief West (end of war) | | General Staff and High Command | General Staff and High Command |
| Alfred Helmut Naujocks | | Carried out attack on Gleiwitz Broadcasting Station in 1939 | | SD | SD |
| Anton Schueller | | NSV (Welfare) | | Gau and Kreis Staffs and organizations affiliated to the NSDAP | Corps of Political Leaders |
| Bruno Biedermann | | Gaupersonalamtsleiter (personnel) | | Gau and Kreis Staffs and organizations affiliated to the NSDAP | Corps of Political Leaders |
| Dieter Wislicency | | Jewish Committee of the Eichmann Department | | Department of Eichmann | SS |
| Dr. Alfred Hoengen | | Worked in SD concerning law and administration | | SD | SD |
| Dr. Brausse | | Court Martial Officer (SS Judge) | | Waffen-SS | SS |
| Emmerich David | | Vicar of the Diocese of Cologne | | SA didn't eliminate forces via terror, suppress trade unions, spread propaganda, encourage persecution of the Church, nor conspire in plans of aggressive war | SA |
| Ernst Geier | | President of Nuremberg Branch of the State Railways and former Hauptsturmfuehrer | | SA didn't eliminate forces via terror, suppress trade unions, spread propaganda, encourage persecution of the Church, nor conspire in plans of aggressive war | SA |
| Dr. Frinhart Rathcke | | Konsistorialrat of the Evangelical Church | | SA didn't eliminate forces via terror, suppress trade unions, spread propaganda, encourage persecution of the Church, nor conspire in plans of aggressive war | SA |
| Dr. Gottfried Boley | | Ministerialrat in the Reich Chancellery in Berlin | | SA didn't eliminate forces via terror, suppress trade unions, spread propaganda, encourage persecution of the Church, nor conspire in plans of aggressive war | SA |
| Dr. Hans Ehlich | | Chief of Section II B of Amt 3 of RSHA (population and racial questions) | | SD | SD |
| Dr. Hans Roessner | | in Group II C of Amt 3 of RSHA (science, education, religion) | | SD | SD |
| Dr. Heinz Joachim Graf | | Chief of the Interpreting and Interrogation Section | | Waffen-SS | SS |
| Dr. Helmut Knochen | | Chief of SiPo and SD in France 1942-1944 | | SD | SD |
| Dr. Kurt Wolf | | Lawyer | | SA didn't eliminate forces via terror, suppress trade unions, spread propaganda, encourage persecution of the Church, nor conspire in plans of aggressive war | SA |
| Dr. Norbert Pohl | | Senior Assault Unit Leader | | SS Main Offices | SS |
| Dr. Peter Liebrich | | Medical Officer in Allgemeine SS and Waffen-SS | | Waffen-SS | SS |
| Werner Best | | Ministerial Dierector of the Security Police in Reich Ministry of the Interior and Reich Plenipotentiary in Denmark | | Gestapo | Gestapo |
| Eberhard Hinderfeld | | Legal adviser to SS disciplinary court in Munic | | Allgemeine SS | SS |
| Eberhard von Thadden | | Councillor in the German Foreign Office | | Department of Eichmann | SS |
| Eduard Kuehl | | Kreisleiter in Hanover 1943-1945 | | Kreisleiters | Corps of Political Leaders |
| Edward Willy Meyer Wendeborn | | Kreisleiter in Kloppenburg 1934-1945 | | Kreisleiters | Corps of Political Leaders |
| Else Paul | | Reichsfrauenschaft (women) | | Gau and Kreis Staffs and organizations affiliated to the NSDAP | Corps of Political Leaders |
| Eric von Manstein | | Commanded the 11th Army in 1942 | | General Staff and High Command | General Staff and High Command |
| Erna Westernacher | | Frauenschaftsleiterin (women) | | Gau and Kreis Staffs and organizations affiliated to the NSDAP | Corps of Political Leaders |
| Ernst Hirt | | Blockleiter in Nurnberg 1942-1945 | | Block and Zellen Leiters | Corps of Political Leaders |
| Ewald Schleicker | | Kreisleiter in Coblentz 1937-1945 | | Kreisleiters | Corps of Political Leaders |
| Feliz Schieblich | | Volunteer | | Waffen-SS | SS |
| Franz Bock | | SA Obergruppenfuehrer in Düsseldorf | | SA didn't eliminate forces via terror, suppress trade unions, spread propaganda, encourage persecution of the Church, nor conspire in plans of aggressive war | SA |
| Franz Halder | | Chief of the General Staff of the Army | | General Staff and High Command | General Staff and High Command |
| Franz Straub | | Chief of the Security Police and SD in Brussels 1940-1943 | | Gestapo | Gestapo |
| Friedrich Habenicht | | SA Brigade Leader in Wuppertal and President of Police | | SA didn't eliminate forces via terror, suppress trade unions, spread propaganda, encourage persecution of the Church, nor conspire in plans of aggressive war | SA |
| Karl von Eberstein | | Oberabschnittsführer in Dresden and Chief of Police in Bavaria from 1937 to 1945 | | Allgemeine SS | SS |
| Friedrich Klaehn | | Chief of Amt "Schrift" (Publications Department) | | SA didn't eliminate forces via terror, suppress trade unions, spread propaganda, encourage persecution of the Church, nor conspire in plans of aggressive war | SA |
| Gerd von Rundstedt | | Field Marshal of Heer and Wehrmacht | | General Staff and High Command | General Staff and High Command |
| Graf von Roedern | | Auslandsorganisation | | Gau and Kreis Staffs and organizations affiliated to the NSDAP | Corps of Political Leaders |
| Guenther Joel | | Reich Ministry of Justice and attorney general of Westphalia | | Gestapo (closing of unauthorized concentration camps belonging to the SS/SA) and Action Zeppelin | Gestapo |
| Hans Juettner | | SS Senior Group Leader of the Main Headquarters of the Waffen-SS. | | Deaths Heads Units and the SS Verfuegungstruppe | SS |
| Hans Oberlindober | | President of the National Socialist War Veterans Associations (Frontkaemphferbundes). | | SA didn't eliminate forces via terror, suppress trade unions, spread propaganda, encourage persecution of the Church, nor conspire in plans of aggressive war | SA |
| Georg-Hans Reinhardt | | Commanded the Third Panzer Army and Army Group Center until January 1945. | | General Staff and High Command | General Staff and High Command |
| Hans Roettinger | | Chief of the 4th Army of the Central Army Group | | General Staff and High Command | General Staff and High Command |
| Hans Schneider | | Zellenleiter in Augsburg 1936-1942 | | Block and Zellen Leiters | Corps of Political Leaders |
| Hans Tesmer | | Attorney of the Gestapo in Berlin 1936-1945 | | Gestapo (compulsory character of membership and status of administrative personnel) | Gestapo |
| Hans Wegsheider | | Ortsgruppenleiter in Allgau 1933-1945 | | Ortsgruppenleiter | Corps of Political Leaders |
| Heinrich Vitzdmann | | Chief of Police and Gestapo in Konigsberg and Police President | | Gestapo (closing of unauthorized concentration camps belonging to the SS/SA) and Action Zeppelin | Gestapo |
| Helmuth Kluck | | Public Health Officer and Senator in Danzig | | Allgemeine SS | SS |
| Joachim Ruoff | | Colonel in the Main Headquarters of the Waffen-SS | | Waffen-SS | SS |
| Johann Hedel | | Technical Information Bureau of Gestapo in Munich | | Gestapo (compulsory character of membership and status of administrative personnel) | Gestapo |
| Johann Mohr | | Agrarpolitisches Amt (Agriculture) | | Gau and Kreis Staffs and organizations affiliated to the NSDAP | Corps of Political Leaders |
| Johannes Zupke | | Personnel Department of the Order Police | | SS Regiments | SS |
| Karl Chudoba | | Student Organizations | | Gau and Kreis Staffs and organizations affiliated to the NSDAP | Corps of Political Leaders |
| Karl Engelbert | | Kreiswirtschaftsberater (Kreis economic adviser) | | Gau and Kreis Staffs and organizations affiliated to the NSDAP | Corps of Political Leaders |
| Karl Guenther Molk | | Senior Assault Unit Leader of SS (Junker) Training School | | Waffen-SS | SS |
| Karl Hans Joehnk | | Member of the Leibstandarte Adolf Hitler | | Allgemeine SS | SS |
| Karl Heinz Hoffmann | | Chief of Amt IV of the Security Police in Denmark | | Gestapo | Gestapo |
| Karl Otto Kurt Kaufmann | | Gauleiter of Hamburg 1928-1945 | | Gauleiters (Political Leaders) | Corps of Political Leaders |
| Karl Otto von Der Borch | | Provincial Riding Leader in the Ostmark | | NS Reiterkorps (Riding Units) | SA |
| Karl Ullrich | | Commander of the SS Panzer Division Viking | | Waffen-SS | SS |
| Karl Wahl | | Gauleiter in Schwaben (Bavaria) 1928-1945 | | Gauleiters (Political Leaders) | Corps of Political Leaders |
| Siegfried Westphal | | Chief of Staff in Italy from 1943 to 1944 | | General Staff and High Command | General Staff and High Command |
| Franz Schlegelberger | | Under Secretary in the Ministry of Justice | | Cabinet meetings and functions of the Fuehrer | Reich Cabinet |
| Ludwig Grauert | | State Secretary of Prussia | | Allgemeine SS | SS |
| Ludwig Oldach | | Chief of Gestapo in Mecklenburg District 1933-1945 | | Gestapo | Gestapo |
| Martin Hauffe | | Chief of Administration in Sigmaningen, and Landesfuehrer (Provincial Leader) of the Stahlhelm | | Stahlhelm | SA |
| Max Jüttner | | SA Obergruppenfuehrer, Permanent Deputy of the Chief of Staff of the SA. | | SA didn't eliminate forces via terror, suppress trade unions, spread propaganda, encourage persecution of the Church, nor conspire in plans of aggressive war | SA |
| Otto Freiherr von Waldenfels | | Landesfuehrer (Provincial Leader) in Bavaria | | Stahlhelm | SA |
| Otto Somann | | Chief of Security Police in Wiesbaden | | Gestapo (compulsory character of membership and status of administrative personnel) | Gestapo |
| Paul Hausser | | Commanding Army Group G on the Western Front | | Deaths Heads Units, SS Verfuegungstruppe, and the Waffen-SS | SS |
| Paul Koppe | | Office of "Community Policy" (Local Government Affairs) | | Gau and Kreis Staffs and organizations affiliated to the NSDAP | Corps of Political Leaders |
| Paul Wolf | | Zellenleiter in Saarbruecken 1941-1945 | | Block and Zellen Leiters | Corps of Political Leaders |
| Richard Mueller | | Central Administration of the Party (The Treasury) | | Gau and Kreis Staffs and organizations affiliated to the NSDAP | Corps of Political Leaders |
| Richard Walle | | Obertruppfuehrer in Westphalia | | NS Reiterkorps (Riding Units) | SA |
| Ritter von Leeb | | Commander-in-Chief Army Group North on the Russian Front in 1941 | | General Staff and High Command | General Staff and High Command |
| Robert Brill | | Deputy Chief of Recruiting Section of the Waffen-SS Main Office | | Waffen-SS | SS |
| Rolf-Heinz Höppner | | Incharge of Amt 3 A of the RSHA | | SD | SD |
| Rudolf Kuehn | | Blockleiter in Berlin 1935-1945 | | Block and Zellen Leiters | Corps of Political Leaders |
| Ruediger von Woikowski-Biedau | | Inspectorate of Riding in the SS Main Office. | | Riding Units (SS) | SS |
| Theo Gruss | | Paymaster of the Stahlhelm | | Stahlhelm | SA |
| Theo Hupfauer | | DAF (German labor front) | | Gau and Kreis Staffs and organizations affiliated to the NSDAP | Corps of Political Leaders |
| Theodore Busse | | Commanded a Corps in July 1944 and was later appointed to Command the 9th Army. | | General Staff and High Command | General Staff and High Command |
| Theophil Burgstahler | | Clergyman | | SA didn't eliminate forces via terror, suppress trade unions, spread propaganda, encourage persecution of the Church, nor conspire in plans of aggressive war | SA |
| Walter Albath | | Chief of Gestapo in Konigsberg 1941-1943; acting Inspector of Security Police and SD in Wehrkreis I | | Gestapo | Gestapo |
| Walter Blume | | Recruiting Section of the Waffen-SS Main Office | | Waffen-SS | SS |
| Walter Schellenberg | | Chief of Section E of Amt IV of the RSHA | | General Staff and High Command | General Staff and High Command |
| Walter von Brauchitsch | | Commander-in-Chief of the Army until 1941. | | General Staff and High Command | General Staff and High Command |
| Werner Grothmann | | Adjutant to Himmler 1940 to 1945. | | Waffen-SS | SS |
| Werner Schaeffer | | Commandant of Oranienburg 1933-1934 | | SA didn't eliminate forces via terror, suppress trade unions, spread propaganda, encourage persecution of the Church, nor conspire in plans of aggressive war | SA |
| Wilhelm Grunwald | | representative of the Inspector of Security Police and SD in Braunschweig | | Gestapo (their closing of unauthorized concentration camps belonging to the SS and SA) and Action Zeppelin | Gestapo |
| Wilhelm Johann Kirchbaum | | Chief of the Military Police in Obersalzberg 1940-1945 | | Gestapo (compulsory character of membership and status of administrative personnel) | Gestapo |
| Wilhelm List | | Commanded an Army in France, Poland and Greece until 1942 | | General Staff and High Command | General Staff and High Command |
| Wolfram Sievers | | Part of the Ahnenerbe | | SS Main Offices | SS |

Defense witnesses for the individual defendants
| Name | Date | Role | Called by | Testified about | Relevant to defendants |
|---|---|---|---|---|---|
| Hans Bernd Gisevius | 26 April 1946 | German resistance and Abwehr official | Dr. Otto Pannenbecker | State of the police authority in Germany | Wilhelm Frick |
| Rudolf Hess | 31 August 1946 | Deputy Fuhrer | Dr. Kauffmann | Atrocities at Auschwitz and destruction of European Jewry | Kaltenbrunner, Hess |
| Herman Goering | | Founder of Gestapo | | | Herman Goering |
| Ernst Kaltenbrunner | | Senior SS, head of Reich Main Security | | | Ernst Kaltenbrunner |
| Wilhelm Frick | | Minister of Interior, Reich Protector of Moravia and Bohemia | | | Wilhelm Frick |
| Julius Streicher | | Author of "Der Stürmer" and other antisemitic publishings | | | Julius Streicher |
| Franz von Papen | | Vice-Chancellor of Germany | | | Franz von Papen |
| Arthur Seyss-Inquart | | Reich Commissioner for Occupied Netherlands | | | Arthur Seyss |
| Wilhelm Keitel | | Chief of Armed Forces High Command | | | Wilhelm Keitel |
| Hjalmar Schacht | | Economist, President of Reichsbank | | | Hjalmar Schacht |
| Alfred Jodl | | Chief of Operations of Armed Forces High Command | | | Alfred Jodl |
| Albert Speer | | Minister of Armaments and War Production | | | Albert Speer |
| Karl Doenitz | | Commander of Navy, Hitler's successor | | | Karl Doenitz |
| Hans Frank | | Governor-General of occupied Poland | | | Hans Frank |
| Walther Funk | | Minister of Economics, President of Reichsbank | | | Walther Funk |
| Konstantin von Neurath | | Foreign Minister, Protector of Morovia and Bohemia | ` | | Konstantin von Neurath |
| Erich Raeder | | Grand Admiral, Commander in Chief of Navy | | | Erich Raeder |
| Joachim von Ribbentrop | | Foreign Minister of Nazi Germany | | | Joachim von Ribbentrop |
| Fritz Sauckel | | Plenipotenkary General of Utilization of Labour | | | Fritz Sauckel |
| Baldur von Schirach | | Youth Leader of Nazi Party | | | Baldur von Schirach |

== Works cited ==
- Douglas, Lawrence (2001). The Memory of Judgment: Making Law and History in the Trials of the Holocaust. Yale University Press. ISBN 978-0-300-10984-9.
- Hirsch, Francine (2020). Soviet Judgment at Nuremberg: A New History of the International Military Tribunal after World War II. Oxford University Press. ISBN 978-0-19-937795-4.
- Pike, David Wingeate (2003). Spaniards in the Holocaust: Mauthausen, Horror on the Danube. Routledge. ISBN 978-1-134-58713-1.
- Priemel, Kim Christian (2016). The Betrayal: The Nuremberg Trials and German Divergence. Oxford University Press. ISBN 978-0-19-256374-3.
- Neave, Airey (1946). Colonel Neave Report: Final Report on the Evidence of Witnesses for the Defense of Organizations Alleged to be Criminal, Nuremberg Trial Proceedings Volume 42
- Tusa, Ann; Tusa, John (2010) [1983]. The Nuremberg Trial. Skyhorse Publishing. ISBN 978-1-62087-943-6.
