= Death Disturbs Mr. Jefferson =

1950 novel

- American edition
- Author: Anne Hocking
- Language: English
- Series: Chief Inspector William Austen
- Genre: Mystery crime
- Publisher: Geoffrey Bles
- Publication date: 1950
- Publication place: United Kingdom
- Media type: Print
- Preceded by: At The Cedars
- Followed by: Mediterranean Murder

Death Disturbs Mr. Jefferson is a 1950 mystery detective novel by the British writer Anne Hocking. It was the eleventh entry in her series featuring Chief Inspector William Austen of Scotland Yard, one of the many investigators during the Golden Age of Detective Fiction. It was published in the United States by Doubleday.

== Synopsis ==
Mister Jefferson lived a quiet life, interacting largely with his servants and having no know enemies. His sudden murder therefore poses a puzzle for the investigating police.

== Bibliography ==
- Hubin, Allen J. 1981-1985 Supplement to Crime Fiction, 1749-1980. Garland Pub., 1988.
- Nehr, Ellen. Doubleday Crime Club Compendium, 1928-1991. Offspring Press, 1992.
- Reilly, John M. Twentieth Century Crime & Mystery Writers. Springer, 2015.
