= Old Mrs. Fitzgerald =

1939 novel

- First edition
- Author: Anne Hocking
- Language: English
- Series: Chief Inspector William Austen
- Genre: Mystery crime
- Publisher: Geoffrey Bles
- Publication date: August 1939
- Publication place: United Kingdom
- Media type: Print
- Followed by: The Wicked Flee

Old Mrs. Fitzgerald is a 1939 detective novel by the British writer Anne Hocking. It was the first novel in her long-running series featuring Chief Inspector William Austen of Scotland Yard. Austen was one of a large number of investigators operating during the Golden Age of Detective Fiction. It was originally serialised in The Sunday Post. Reviewing the novel for The Observer Maurice Richardson wrote a favourable review.

== Bibliography ==
- Hubin, Allen J. 1981-1985 Supplement to Crime Fiction, 1749-1980. Garland Pub., 1988.
- Reilly, John M. Twentieth Century Crime & Mystery Writers. Springer, 2015.
