= The Wicked Flee =

1940 novel

- Author: Anne Hocking
- Language: English
- Series: Chief Inspector William Austen
- Genre: Mystery crime
- Publisher: Geoffrey Bles
- Publication date: 1940
- Publication place: United Kingdom
- Media type: Print
- Preceded by: Old Mrs. Fitzgerald
- Followed by: Miss Milverton

The Wicked Flee is a 1940 mystery crime novel by the British writer Anne Hocking. It was the second novel in a long-running series featuring her detective character Chief Inspector William Austen of Scotland Yard.

== Adaptation ==
In 1957 it was adapted into the British film The Surgeon's Knife directed by Gordon Parry and starring Donald Houston, Adrienne Corri and Lyndon Brook.

== Bibliography ==
- Goble, Alan. The Complete Index to Literary Sources in Film. Walter de Gruyter, 1999.
- Hubin, Allen J. 1981-1985 Supplement to Crime Fiction, 1749-1980. Garland Pub., 1988.
- Reilly, John M. Twentieth Century Crime & Mystery Writers. Springer, 2015.
