= Federal Ministry of Labour and Social Affairs =

Federal ministry of the Federal Republic of Germany

- Bundesministerium für Arbeit und Soziales

Agency overview
- Formed: 1919 (Weimar Republic), 1949 (West Germany)
- Jurisdiction: Government of the Weimar Republic (until 1934); Government of Nazi Germany (from 1934-1945); Government of Germany (from 1949)
- Headquarters: Wilhelmstraße 49 10117 Berlin; 52°30′45″N 13°23′01″E
- Annual budget: €164.920 billion (2021)
- Minister responsible: Alexander Schweitzer, Federal Minister for Labour and Social Affairs
- Website: www.bmas.de

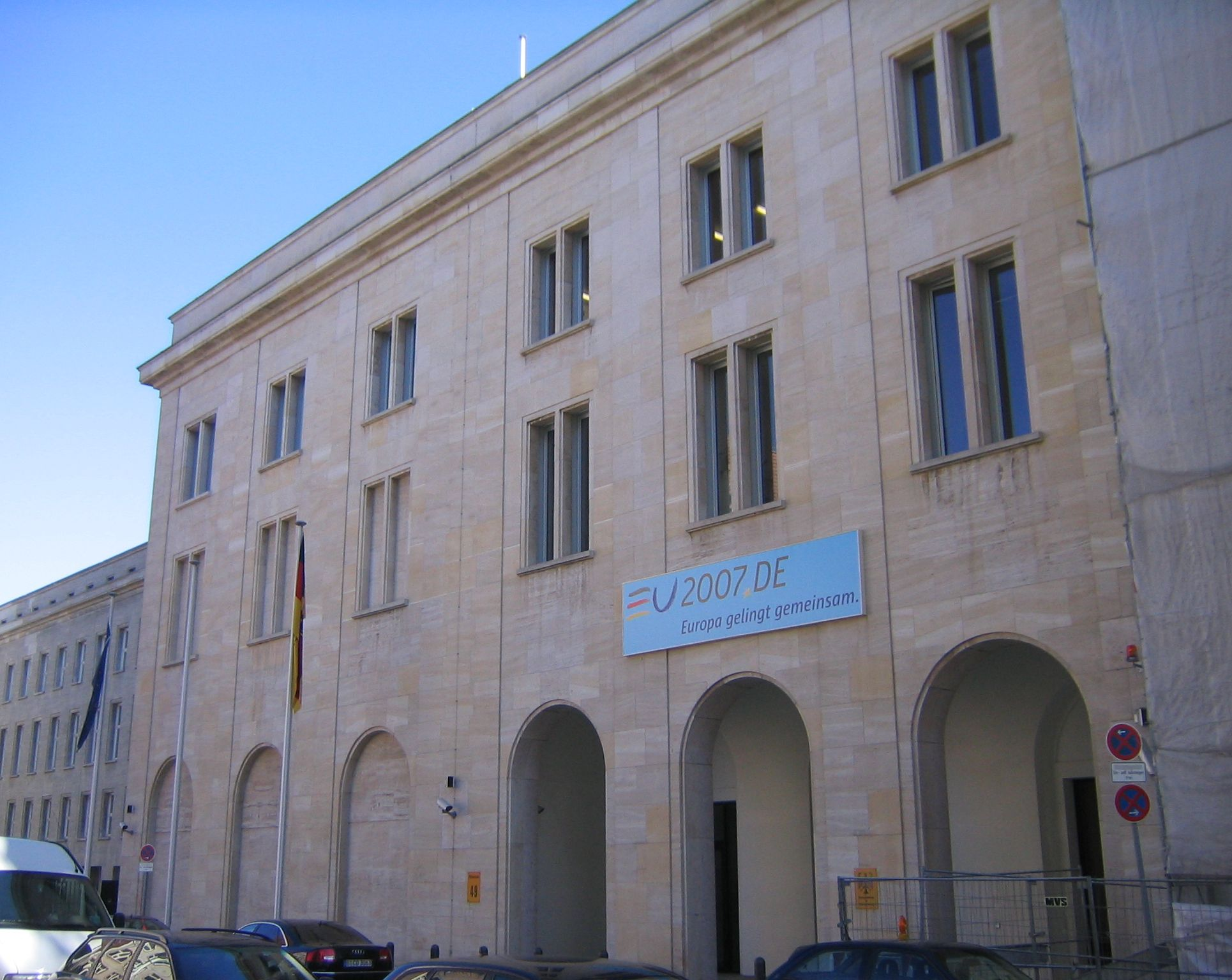
Main Entrance on Wilhelmstrasse

The Federal Ministry for Labour and Social Affairs (German: Bundesministerium für Arbeit und Soziales, (Note: Former German name: Bundesministerium für Arbeit und Sozialordnung. The English translation used by the ministry is the same.) pronounced [ˈbʊndəsminɪsˌteːʁiʊm fyːɐ̯ ˈʔaʁbaɪt ʔʊnt zoˈtsi̯aːləs]; abbreviated BMAS) is a federal ministry of the Federal Republic of Germany headed by the Federal Minister of Labour and Social Affairs as a member of the Cabinet of Germany (Bundesregierung). Its first location is on Wilhelmstrasse in Berlin, the second in Bonn.

== History ==
The Reich Ministry of Labour of the Weimar Republic was established on 13 February 1919 as the successor of the Labour Office (Reichsarbeitsamt) of the German Empire. The Social Democratic politician Gustav Bauer became the first Minister for Labour under Chancellor Philipp Scheidemann, whom he succeeded on 21 June that year. On the day of the Machtergreifung in January 1933, the German National politician and Der Stahlhelm leader Franz Seldte was appointed Minister for Labour in the Cabinet Hitler, a position he officially held until 1945, though the day-to-day affairs of the Ministry were managed largely by the State Secretaries Johannes Krohn (1933–1939) and Friedrich Syrup (1939–1945).

The West German Ministry for Labour was re-established in Bonn on 20 September 1949 with the Cabinet Adenauer I. According to the 1991 Berlin/Bonn Act it moved to its present seat in Berlin-Mitte in 2000, on premises formerly used by Goebbels' Propaganda Ministry and the East German National Front organisation.

During the Cabinet Schröder II from 2002 to 2005, the ministry had been dissolved and its responsibilities allocated to the Federal Ministry for Economics and Labour and the Federal Ministry of Health and Social Security. Responsibilities were re-allocated once again when a new government was formed under Chancellor Angela Merkel following the Bundestag elections of 2005. The German name was changed from Bundesministerium für Arbeit und Sozialordnung to Bundesministerium für Arbeit und Soziales.

== Ministers ==
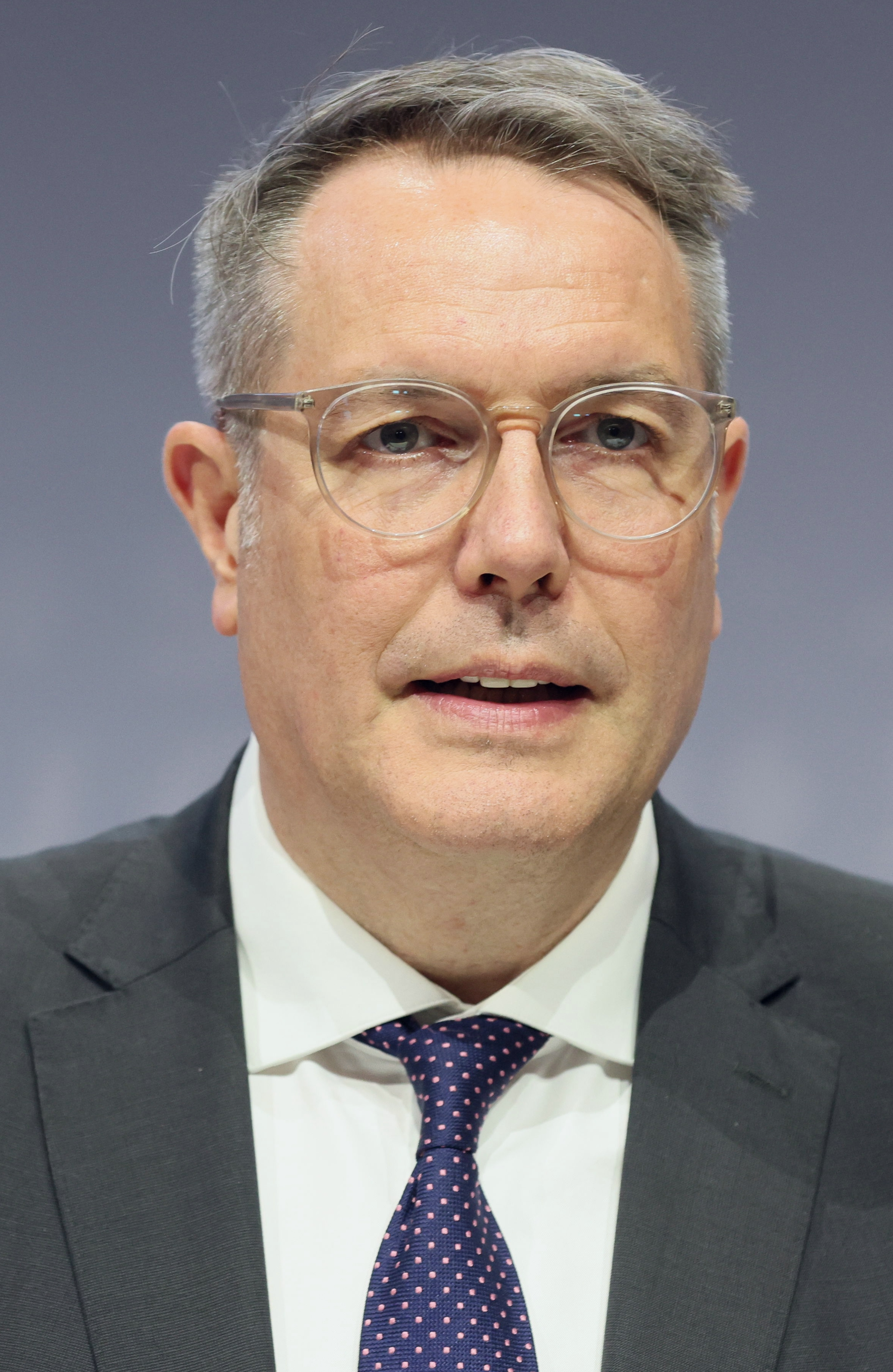
Alexander Schweitzer

=== German Reich (until 1945) ===
Reich Ministers

Political Party: Centre SPD NSDAP Independent

No.	Portrait	Minister of Labour	Took office	Left office	Time in office	Party	Cabinet
Weimar Republic (1919–1933)
1	Gustav Bauer	Gustav Bauer (1870–1944)	13 February 1919	20 June 1919	127 days	SPD	Scheidemann
2	Alexander Schlicke	Alexander Schlicke (1863–1940)	21 June 1919	21 June 1920	1 year, 0 days	SPD	Bauer; Müller
3	Heinrich Brauns	Heinrich Brauns (1868–1939)	25 June 1920	12 June 1928	7 years, 353 days	Centre	Fehrenbach; Wirth I–II; Cuno; Stresemann I–II; Marx I–II; Luther I–II; Marx III–IV
4	Rudolf Wissell	Rudolf Wissell (1869–1962)	28 June 1928	27 March 1930	1 year, 272 days	SPD	Müller II
5	Adam Stegerwald	Adam Stegerwald (1874–1945)	30 March 1930	30 May 1932	2 years, 61 days	Centre	Brüning I–II
–	Hermann Warmbold	Hermann Warmbold (1876–1976); Acting	1 June 1932	6 June 1932	5 days	Independent	Papen
6	Hugo Schäffer	Hugo Schäffer (1875–1945)	7 June 1932	17 November 1932	163 days	Independent	Papen
7	Friedrich Syrup	Friedrich Syrup (1881–1945)	3 December 1932	28 January 1933	56 days	Independent	Schleicher
Nazi Germany (1933–1945)
8	Franz Seldte	Franz Seldte (1882–1947)	30 January 1933	30 April 1945	12 years, 90 days	NSDAP	Hitler
9	Theo Hupfauer	Theo Hupfauer (1906–1993)	30 April 1945	5 May 1945	5 days	NSDAP	Goebbels
(8)	Franz Seldte	Franz Seldte (1882–1947)	5 May 1945	23 May 1945	18 days	NSDAP	Flensburg

=== Federal Republic of Germany (1949–present) ===
Federal Ministers

Political Party: CDU SPD

Name (Born-Died)		Portrait	Party	Term of Office		Chancellor (Cabinet)
Federal Minister for Labour (1949–1957) Federal Minister for Labour and Social Affairs (1957–2002)
1	Anton Storch (1892–1975)		CDU	20 September 1949	29 October 1957	Adenauer (I • II)
2	Theodor Blank (1905–1972)		CDU	29 October 1957	26 October 1965	Adenauer (III • IV • V); Erhard (I)
3	Hans Katzer (1919–1996)		CDU	26 October 1965	21 October 1969	Erhard (II); Kiesinger (I)
4	Walter Arendt (1925–2005)		SPD	22 October 1969	16 December 1976	Brandt (I • II); Schmidt (I)
5	Herbert Ehrenberg (1926–2018)		SPD	16 December 1976	28 April 1982	Schmidt (II • III)
6	Heinz Westphal (1924–1998)		SPD	28 April 1982	1 October 1982	Schmidt (III)
7	Norbert Blüm (1935–2020)		CDU	1 October 1982	27 October 1998	Kohl (I • II • III • IV • V)
8	Walter Riester (b. 1943)		SPD	27 October 1998	22 October 2002	Schröder (I)
Federal Minister for Economics and Labour				22 October 2002	22 November 2005	Schröder (II)
9a	Wolfgang Clement (1940–2020)		SPD	22 October 2002	22 November 2005	Schröder (II)
Federal Minister for Health and Social Security				22 October 2002	22 November 2005	Schröder (II)
9b	Ulla Schmidt (b. 1949)		SPD	22 October 2002	22 November 2005	Schröder (II)
Federal Minister for Labour and Social Affairs
10	Franz Müntefering (b. 1940)		SPD	22 November 2005	21 November 2007	Merkel (I)
11	Olaf Scholz (b. 1958)		SPD	21 November 2007	28 October 2009	Merkel (I)
12	Franz Josef Jung (b. 1949)		CDU	28 October 2009	27 November 2009	Merkel (II)
13	Ursula von der Leyen (b. 1958)		CDU	30 November 2009	17 December 2013	Merkel (II)
14	Andrea Nahles (b. 1970)		SPD	17 December 2013	28 September 2017	Merkel (III)
Katarina Barley was acting Federal Minister from 28 September 2017 to 14 March 2018.
15	Hubertus Heil (b. 1972)		SPD	14 March 2018	6 May 2025	Merkel (IV); Scholz (I)
16	Bärbel Bas (b. 1972)		SPD	6 May 2025	13 October 2026	Merz (I)
17	Alexander Schweitzer (b. 1973)		SPD	13 October 2026	Incumbent	Merz (I)

== Parliamentary State Sectretaries ==
- 1969–1974: Helmut Rohde (SPD)
- 1972–1976: Herbert Ehrenberg (SPD)
- 1974–1982: Hermann Buschfort (SPD)
- 1980–1982: Anke Fuchs (SPD)
- 1982: Rudolf Dreßler (SPD)
- 1982: Jürgen Egert (SPD)
- 1982–1991: Wolfgang Vogt (CDU)
- 1982–1984: Heinrich Franke (CDU)
- 1984–1989: Stefan Höpfinger (CSU)
- 1989–1992: Horst Seehofer (CSU)
- 1991–1998: Horst Günther (CDU)
- 1992–1998: Rudolf Kraus (CSU)
- 1998–2008: Gerd Andres (SPD)
- 1998–2002: Ulrike Mascher (SPD)
- 2002–2005: Ditmar Staffelt (SPD)
- 2002–2005: Rezzo Schlauch (Bündnis 90/Die Grünen)
- 2002–2009: Franz Thönnes (SPD)
- 2005–2009: Klaus Brandner (SPD)
- 2009–2013: Ralf Brauksiepe (CDU)
- 2009–2013: Hans-Joachim Fuchtel (CDU)
- 2013–2018: Gabriele Lösekrug-Möller (SPD)
- 2013-2025: Anette Kramme (SPD)
- since 2018: Kerstin Griese (SPD)
- since 2025: Natalie Pawlik (SPD)
- since 2025: Katja Mast (SPD)

== State secretaries ==
As of May 2025, The Secretaries of State are Leonie Gebers, Lilian Tschan and Michael Schäfer.

== Building ==
The ministry is located within the former Reich Ministry of Public Enlightenment and Propaganda. For the building's interior courtyard, artist Daniel Buren was commissioned with his large-scale installation La Grande Fenêtre (2001).
