= Miss Milverton =

1941 novel

- American first edition
- Author: Anne Hocking
- Language: English
- Series: Chief Inspector William Austen
- Genre: Mystery crime
- Publisher: Geoffrey Bles
- Publication date: 1941
- Publication place: United Kingdom
- Media type: Print
- Preceded by: The Wicked Flee
- Followed by: One Shall Be Taken

Miss Milverton is a 1941 mystery crime novel by the British author Anne Hocking. First published in London by Geoffrey Bles, it was the third in her series featuring Chief Inspector William Austen as part of the Golden Age of Detective Fiction. It was published in the United States in 1942 by Doubleday under the alternative title Poison is a Bitter Brew.

== Synopsis ==
Miss Milverton, also known as Aunt Augusta, is the spinster owner of a large house in Cornwall. Her numerous relatives include her wastrel nephew and heir. When he is murdered, Scotland Yard'sChief Inspector Austen is called in.

== Bibliography ==
- Hubin, Allen J. 1981-1985 Supplement to Crime Fiction, 1749-1980. Garland Pub., 1988.
- Nehr, Ellen. Doubleday Crime Club Compendium, 1928-1991. Offspring Press, 1992.
- Reilly, John M. Twentieth Century Crime & Mystery Writers. Springer, 2015.
