= Arabian Serenade =

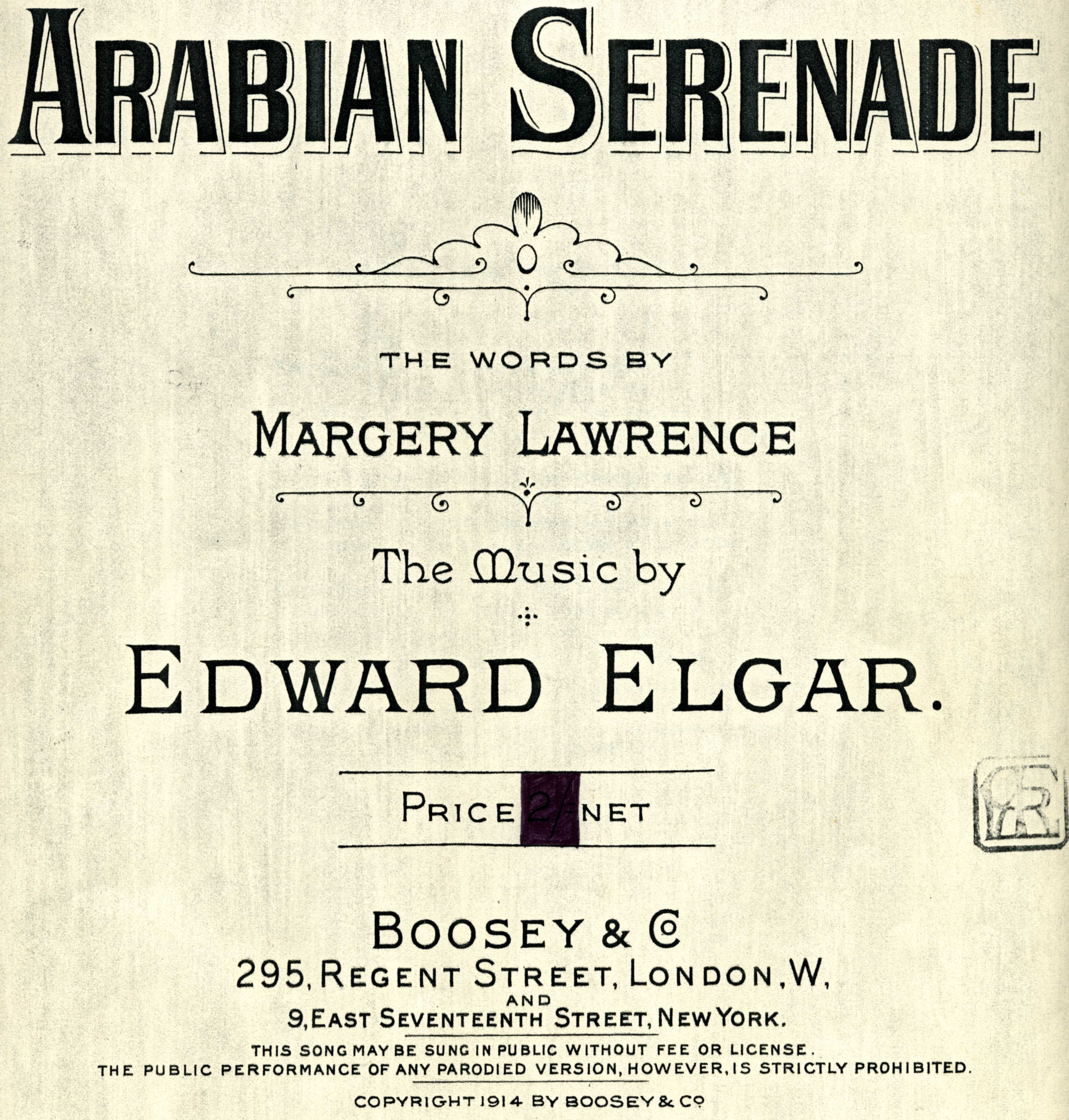

"Arabian Serenade" is a poem written by Margery Lawrence and set to music by the English composer Edward Elgar in 1914.

The poem is from "Songs of Childhood and other Verses" by Margery Lawrence, published by Grant Richards, Ltd.

This is one of Elgar's finest songs. In it he uses the Phrygian mode, which is popular in Arabian music.

== Lyrics ==
The repetition of certain words and phrases in the song is not shown.

ARABIAN SERENADE

The silver silence of the night has spun

A web of glamour o'er the purple sea.

The Watcher of the Sky has lit his lamp, -

Waken, my white one; come thou forth with me.

We will go softly through the shining meadows,

Setting our faces to the distant moon;

Drenching our feet in pureness, and our souls

Drenched in the sweetness of the bulbul's tune.

Come forth, O maid, the Feast is well prepared.

Between the dim wood and the purple sea

The world hangs breathless and the stars look down.

Waken, Zareiba; come thou forth with me.

== Recordings ==
- Songs and Piano Music by Edward Elgar has "Arabian Serenade" performed by Peter Savidge (baritone), with David Owen Norris (piano).
- The Songs of Edward Elgar SOMM CD 220 Christopher Maltman (baritone) with Malcolm Martineau (piano), at Southlands College, London, April 1999
