= Anne Hocking =

English crime writer (1889–1966)

- Born: Naomi Annie Hocking; 1889; Thornton Heath, Surrey, England
- Died: 17 March 1966 (aged 76–77); Reading, Berkshire, England
- Occupation: Novelist
- Writing career
- Genres: Murder mystery, Crime fiction

Naomi Annie Hocking Messer (1889 – 17 March 1966), known as Anne Hocking and nicknamed "Mona", was an English crime writer, best remembered for her detective stories featuring Chief Superintendent William Austen, starting with Old Mrs. Fitzgerald (1939).

== Life and career ==
The daughter of Joseph Hocking, niece of Silas Hocking and Salome Hocking and sister of Elizabeth Nisot and Joan Shill, all writers, Anne Hocking was a prolific mystery writer, author of more than 40 genre novels between 1930 and 1962. One of them (1940's The Wicked Flee) was made into a British crime film in 1957.

She was married first, in 1910, to Frederick William Dunlop, who died in August 1914 in Buckinghamshire. She married secondly, in 1918, to Henry R Messer. She died at Battle Hospital in Reading, Berkshire in 1966.

== Bibliography ==
=== Chief Superintendent William Austen series ===
- Old Mrs. Fitzgerald (1939). Serialised Weekly, Sunday Post (1939)
- The Wicked Flee (1940)
- Miss Milverton (1941) AKA Poison is a Bitter Brew (Doubleday 1942)
- One Shall Be Taken (1942)
- Nile Green AKA Death Loves a Shining Mark (1943)
- Six Green Bottles (1943)
- The Vultures Gather (1945)
- Death at the Wedding (1946)
- Prussian Blue (1947) AKA The Finishing Touch (Doubleday 1947)
- At "The Cedars" (1949)
- Death Disturbs Mr. Jefferson (1950)
- Mediterranean Murder AKA Killing Kin (1951)
- The Best Laid Plans (1952) (Doubleday 1950)
- There's Death in the Cup (1952)
- Death Among The Tulips (1953)
- The Evil That Men Do (1953)
- And No One Wept (1954)
- Poison in Paradise (1955)
- A Reason for Murder (1955)
- Murder at Mid-Day (1956)
- Relative Murder (1957)
- The Simple Way of Poison (1957)
- Epitaph for a Nurse AKA A Victim Must Be Found (1958)
- Poisoned Chalice (1959)
- To Cease Upon the Midnight (1959)
- The Thin-Spun Life (1960)
- Candidates for Murder (1961)
- He Had to Die (1962)
- Murder Cries Out (1968) (Finished by Evelyn Healey)

=== Other crime novels ===
- Cat's Paw (1933)
- Death Duel (1933)
- Walk Into My Parlour (1934)
- The Hunt is Up (1934)
- Without the Option (1935)
- Stranglehold (1936)
- The House of En-dor (1936)
- As I Was Going to St. Ives (1937)
- What a Tangled Web (1937)
- Ill Deeds Done (1938)
- The Little Victims Play (1938)
- So Many Doors (1939)
- Deadly is the Evil Tongue (1940)
- Night's Candles (1941)

=== Crime novels, signed by "Mona Messer" ===
- A Castle for Sale (1930)
- Mouse Trap (1931)

=== Non-crime novels, signed by "Mona Messer" ===
- Eternal Compromise (1932)
- A Dinner of Herbs (1933)
- The End of the Lane (1933)
- Playing Providence (1934)
- Wife of Richard (1934)
- Cuckoo’s Brood (1935)
- Life Owes Me Something (1936)
- Tomorrow Also (1937)
- Marriage is Like That (1938)
- Stranger’s Vineyard (1939)
- The Gift of a Daughter (1940)
