= Margery Lawrence =

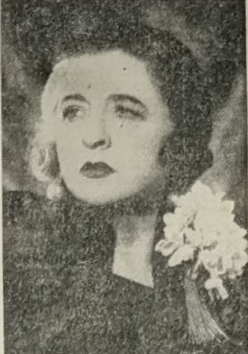
- Born: Margery Harriet Lawrence; 8 August 1889; Wolverhampton, England
- Died: 13 November 1969 (age 80); London
- Occupation: writer
- Writing career
- Period: 1913 - 1969
- Genres: Fantasy fiction, Horror fiction, Detective fiction

Margery Lawrence (8 August 1889 – 13 November 1969) was an English romance, fantasy, horror and detective fiction author who specialized in ghost stories.

== Life and work ==
She was born Margery Harriet Lawrence, in Wolverhampton. Her father was solicitor Richard J. Lawrence, her mother was called Grace, and she had at least two siblings Allan and Monica. Her father published her early poetry in Songs of Childhood, and Other Verses, in 1913. Her poem "Arabian Serenade" was set to music by composer Edward Elgar in 1914.

Lawrence was also an illustrator, and produced drawings for The Hills of Ruel, and Other Stories (1921) by Fiona MacLeod.

Her earliest collections, the Round Table sequence, include Nights of the Round Table (1926) and The Terraces of Night (1932). Stefan Dziemianowicz describes these stories as "simple but solidly told tales of horror and the supernatural that are mindful of the classic ghost story tradition but adorned with enough contemporary flourishes" to demonstrate that Lawrence was comfortable working variants on this tradition. These stories often appeared in British pulp magazines such as The Sovereign Magazine and Hutchinson's Mystery-Story prior to book publication.

During the 1920s she wrote general fiction, and her 1925 romance novel Red Heels was filmed by the Austrian film company Sascha Film as Das Spielzeug von Paris. A list of Lawrence's published novels to 1945 includes: Miss Brandt, Adventuress; Red Heels; Bohemian Glass; Drums of Youth; Silken Sarah; The Madonna of Seven Moons; Madam Holle; The Crooked Smile; Overture to Life; The Bridge of Wonder; and Step Light, Lady.

In 1941, she published another collection of short fiction, Strange Caravan (Robert Hale, 1941). A list of her short stories to 1945 also includes: Snapdragon; and The Floating Cafe.

Her best-known supernatural works include Number Seven, Queer Street (Robert Hale, 1945), a collection that purports to be the case histories of an occult detective, Dr Miles Pennoyer, as related by his assistant Jerome Latimer. Lawrence stated that this series was inspired by Algernon Blackwood's John Silence stories and Dion Fortune's Dr. Taverner series. Like May Sinclair before her, Lawrence became a confirmed spiritualist and believer in reincarnation in later years, and her book is heavy with didactic occultist dialogue. Another well-known supernatural volume is Master of Shadows (1959).

The Rent in the Veil is a fantasy involving a time slip to Ancient Rome, and Bride of Darkness is a tale of witchcraft in the modern world.

== Spiritualism ==
Lawrence was a spiritualist. In the foreword to Ferry Over Jordan (Psychic Book Club, 1944), Lawrence explains that during the latter part of 1941 she had written a further group of articles on Spiritualism for Psychic News. It was the resulting large number of inquiries that prompted editor Maurice Barbanell to suggest that Lawrence compile and expand upon those articles in book form, which she undertook at London between August 1942 and May 1943. The book was intended to be a primer on the much-discussed subject of Spiritualism. Apprehensive that her readers might be disappointed that her latest book was not a further novel or book of short stories, Lawrence took care to explain that she had not recently "taken to Spiritualism", but rather had been deeply interested in it for many years:

"My interest in it dates actually from the moment when I saw a near relation three nights after he died, when he gave me specific instructions about the finding of a box containing important papers. They were found precisely where he said--and from that moment I became deeply interested in what, throughout this book, I have called the "Other Side". Somewhere that man was obviously still alive! Somewhere he was thinking of us, anxious to help, caring what happened; in a word, he was still alive somewhere, and I was determined to find out where" [foreword, p. 5].

== Select bibliography ==
- Miss Brandt, Adventuress (1923)
- Red Heels (1924)
- Nights of the Round Table (1926)
- Bohemian Glass (1928)
- Drums of Youth (1929)
- Snapdragon (1931)
- The Madonna of Seven Moons (1931)
- Madam Holle (1934)
- The Crooked Smile (1935)
- The Floating Cafe (1936)
- The Bridge of Wonder (1939)
- Step Light, Lady (1942)
- Number Seven, Queer Street (1945)
- What is this Spiritualism? (1946)
- Cardboard Castle (1951)
- The Rent in the Veil (1951)
- Evil Harvest (1954)
- The Tomorrow of Yesterday (1966)
- Bride of Darkness (1967)
- Over My Shoulder (1968)
- The Green Bough (1968)
- Autumn Rose (1971)
