= Hanimana Alibeyli =

Azerbaijani poet-playwright

- Born: 20 April 1920; Keshla, Azerbaijan
- Died: 7 May 2007 (aged 87); Baku, Azerbaijan
- Occupation(s): poet, writer
- Known for: founder of children's drama in Azerbaijan

Hanimana Sabir gizi Alibeyli (Azerbaijani: Xanımana Sabir qızı Əlibəyli; 20 April 1920, Keshlya – 7 May 2007) was an Azerbaijani poet-playwright, Honored Art Worker of Azerbaijan, laureate of state awards, and Presidential Scholar. She is considered the founder of children's drama in Azerbaijan. She is said to leave an indelible mark on the history of the development of Azerbaijani literature.

== Early life and education ==
Hanimana Alibeyli was born on 20 April 1920 in the village of Keshla. Alibeyli was the first child in an aristocratic family with four girls and three boys. She received secondary education at school #13 in Baku, entered the Medical Institute, graduating from it in 1942, and then got her second higher education at the Faculty of Philology of the Azerbaijan State University.

== Career ==
Alibeyli entered the world of literature with the first poem "Ana" (Mother) published in 1995 in the magazine Azerbaijan Gadyny. Later, she published one after other books of poems for children including, Little Doctor, He who does not work, he does not eat, Throw me in the sun, Little Refugees. Alibeyli's plays, The Birthday of the Hare, The Beautiful Beauty and others were staged on the stages of the Young Spectator's Theatre and the Puppet Theater and the performances The Birthday of the Hare and Aidjan were awarded state prizes.

Alibeyli's works were published in the newspaper Azerbaijan Pioneer and the magazines Geyyarchin and Gunesh.

Alibeyli is considered the founder of children's drama in Azerbaijan. She was a presidential scholar.

== Death and legacy ==
Hanimana Alibeyli died on 7 May 2007.

In 2010, the 90th anniversary of Alibeyli was celebrated at the Azerbaijan State Young Spectator's Theater. The event was held by the Ministry of Culture of Tourism of Azerbaijan.
