= Smoke over Birkenau =

1945 book by Seweryna Szmaglewska

- Author: Seweryna Szmaglewska
- Language: Polish
- Subject: Autobiography, Holocaust
- Genre: Autobiographical novel
- Publisher: Czytelnik Publishing House
- Publication date: December 1945
- Publication place: Poland
- Media type: Print
- Pages: 302 pages (first edition)
- OCLC: 474661282

Smoke over Birkenau (Polish: Dymy nad Birkenau) is a 1945 autobiographical book by Polish writer Seweryna Szmaglewska, based on her experiences as an inmate of the Auschwitz-Birkenau concentration camp during World War II. It was one of the first works on this topic, and it became highly influential in shaping the public's knowledege of this topic. Due to its literary and factual values, it was considered an outstanding achievement of camp literature.

== Translations ==
The book received numerous editions in Polish. The book was translated and published in English already in 1945. It was also translated to several other languages, including Czech (1947), Ukrainian (1990), Spanish (2006) and German (2020). As of 2009, the book had at least 18 editions in Polish, and has been translated into at least 10 languages.

== Background ==
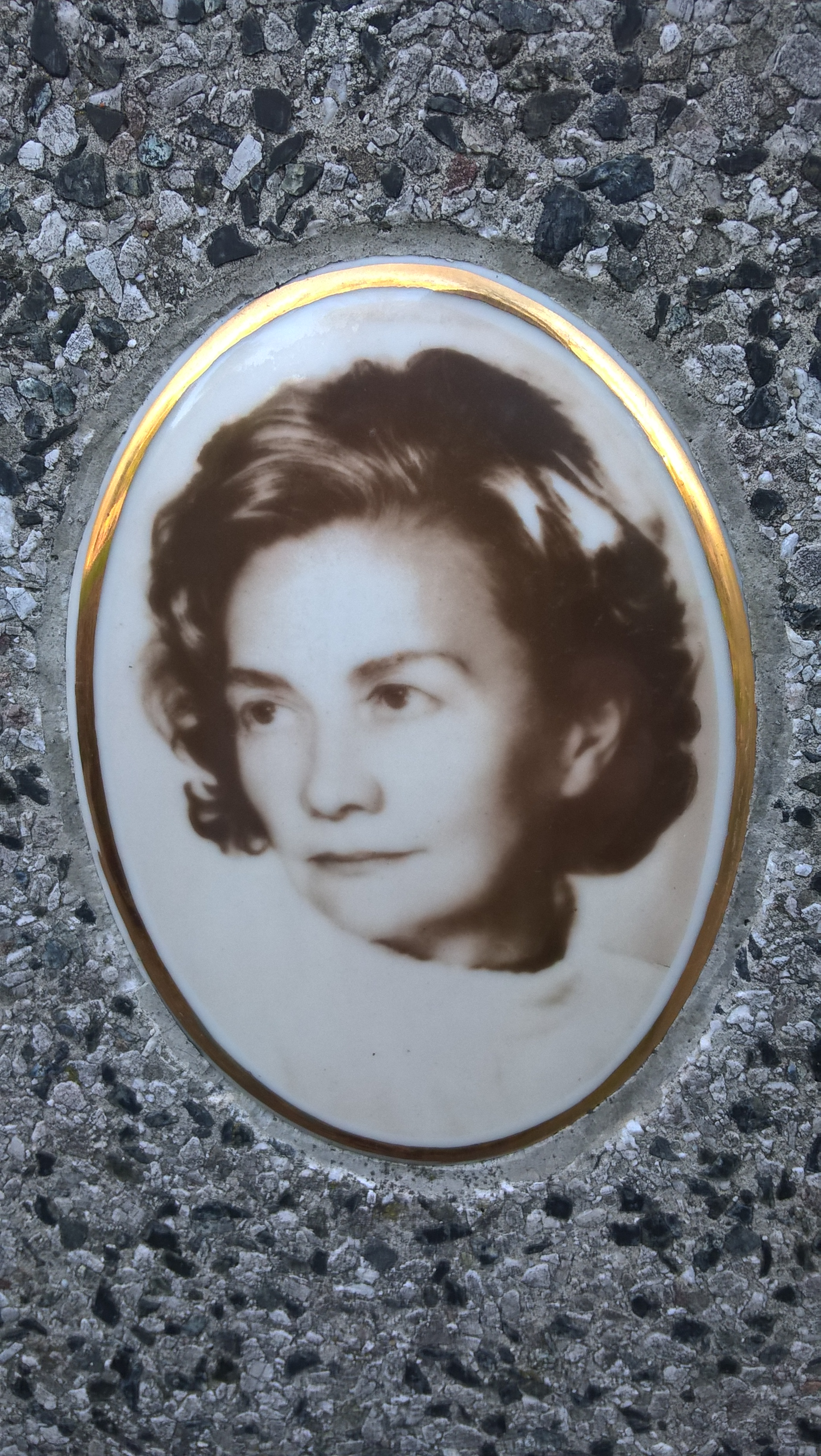
Portrait of Szmaglewska

Seweryna Szmaglewska was an inmate of the Auschwitz-Birkenau concentration camp during World War II in the years 1942–1945. She began her work on the book shortly after she was liberated, describing her reasons as her duty to her fellow inmates, many of whom perished in the camp, and the need to educate the world about Nazi crimes, which she felt Germans would try to hide, given her experience of the powerful Nazi propaganda before and during the war. The book was completed by the summer of 1945 and was published in December that year in Poland by the Czytelnik Publishing House and in United States by Henry Holt and Company.

== Reception ==
The book is Szaglewska's first book, and it is also her best known work on the international level. The book was one of the first (Note: While some sources describe this work as "the first literary account of Auschwitz", this is incorrect - a number of other literary accounts was published before Dymy..., both in Polish and in other languages.) literary accounts of the Auschwitz-Birkenau concentration camp, and is considered an important early contribution to related literature and historiography. It "quickly became one of the most widely read accounts of life and death in Auschwitz" and has been argued to be the most influential literary work about that camp, significantly shaping public awareness in this context. It also constituted an important piece of evidence at the Nuremberg trials. By 1947 there were over 30 reviews and analysis of the book in Polish and international press and scholarly works. Her work has been praised by critics and historians such as August Grodzicki, Piotr Kuncewicz and Alvin Hirsch Rosenfeld. Arkadiusz Morawiec called the book "one of the most significant (as a fact-collecting, intellectual, and artistic) achievement in the domain of Nazi concentration camp literature". Sławomir Buryła referred to it as a "classic" of that genre.

Due to its literary and factual values, it was considered an outstanding achievement of camp literature. It has been described as "one of the most evocative accounts of the grueling work done by women prisoners... as well differing camp lives of non-Jews and Jews". It has been compared to Charlotte Delbo's Auschwitz and After and Days and Memory.

The book has been a compulsory reading in Polish schools (in the years 1946–49 and again since 1994).
