= Gullu Yologlu =

Gullu Yologlu is an Azerbaijani academic and the chairperson of the World Turkology Center. They have contributed to ethnology, folklore studies, literature, history, religious studies, and other scientific fields in Azerbaijan by providing information, analysis, and outcomes with their scholarly and scholarly-publicistic articles and books and their scientific and artistic radio and television programs since the 1990s. Her main research areas are faiths, traditions, ethnic identities, shamanist past, and material and non-material culture of small-numbered Turkic peoples living in countries from the Siberia to the Balkans.

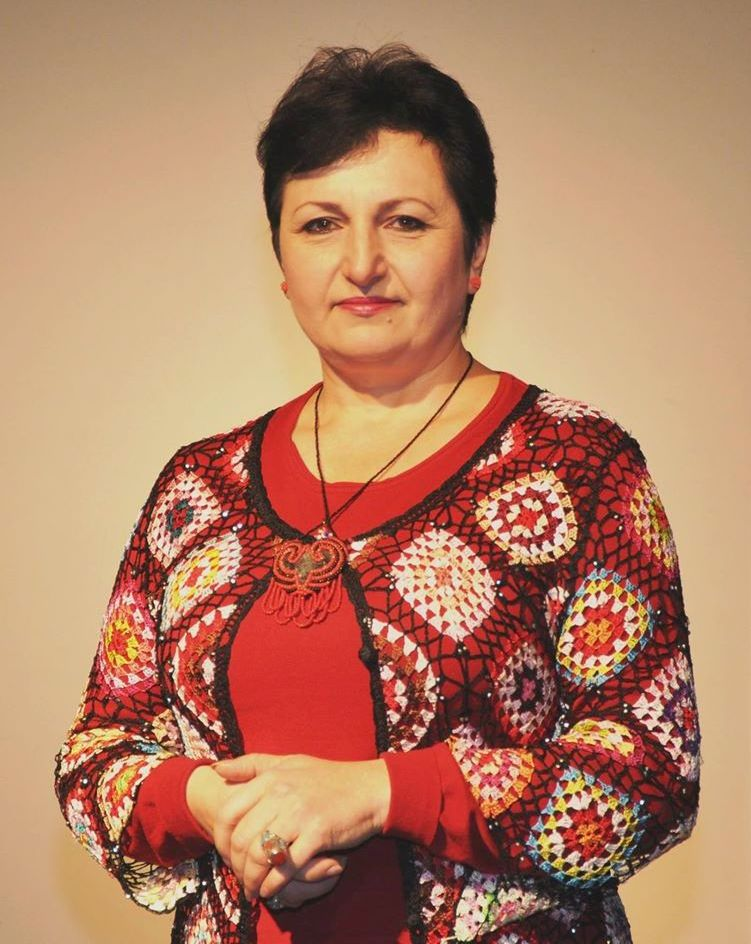
Gullu Yologlu

== Early life ==
Gullu Yologlu Mammadli was born into a family of teachers, in Mesha-oba (Mesha Shambul) village (which is in Balakan district at present) in Zagatala district of Azerbaijan on May 5, 1963, although her origins are in the Janalli village of Gazakh district. Her father, Yologlu Kamil Gulmammadov, a history-literature teacher, and her mother, Nahida Mahmud Bayramova, a physics-math teacher, worked in Zagatala.

Yologlu moved to Janalli, her father’s homeland, with her parents when she was 3.

== Education ==
Finishing school named after Samad Vurgun in Gazakh in 1980, Yologlu enrolled in the Institute of the Russian Language and Literature named after Mirza Fatali Akhundov (at present Baku Slavic University) in the same year and graduated in 1985. She interned at Astrakhan Pedagogical State University (Russia) during 1983-1984.

== Academia ==
Yologlu would constantly visit Moldova and conduct research on the Romanians and Gagauz people starting from her undergraduate years. She described Azerbaijani-Gagauz literary ties in the second chapter of her graduation paper on Azerbaijan-Moldova literary relations. The second chapter of Yologlu's thesis, which she defended in 1992, titled “Azerbaijan-Moldova literary relations” in which she had developed her research on the Gagauz people.

She is the author of 6 books and 123 printed scholarly publications.

She defended her doctoral dissertation titled “Ceremonies of Turkic Peoples (historical-ethnographic study on the basis of Tuva, Khakas and Gagauz Turks’ materials)” in 2006.

She is a member of the Scientific Council of the Ahi Evran University (Kirshehir, Turkey).

Yologlu has been a member of the Journalists’ Union of Azerbaijan since 1992 and the Writers's Union of Azerbaijan since 1996. In 1998, she was elected as an associate member of the Atatürk Cultural Center in Ankara, Turkey. Suleyman Demirel, the then president of Turkey, presented a diploma to Yologlu in the conference hall of TIKA (Turkish Cooperation and Coordination Agency).

She is a lead researcher at the Azerbaijan National Academy of Sciences (ANAS) and a member of the Dissertation Council. In 2021-2023, she worked as the Chief of the Comparative Ethnography of Turkic Peoples Department of the Institute of Archaeology and Ethnography of ANAS. Since 2023, she has been the chief of the History and Ethnology of Turkic Peoples Department of the Institute of History and Ethnology of ANAS.

== Television and radio programs ==
Yologlu has presented and authored several radio and television programs. She has been author and presenter of "Soyumuz, soykökümüz" ("Our ancestry and roots") and “Dədə Qorqud-1300” ("Dada Gorgud-1300") rubrics at musical informational program "Sahar" ("Morning"), also "Min illərin işığı" ("The Light of Millennia") and editor of “Qopuz” (“Gopuz”) TV programs and "Böyük çöl" ("Great Steppe"), "Soyumuz, soykökümüz" ("Our ancestry and roots"), "Yurd yeri" ("Motherland") radio programs at the Azerbaijan Television and Radio Broadcasting Closed Joint-Stock Company. At present, she is the scriptwriter of "Əsrlərdən gələn səslar" ("The Sounds of Ages") and "Türk elləri" ("Turkic Lands") and also presenter of "Keçmişdən gələcəyə" ("From the Past to the Future") programs.

== Activities ==
Yologlu is the chairperson of the World Turkology Center, founded on October 3, 2019 in Baku.

Since 2022, she has been chairperson of the Women's Council of the Public Association for the Development of Relations Among Turkic Elders (TAIB).

== Books ==
1. The Gagauz People (Qaqauzlar). – Baku, “Azarnashr”, 1996 48 p.

It provides detailed information about the history, traditions, language, faith, and literature of the Gagauz people living in Moldova. The book played an important role in helping Azerbaijani readers to know more about the Orthodox Christian Gagauz people aftermath of the dissolution of the USSR.

2. Gagauz Folklore (Qaqouz folkloru). - Baku, “Yazichi”, 1996, 200 p.

In her book “Gagauz Folklore”, Yologlu has included Gagauz people's folklore materials, which she had collected during her visits to Moldova and translated into Azerbaijani with a large introduction. Presented materials describe the Gagauz people’s deportation to southern areas of Moldova from the Balkans during Russian-Ottoman wars and anti-Turkish policies and efforts to separate the people from its roots.

3. Dada Gorgud’s Age (Dədə Qorqud yaşı). - Baku, “Yeni Nashrlar evi”, 1999, 136 p.

Scholar's collected articles describe creation and versions of “The Book of Dada Gorgud”, highlight various issues, such as "folklore" that was produced under Soviet directions, shamans' activities in Siberia and other countries under the shield of Islam and Christianity, Russification and Christianization policies of the Russian Empire in Siberia, mothers' roles in mixed marriages, etc.

4. Family Rituals of the Turks (based on the ethnographic materials of the Tuva, Khakas and Gagauz Turks) (Türklerin aile merasimleri (tıva, xakas, qaqauz türklərinin etnoqrafik materialları əsasında)). – Ankara (Turkey), 1999, 180 p.

Family-life ceremonies of predominantly Muslim Azerbaijani Turks, Christian Gagauz and Khakas Turks and Lamaist (Tibetan Buddhist) Tuva Turks are studied in comparison, and common features in deeper layers are researched by delicately putting aside the religions that were adopted willingly or forcefully. The book reveals that the roots of a lot of traditions and ceremonies of Turkic peoples that were thought to be derived from Islam, Christianity, and Tibetan Buddhism were actually the same and related to shamanism, and they continue their existence under current religious beliefs.

5. The First Letter (translations from Romanian literature) ("İlk məktub" (Rumıniya ədəbiyyatından tərcümələr)). – Baku, “Adiloghlu”, 2002, 258 p.

The book presents translated stories and narratives mostly on political topics written by members of ethnic groups in Romania, including the Moldovan-Romanians, who were torn apart by the decision of the central Soviet government, and Tatars settled down in Dobruja fleeing persecutions from Tsarist Russia, with a large introduction. Some of the stories describe methods of torture used under the Soviet regime against Romanians.

6. Seasonal Ceremonies (on the basis of materials of the Turkic peoples) ("Mövsüm mərasimləri" (türk xalqlarının materialları əsasında)). – Baku, “Khazar University”, 2009, 218 p.

The monograph studies influences of climate, geographical features, neighbors, and historical roots on Turkic peoples' ceremonies and way of life. Most of the materials were collected during Yologlu's visits to Russia (Southern Siberia, Ural-Idel region, North Caucasus), Central Asia, Turkey, Iran, Iraq, and other countries.

7. Last Wish - Last Breath ("Son həvəs - son nəfəs"). - Baku, 2010.

8. "Will Russia Survive?" ("Rusiya yaşayacaqmı?"). - Baku, "Qanun", 2015.

9. The Place of Nowruz in the Ceremonial System of the Turkic Peoples ("Türk xalqlarının mərasim sistemində Novruzun yeri"). - Baku, 2018.

10. Aybike Khan ("Aybikə Xan"). - Baku, "Sabah", 2023

== Awards ==
In 1998, shortly after her speech at the 10th Assembly of Azerbaijani Writers Yologlu was awarded an individual scholarship by Heydar Aliyev, the then president of the Republic of Azerbaijan. She was declared “The Most Diligent Scholar of the Year” by “Simourg” International Award Foundation in 2001. She was awarded the “Award of Service of 2002” by KIBATEK (Cyprus, the Balkans, Institute of Eurasian Studies) in 2003.
