= The Vultures Gather =

1945 novel

- Author: Anne Hocking
- Language: English
- Series: Chief Inspector William Austen
- Genre: Detective
- Publisher: Geoffrey Bles
- Publication date: 1945
- Publication place: United Kingdom
- Media type: Print
- Preceded by: Six Green Bottles
- Followed by: Death at the Wedding

The Vultures Gather is a 1945 mystery detective novel by the British writer Anne Hocking. It was published in London by Geoffrey Bles. Written during the Golden Age of Detective Fiction, it is the seventh in her series featuring Chief Superintendent William Austen of Scotland Yard.

== Synopsis ==
In Cornwall, a wealthy, domineering elderly woman is about to change her will. Her relatives all gather at the house, only for the lady to be murdered. The local police call in assistance from Scotland Yard.

== Bibliography ==
- Hubin, Allen J. 1981-1985 Supplement to Crime Fiction, 1749-1980. Garland Pub., 1988.
- Reilly, John M. Twentieth Century Crime & Mystery Writers. Springer, 2015.
