= Caucasian days =

Days in the Caucasus or Caucasian Days (French: Jours caucasiens) is a memoir by the French writer of Azeri origin Banine, published in Paris in 1945. Ummulbanu Asadullayeva, to give Banine her full name, was the granddaughter of peasants who had become fabulously wealthy through the discovery and sale of oil. In Days in the Caucasus she recalls her upbringing in oil-boom Baku by a Baltic German governess and a devoutly Muslim grandmother who swore like a trooper. It's a tale of East meets West: of pogroms, revolution, end of empire, coming of age, forced marriage and multiple escapes – to Persia, Georgia and eventually Paris.

It describes the history of Azerbaijan in the 1910s and 1920s, its national culture, mores and customs, drawing on the author's reminiscences.

The first English translation of the memoir by Anne Thompson-Ahmadova, with the title Days in the Caucasus, was published in London in 2019.

== Plot ==
=== Part One ===
Banine begins her memoir with an account of her birth in Baku in 1905, a turbulent year throughout the Russian Empire. Her family is fabulously wealthy, as her peasant great-grandfather struck oil on his land. Banine's mother dies of post-partum fever, unable to get medical help as inter-ethnic violence rages within the oil-boom city.

Banine recalls her early childhood as a very happy time. She and her three older sisters are brought up by a Baltic German governess, Fräulein Anna, whom Banine adores. This European lifestyle is very different from the traditional Islamic ways of Banine's corpulent grandmother, who lives in her own apartment in the same house. She speaks only Azeri, prays five times a day and swears like a trooper.

The extended family spend the long hot summers at their country house near the sea, with its lush garden and vineyards in the midst of a desert. The house is full of poker-playing aunts, uncles and cousins engaged in endless recriminations over division of the family fortune. Weddings, with transvestite dancers for the men's celebrations, women's parties in the hamam, or bath-house, and endless story telling are part of life in the country.

Banine's father, Mirza, marries a Muslim Ossetian by the name of Amina who has led a society life in Moscow. To the shock of her in-laws Amina begins to entertain all sorts of guests, including unmarried young men “of unknown parentage”. Banine realises that marriage and motherhood are not the only life to which she can aspire. Banine's oldest sister elopes with a Russian engineer. She is brought back home, married off to a relative and moves to Moscow.

The October Revolution brings chaos to the Caucasus. A military dictatorship, dominated by Armenians, grabs power in Baku and hunts down wealthy Azerbaijanis. In the dead of night Banine and her family flee their home to take shelter with their Armenian neighbours. The family sail to Enzeli in Iran, which is also in the grip of unrest. After Turkish forces restore calm in Baku, the family sail back home. Banine's father is now minister of commerce in the government of the new independent Azerbaijan Democratic Republic.

There are more parties than ever at Banine's home, as the ranks of Baku society have been swollen by refugees from Russia, all awaiting the imminent demise of the Bolsheviks. Banine's second sister marries and leaves on a trip to Paris with her husband, her stepmother Amina and sister number three. Banine is heartbroken to be left behind, nursing a sense of great injustice and dreaming of Paris. Practically the following day she hears the Internationale being sung in the streets – Red Army troops have entered Baku. The democratic republic is over and so is Banine's childhood.

=== Part Two ===
Banine's maternal grandfather Musa Naghiyev dies and his vast wealth passes to his wife and his four granddaughters – Banine and her sisters. Banine becomes a millionaire just as the Bolsheviks have taken over, so she never takes possession of her inheritance.

Banine's father is arrested and thrown in prison. The remaining family spend their last summer in the country, where part of the house is requisitioned as a sanatorium. Banine and her cousin Gulnar are fascinated by Gregory, a recuperating Bolshevik, and get caught up in revolutionary fervour to the horror of their grandmother. Banine has a crush on Gregory's friend, the Russian Bolshevik Andrey.

Their house in Baku has been requisitioned too. Cousin Gulnar is desperate to get married, so that once she has lost her virginity she can enjoy as many affairs as she likes. She marries a distant relative and Banine moves in with them in Baku's medieval walled city, where time seems to have stood still.

Banine enjoys her first job, teaching music at the eccentric Bolshevik Conservatoire for Muslim Girls. Andrey attends a special concert there and invites Banine to visit him with Gulnar. This she eventually does and they fall in love, spending one chaste night discussing their plans for marriage.

However, Banine has a suitor, Jamil, who through his connections gets her father released from prison. Mirza wants Banine to marry Jamil, as he can help him obtain a passport. She is too scared to tell her father about Andrey so agrees to marry Jamil, whom she cannot bear. She confides in Gulnar, but later wakes to find Gulnar has left with Andrey.

Banine marries Jamil – she is fifteen and he is thirty-five. They leave for Tiflis, where Jamil arranges Mirza's passport, then the Black Sea port of Batumi, from where Mirza sets sail for Istanbul. Again Banine feels the loss of being left behind.

Back in Baku, Gulnar returns to recriminations and huge family rows. Banine and Jamil eventually obtain passports and leave for Tiflis, Batumi, then Istanbul, where Jamil loses all their money playing poker. Banine leaves for Paris on the Orient Express, secretly delighted that Jamil has to stay behind, waiting for her father to arrive on business. In four days’ time she reaches the longed-for Paris.

== Social History ==
Banine's descriptions recreate the famous houses of the oil millionaires and the colour, atmosphere, customs and mores, national holidays and traditions of pre-revolutionary Baku. The novel describes the young author's relations with the surrounding world, her frame of mind and the opinions of her contemporaries and their attitudes towards events in that crucial period.

She describes the country house on the Absheron Peninsula and writes about the events, which had influence on her and her family's destiny. These include the Red Army’s arrival in Baku and the establishment of the Soviet government and further tragedies of the family which happened against that background. Particularly Banine writes that under her grandfather’s will she and her three elder sisters became millionaires. But after a few days, with the arrival of the Bolsheviks, those riches were gone.

Banine writes vividly about the atmosphere in their house, her paternal grandmother, German governess Fräulein Anna, and her father Mirza Asadullayev.

Banine describes the celebration of different holidays such as the spring new year Novruz bayram and the end of Ramadan month and how guests would get together in their house. She depicts Ashura in this way:

I also loved another religious observance—the annual commemoration of the tragedy at Karbala where in 680 Ali's son Hossein and all his family were massacred. This was the point of departure of Shiism, enemy of Sunnism, which my grandmother never failed to celebrate at home.

Banine makes several references to the ethnic clashes between Armenians and Azerbaijanis, senseless victims of both nations.

The collapse of the Azerbaijan Democratic Republic and other dramatic events are also described in the novel.

== Translations ==
Hamlet Qoca's Azerbaijani translation of the memoir (Qafqaz günləri),was published in Baku in 2006 and was itself translated into Russian by Gulshan Tofiq qizi. A translation from the original French into Russian by Ulviyya Akhundova (Кавказские дни) came out in Baku in 2016.
