= 1929 in literature =

This article contains information about the literary events and publications of 1929.

== Events ==
A scene from Tintin in the Land of the Soviets. Bolsheviks force people to vote for them at gunpoint, in a scene appropriated from Joseph Douillet's Moscou sans voiles (1928).

- January 10 – The Adventures of Tintin begin with the first appearance of Hergé's Belgian comic book hero in Tintin in the Land of the Soviets (Les Aventures de Tintin, reporter..., au pays des Soviets), serialized in the children's newspaper supplement Le Petit Vingtième.
- February–August – Voltaire's Candide (1759) is held to be obscene by the United States Customs Service in Boston.
- February – The first of Margery Allingham's crime novels to feature Albert Campion, The Crime at Black Dudley (U.S. title: The Black Dudley Murder), is published in the United Kingdom.
- March – Norah C. James's first novel, Sleeveless Errand, is held to be obscene on publication in London, for its portrayal of the city's bohemian life. An edition appears later in Paris from Jack Kahane's Obelisk Press.
- April 1 – The Faber and Faber publishing company is founded in London by Geoffrey Faber, with T. S. Eliot as its literary editor.
- April 29 – In the course of a domestic argument in London between poets and writers Robert Graves, Laura Riding, Geoffrey Phibbs and Graves's wife Nancy Nicholson, Riding and Graves jump from windows, she sustaining life-threatening injuries. Later this year, Graves and Riding go to live together in Mallorca.
- May – Hugo Gernsback first uses the term "science fiction" in its modern sense, for his pulp magazine Amazing Stories.
- c. June – The first of Gladys Mitchell's crime novels appears in the UK. Entitled Speedy Death, it introduces a psychologist detective character, Mrs Bradley.
- July – British publisher William Collins, Sons launches its Detective Story Club imprint with Edgar Wallace's novelization of The Terror.
- July 5 – Scotland Yard seizes 13 paintings of male and female nudes by D. H. Lawrence from a Mayfair, London, gallery on grounds of indecency, citing the Vagrancy Act 1838.
- August – The Censorship of Publications Act sets up the Censorship of Publications Board in the Irish Free State.
- August 15 – The first Ellery Queen mystery novel, The Roman Hat Mystery, is published in New York City.
- Mid year – Serialization begins of one of the first Thai novels – the first by a woman, M. L. Bubpha Kunjara Nimmanhemin writing as Dokmai Sot – entitled Sattru Khǫng Čhaolon (Her Enemy). Soon after comes the semi-autobiographical Lakhǫn Haeng Chiwit (The Circus of Life) of Prince Arkartdam-keung Rapheephat, writing as M. C. Akat. Several Thai writers join Kulap Saipradit in the Suphapburut literary group.
- October – Jean-Paul Sartre and Simone de Beauvoir become a couple, having met while he studied at the École Normale Supérieure in Paris. Twenty-one-year-old De Beauvoir becomes the youngest person ever to obtain an agrégation in philosophy, and comes second in the final examination, beaten only by Sartre.
- October 11 – Seán O'Casey's play The Silver Tassie, set in World War I, receives its première at the Apollo Theatre, London, directed by Raymond Massey. It stars Charles Laughton and Barry Fitzgerald, and has a set design by Augustus John. Rejected the year before by W. B. Yeats for the Abbey Theatre in Dublin, it will not open in Ireland until 1935.
- October 5 – The New York Society for the Suppression of Vice confiscates copies of Samuel Roth's pirated edition of James Joyce's 1922 novel Ulysses – the first complete edition printed in the U.S. He serves two prison terms for publishing an obscene work.
- October 29 – Released in the U.S. is the first sound film adaptation of a Shakespeare play: The Taming of the Shrew, starring Mary Pickford and her husband Douglas Fairbanks.
- December – George Orwell returns to England after a period living in Paris.
- unknown dates
  - Norwegian poet Herman Wildenvey, born Herman Portaas, and his wife, fiction writer Gisken Wildenvey, born Jonette Andreassen, formally adopt the joint surname Wildenvey.
  - Father Ronald Knox codifies the "rules" for the Golden Age of Detective Fiction in a "Decalogue" introducing The Best Detective Stories of 1928–1929.
  - The Adventures of Sherlock Holmes is banned in the Soviet Union due to the interest its author, Sir Arthur Conan Doyle, shows in the occult.
  - Foyles bookshop in London moves to larger premises in the Foyles Building, Charing Cross Road.
  - Monotype introduces Stanley Morison's revival of the Bembo typeface for book printing.

== New books ==
=== Fiction ===
- Richard Aldington – Death of a Hero
- Paul Alverdes – Die Pfeiferstube (The Whistler's Room)
- Roberto Arlt – Los siete locos (The Seven Madmen)
- Marcel Aymé – The Hollow Field
- Bibhutibhushan Bandyopadhyay – Pather Panchali (Song of the Road, book publication)
- Hamilton Basso – Relics and Angels
- Vicki Baum – Menschen im Hotel (People at a Hotel, translated as Grand Hotel)
- E. F. Benson – Paying Guests
- Anthony Berkeley
  - The Piccadilly Murder
  - The Poisoned Chocolates Case
- Georges Bernanos – Joy
- Algernon Blackwood – Dudley & Gilderoy: A Nonsense
- Mary Borden – The Forbidden Zone
- Elizabeth Bowen – The Last September
- Marjorie Bowen – Dickon
- Lynn Brock
  - The Dagwort Coombe Murder
  - The Mendip Mystery
- Mateiu Caragiale – Craii de Curtea-Veche
- Agatha Christie
  - The Seven Dials Mystery
  - Partners in Crime (short stories)
- Jean Cocteau – Les Enfants Terribles
- Colette – Sido
- J.J. Connington
  - The Eye in the Museum
  - Nemesis at Raynham Parva
- Miloš Crnjanski – Сеобе (Seobe, Migrations)
- Freeman Wills Crofts – The Box Office Murders
- Aleister Crowley – The Stratagem and other Stories
- Mazo de la Roche – Whiteoaks of Jalna
- Antoine de Saint-Exupéry – Courrier sud (Southern Mail)
- Alfred Döblin – Berlin Alexanderplatz
- Lloyd C. Douglas – Magnificent Obsession
- Arthur Conan Doyle – The Maracot Deep
- Pierre Drieu La Rochelle – Hotel Acropolis (Une Femme à sa fenêtre)
- M. Barnard Eldershaw – A House Is Built
- Susan Ertz – The Milky Way
- William Faulkner – The Sound and the Fury
- Edna Ferber – Cimarron
- C. S. Forester – Brown on Resolution
- Zona Gale – Borgia
- Rómulo Gallegos – Doña Bárbara
- Gaito Gazdanov – Вечер у Клэр (Vecher u Kler, An Evening with Claire)
- Floyd Gibbons – The Red Napoleon
- Anthony Gilbert
  - Death at Four Corners
  - The Mystery of the Open Window
- Jean Giono
  - Colline
  - Lovers are Never Losers
- Joseph Goebbels – Michael: A German Destiny in Diary Form (Michael: Ein deutsches Schicksal in Tagebuchblättern)
- George Goodchild – Jack O'Lantern
- Henry Green – Living
- Julien Green – The Dark Journey
- Graham Greene – The Man Within
- H. Rider Haggard – Mary of Marion Isle
- Dashiell Hammett
  - The Dain Curse
  - Red Harvest
- Ernest Hemingway – A Farewell to Arms
- Richard Hughes – A High Wind in Jamaica
- Masuji Ibuse (井伏 鱒二) – Salamander and Other Stories
- Ianthe Jerrold – The Studio Crime
- Frigyes Karinthy – Minden másképpen van (Everything Is Different, short stories)
- Anna Kavan – A Charmed Circle
- Takiji Kobayashi (小林 多喜二) – Kanikōsen (The Cannery Boat)
- Kwee Tek Hoay – Drama dari Krakatau (Drama of Krakatoa; serialization)
- Oliver La Farge – Laughing Boy
- Nella Larsen – Passing
- Sinclair Lewis – Dodsworth
- Eric Linklater – Poet's Pub
- Marie Belloc Lowndes – One of Those Ways
- Claude McKay – Banjo
- Frederic Manning (anonymously) – The Middle Parts of Fortune: Somme & Ancre, 1916 (subscription edition)
- Gladys Mitchell
  - The Mystery of a Butcher's Shop
  - Speedy Death
- Alberto Moravia – Gli indifferenti (Time of Indifference)
- W. F. Morris – Bretherton: Khaki or Field Grey?
- Leopold Myers – The Near and the Far
- Irène Némirovsky – David Golder
- Peadar O'Donnell – Adrigool
- Katherine Anne Porter – Flowering Judas
- Katharine Susannah Prichard - Coonardoo
- J. B. Priestley – The Good Companions
- Ellery Queen – The Roman Hat Mystery
- Erich Maria Remarque – All Quiet on the Western Front (Im Westen nichts Neues; book publication and first English translation)
- Henry Handel Richardson (Et Florence Robertson) – Ultima Thule (final part of The Fortunes of Richard Mahony)
- Ole Edvart Rølvaag – Peder Victorious (Peder Seier)
- Graham Seton – The W Plan
- Agnes Smedley – Daughter of Earth
- John Steinbeck – Cup of Gold: A Life of Sir Henry Morgan, Buccaneer, With Occasional Reference to History
- Cecil Street
  - The Davidson Case
  - The House on Tollard Ridge
- Jun'ichirō Tanizaki (谷崎 潤一郎) – Some Prefer Nettles (蓼喰う蟲)
- Josephine Tey – The Man in the Queue
- Wallace Thurman – The Blacker the Berry
- Sigrid Undset – In the Wilderness
- S. S. Van Dine – The Scarab Murder Case
- Henry Wade – The Duke of York's Steps
- Edgar Wallace
  - Four Square Jane
  - The Green Ribbon
  - The India-Rubber Men
- Lynd Ward – Gods' Man (wordless "novel in woodcuts")
- Edith Wharton – Hudson River Bracketed
- Thomas Wolfe – Look Homeward, Angel
- S. Fowler Wright
  - Dawn
  - The World Below
- Francis Brett Young – Black Roses

=== Children and young people ===
- Edgar Rice Burroughs – Tarzan and the Lost Empire
- Catherine Christian – The Luck of the Scallop Shell
- Josephine Elder – Evelyn Finds Herself
- Rachel Field – Hitty, Her First Hundred Years
- Erich Kästner – Emil and the Detectives (Emil und die Detektive)
- Eric P. Kelly – The Trumpeter of Krakow
- William Maxwell Reed – The Earth for Sam; the story of mountains, rivers, dinosaurs and men (non-fiction)
- Ruth Plumly Thompson – Jack Pumpkinhead of Oz (23rd in the Oz series overall and the ninth written by her)
- Alison Uttley – The Squirrel, The Hare and the Little Grey Rabbit (introducing Little Grey Rabbit)

=== Drama ===
- Jacinto Benavente – Vidas cruzadas (Short Cuts)
- Henri Bernstein – Mélo
- Bertolt Brecht – The Baden-Baden Lesson on Consent (Badener Lehrstück vom Einverständnis)
- Ferdinand Bruckner – Krankheit der Jugend (Illness of Youth)
- St. John Ervine – The First Mrs. Fraser
- Jean Giraudoux – Amphitryon 38
- Walter Hackett – Sorry You've Been Troubled
- Patrick Hamilton – Rope
- Denis Johnston – The Old Lady Says "No!"
- Agha Hashar Kashmiri – Rustom O Sohrab
- Frederick Lonsdale – Canaries Sometimes Sing
- A. A. Milne
  - Michael and Mary
  - Toad of Toad Hall (adapted from Kenneth Grahame)
- Kaj Munk – I Brændingen
- Eugene O'Neill – Dynamo
- Marcel Pagnol – Marius
- Stanisława Przybyszewska – The Danton Case (Sprawa Dantona)
- Ernest Raymond – The Berg
- Elmer Rice – Street Scene
- Arnold Ridley – Keepers of Youth
- George Bernard Shaw – The Apple Cart
- Ahmed Shawqi – Masraa' Kliyubatra (The Death of Cleopatra)
- John Van Druten – After All
- Ödön von Horváth – Rund um den Kongreß
- Edgar Wallace
  - The Calendar
  - Persons Unknown

=== Poetry ===
- Robinson Jeffers – Dear Judas and Other Poems
- W. B. Yeats – The Winding Stair

=== Non-fiction ===
- Ada Boni – Il talismano della felicità (The Talisman of Happiness)
- Aleister Crowley – Magick in Theory and Practice
- Mahatma Gandhi – The Story of My Experiments with Truth
- Robert Graves – Good-Bye to All That
- Walter Lippmann – A Preface to Morals
- A. A. Milne – Those Were the Days
- Tomas O'Crohan – An t-Oileánach (The Islandman)
- Charles Kay Ogden – Basic English
- Walter F. Otto – Die Götter Griechenlands (The Homeric Gods)
- Alice Prin – Kiki's Memoirs
- I. A. Richards – Practical Criticism
- Various authors – Our Exagmination Round His Factification for Incamination of Work in Progress: essays in support of James Joyce
- A. E. Waite – The Holy Kabbalah
- E. B. White and James Thurber – Is Sex Necessary?
- Alfred North Whitehead – Process and Reality
- Virginia Woolf – A Room of One's Own

== Births ==
- January 9
  - Brian Friel, Irish dramatist (died 2015)
  - Heiner Müller, German dramatist (died 1995)
- January 26 – Jules Feiffer, American cartoonist and writer (died 2025)
- February 6
  - Keith Waterhouse, English journalist and novelist (died 2009)
  - Valentin Yanin, Russian historian and author (died 2020)
- February 16 – Peter Porter, Australian-born English poet and educator (died 2010)
- February 17 – Chaim Potok, American author (died 2002)
- February 18 – Len Deighton, English thriller writer (died 2026)
- February 25 – Issa J. Boullata, Palestinian scholar and writer (died 2019)
- March 1 – Thuppettan, Malayalam-language Keralan playwright (died 2019)
- March 7 – Dan Jacobson, South African novelist (died 2014)
- March 13 – Mateja Matevski, Macedonian poet, literary and theater critic, essayist and translator (died 2018)
- March 18 – Christa Wolf, German literary critic, novelist and essayist (died 2011)
- March 19 – Miquel Martí i Pol, Catalan poet (died 2003)
- April 1 – Milan Kundera, Czech-French novelist (died 2023)
- April 2 – Catherine Gaskin, Irish-born Australian novelist (died 2009)
- April 9 – Paule Marshall, born Valenza Pauline Burke, American novelist (died 2019)
- April 23 – George Steiner, French-born literary critic and philosopher (died 2020)
- April 26 – Jerzy Turonek, Polish-Belarusian historian (died 2019)
- May 10
  - Sándor Kányádi, Hungarian poet and translator (died 2018)
  - Antonine Maillet, Acadian novelist, playwright, and scholar (died 2025)
- May 14 – George Selden, American author (died 1989)
- May 16 – Adrienne Rich, American poet and essayist (died 2012)
- June 2 – Norton Juster, American children's writer and academic (died 2021)
- June 11 – George Garrett, American poet and novelist (died 2008)
- June 12
  - Brigid Brophy, English novelist and critic (died 1995)
  - Anne Frank (Annelies Marie Frank), German-born Dutch child diarist (died 1945)
- June 18
  - Jürgen Habermas, German philosopher, social theorist and writer (died 2026)
  - Grigorijus Kanovičius, Lithuanian Jewish writer (died 2023)
- June 20 – Anne Weale, English writer (died 2007)
- June 25 – Eric Carle, American children's writer and illustrator (died 2021)
- June 29 – Oriana Fallaci, Italian journalist and author (died 2006)
- July 8
  - Shirley Ann Grau, American short story writer (died 2020)
  - A. T. Q. Stewart, Northern Irish historian and academic (died 2010)
- July 12 – Tayeb Salih, Sudanese fiction writer and cultural commentator (died 2009)
- July 22 – U. A. Fanthorpe, English poet (died 2009)
- July 27 – Jack Higgins (Harry Patterson), English thriller writer (died 2022)
- July 31 – Lynne Reid Banks, English novelist (died 2024)
- August 5 – Al Alvarez, English writer and poetry editor (died 2019)
- August 7 – Arrigo Petacco, Italian journalist and writer (died 2018)
- August 14 – Thomas Meehan, American screenwriter (died 2017)
- August 18 – Anatoly Kuznetsov, Russian dissident novelist (died 1979)
- August 21 – X. J. Kennedy, American poet, author, editor and translator (died 2026)
- August 27 – Ira Levin, American novelist and playwright (died 2007)
- August 29 – Thom Gunn, Anglo-American poet (died 2004)
- September 15 – John Julius Norwich, British historian and travel writer (died 2018)
- September 25 – Barbara Walters, American journalist (died 2022)
- September 30 – Leticia Ramos-Shahani, Filipino senator, writer (died 2017)
- October 7 – Robert Westall, English novelist and children's writer (died 1993)
- October 15 – Milorad Pavić, Serbian novelist (died 2009)
- October 21
  - Pierre Bellemare, French writer and radio personality (died 2018)
  - Ursula K. Le Guin, American science fiction and fantasy author (died 2018)
- October 23 – Shamsur Rahman, Bengali poet (died 2006)
- October 30 – Jean Chapman, English novelist
- November 6 – C. P. Taylor, Scottish playwright (died 1981)
- November 7 – Steve Carter, American playwright (died 2020)
- November 9 – Imre Kertész, Hungarian novelist, Holocaust survivor and Nobel laureate (died 2016)
- November 12 – Michael Ende, German novelist and children's writer (died 1995)
- November 13 – Theo Aronson, South African-born British biographer (died 2003)
- December 2 – Leon Litwack, American historian (died 2021)
- December 9 - Herbert Burkholz, American novelist and non-fiction author
- December 12 – John Osborne, English playwright and screenwriter (died 1994)
- December 16 – James Moore, English author (died 2017)
- December 17 – William Safire, born Safir, American columnist (died 2009)
- December 19 – Howard Sackler, American dramatist and screenwriter (died 1982)
- December 23 – Monique Watteau (Monique Dubois), Belgian fantasy novelist and artist
- December 24 – Philip Ziegler, English biographer and historian (died 2023)
- December 30 – Lucien Xavier Michel-Andrianarahinjaka, Malagasy writer, politician (died 1997)
- December 31 – Robert B. Silvers, American literary editor (died 2017)

== Deaths ==
- January — Anna Bowman Dodd, American author (born 1858)
- January 15 – Leonard Cline, American novelist, poet and journalist (heart failure, born 1893)
- January 29 – Hans Prutz, German historian (born 1843)
- February 6 – Charlotte Carmichael Stopes, Scottish writer and women's rights activist (born 1840)
- March 7 – Auguste Groner, Austrian detective fiction writer (born 1850)
- March 15 – Grace Rhys, Irish novelist and poet (born 1865)
- March 28 – Katharine Lee Bates, American lyricist (born 1859)
- March 31 – Santeri Nuorteva, Soviet journalist and politician (born 1881)
- April 12 – Flora Annie Steel, English writer (born 1847)
- April 16 – Sir John Morris-Jones, Welsh grammarian and poet (born 1864)
- April 21 – Lucy Clifford (Mrs. W. K. Clifford), English novelist, dramatist and screenwriter (born 1846)
- May 19 – Mary E. Mann, English novelist and short story writer (born 1848)
- June 8 – Bliss Carman, Canadian poet (born 1861)
- June 18 – Vedam Venkataraya Sastry, Sanskrit and Telugu poet, critic and dramatist (born 1853)
- June 22–Ellen Thorneycroft Fowler, English writer of romances and children's books (born 1860)
- June 25 – Georges Courteline, French dramatist and novelist (born 1858)
- June 28 – Edward Carpenter, English socialist poet and philosopher (born 1844)
- July 15 – Hugo von Hofmannsthal, Austrian novelist and poet (born 1874)
- July 31 – José de Castro, Portuguese journalist (born 1868)
- August – Mary MacLane, Canadian feminist writer (born 1881)
- September 11 – Rainis, Latvian poet and playwright (born 1865)
- September 19 – Francis Darwin, English botanist and academic (born 1848)
- October – Arno Holz, German Naturalist poet and dramatist (born 1863)
- October 8 – Max Lehmann, German historian (born 1845)
- October 19 – Alexandru Davila, Romanian dramatist and diplomat (born 1862)
- November 3 – Olav Aukrust, Norwegian poet and teacher (born 1883)
- November 29 – Dallas Lore Sharp, American nature writer (born 1870)
- December 10 – Harry Crosby, American publisher and poet (suicide; born 1898)
- unknown dates
  - Ella M. S. Marble, American physician (born 1850)
  - Evelyn Whitaker, English children's writer (born 1844)

== Awards ==
- James Tait Black Memorial Prize for fiction: J. B. Priestley, The Good Companions
- James Tait Black Memorial Prize for biography: Lord David Cecil, The Stricken Deer: or The Life of Cowper
- Newbery Medal for children's literature: Eric P. Kelly, The Trumpeter of Krakow
- Newdigate prize: Phyllis Hartnoll
- Nobel Prize in Literature: Thomas Mann
- O. Henry Award: Dorothy Parker, "Big Blonde" (short story)
- Pulitzer Prize for Drama: Elmer L. Rice, Street Scene
- Pulitzer Prize for Poetry: Stephen Vincent Benét, John Brown's Body
- Pulitzer Prize for the Novel: Julia Peterkin, Scarlet Sister Mary
