= The Riddle of the Roost =

1939 novel

- First edition
- Author: Lynn Brock
- Language: English
- Series: Sergeant Venn
- Genre: Detective
- Publisher: Collins Crime Club
- Publication date: 1939
- Publication place: United Kingdom
- Media type: Print
- Preceded by: Fourfingers

The Riddle of the Roost is a 1939 mystery detective novel by the Irish-born writer Lynn Brock. It was the third and last in his trilogy featuring the characters of Scotland Yard detective Sergeant Venn and Constable Kither. It was Brock's penultimate novel, followed the next year by The Stoat a final entry into the series of his best-known character Colonel Gore.

== Synopsis ==
In the picturesque settlement of Pinehill the peace and quiet is disturbed by the double murders of Winfred Dorbin and his twin brother Hector, at their country house. The local police and inhabitants suspect a simple-minded villager of the murder. Only the arrival of Sergeant Venn towards the end of the story brings some clarity.

== Bibliography ==
- Hubin, Allen J. Crime Fiction, 1749-1980: A Comprehensive Bibliography. Garland Publishing, 1984.
- Reilly, John M. Twentieth Century Crime & Mystery Writers. Springer, 2015.
