= Fabian strategy =

Military strategy favoring a war of attrition

The Fabian strategy is a military strategy where pitched battles and frontal assaults are avoided in favor of wearing down an opponent through a war of attrition and misdirection. While avoiding decisive battles, the side employing this strategy harasses its enemy through skirmishes to cause attrition, disrupt supply and affect morale. Employment of this strategy implies that the side adopting this strategy believes time is on its side, usually because the side employing the strategy is fighting in, or close to, their homeland and the enemy is far from home and by necessity has long and costly supply lines. It may also be adopted when no feasible alternative strategy can be devised.

By extension, the term is also applied to other situations in which a large, ambitious goal is seen as being out of reach by immediate action, but may be accomplished in small steps.

== Rome versus Carthage: The Second Punic War ==
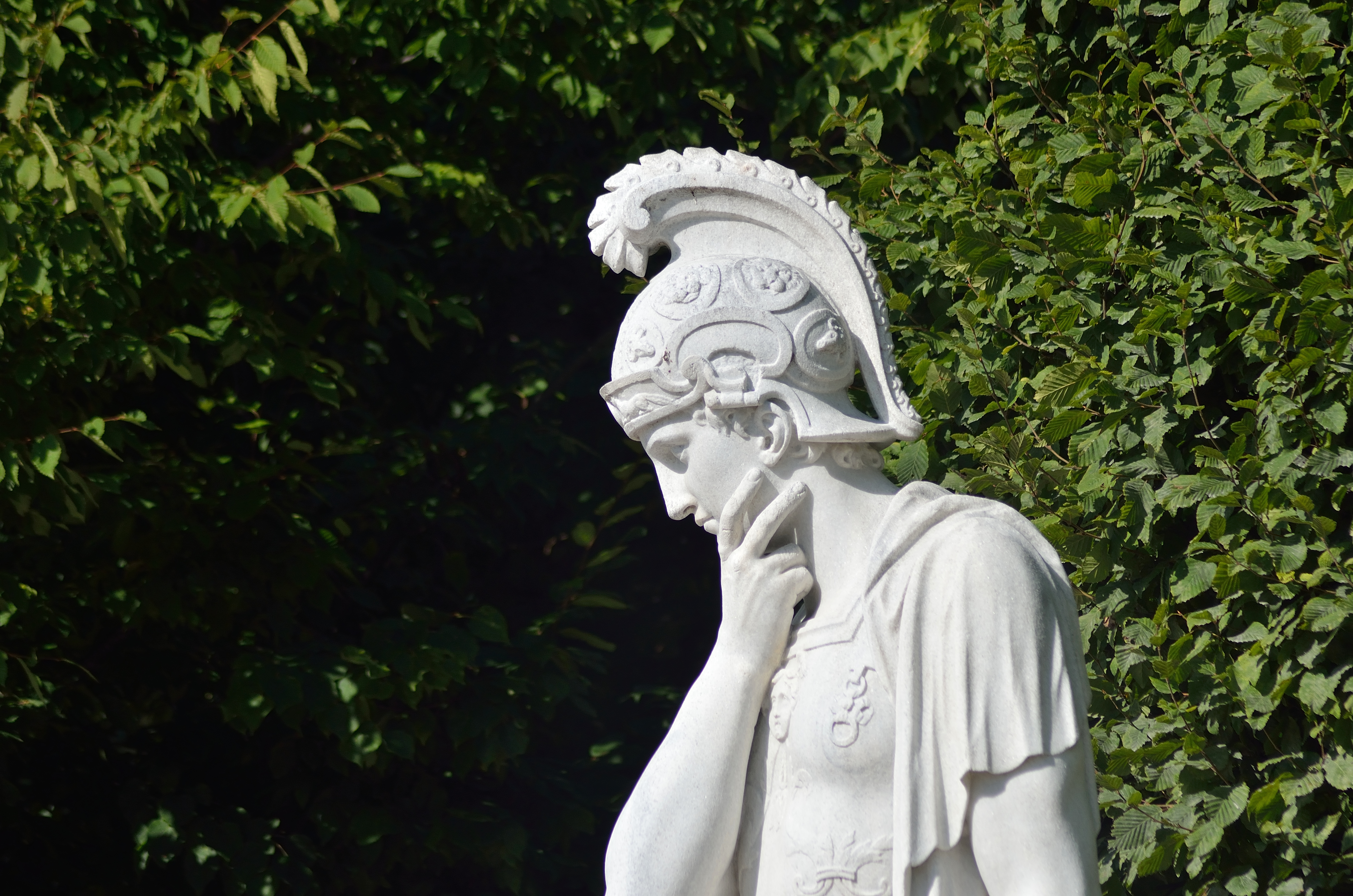
Statue of Quintus Fabius Maximus, the strategy's namesake

This strategy derives its name from Quintus Fabius Maximus Verrucosus, the dictator of the Roman Republic given the task of defeating the great Carthaginian general Hannibal in southern Italy during the Second Punic War (218–201 BC). At the start of the war, Hannibal boldly crossed the Alps and invaded Italy. Due to his skill as a general, Hannibal repeatedly inflicted devastating losses on the Romans—quickly achieving two crushing victories over Roman armies at Trebia in 218 BC and Lake Trasimene in 217 BC. After these disasters, the Romans gave full authority to Fabius Maximus as dictator. Fabius initiated a war of attrition, fought through constant skirmishes, limiting the ability of the Carthaginians to forage for food and denying them significant victories.

Hannibal was handicapped by being a commander of an invading foreign army (on Italian soil), and was effectively cut off from his home country in North Africa due to the difficulty of seaborne resupply over the Mediterranean Sea. As long as Rome's allies remained loyal, there was little he could do to win. Hannibal tried to convince the allies of Rome that it was more beneficial for them to side with Carthage (through a combination of victory and negotiation). Fabius calculated that, in order to defeat Hannibal, he had to avoid engaging him altogether (so as to deprive him of victories). He determined that Hannibal's overextended supply lines (as well as the cost of maintaining the Carthaginian army in the field) meant that Rome had time on its side.

Fabius avoided battle as a deliberate strategy. He sent out small military units to attack Hannibal's foraging parties while keeping the Roman army in hilly terrain to nullify Carthaginian cavalry superiority. Residents of small villages in the path of the Carthaginians were ordered by Fabius to burn their crops creating scorched earth and take refuge in fortified towns. Fabius used interior lines to ensure that Hannibal could not march directly on Rome without having to first abandon his Mediterranean ports (supply lines). At the same time, Fabius began to inflict constant, small, debilitating defeats on the Carthaginians. This, Fabius had concluded, would wear down the invaders' endurance and discourage Rome's allies from switching sides, without challenging the Carthaginians to major battles. Once the Carthaginians were sufficiently weakened and demoralized by lack of food and supplies, Fabius and his well-fed legions would then fight a decisive battle in the hope of crushing the Carthaginians once and for all.

Hannibal's second weakness was that much of his army was made up of Spanish mercenaries and Gaulish allies. Their loyalty to Hannibal was shallow; though they disliked Rome, they mainly desired quick battles and raids for plunder. They were unsuited for long sieges, and possessed neither the equipment nor the patience for such tactics. The tedium of countless small-skirmish defeats sapped their morale, causing them to desert.

With no main Roman army to attack, Hannibal's army became virtually no threat to Rome, which was a walled city that required a long siege to take. Fabius's strategy struck at the heart of Hannibal's weakness. Time, not major battles, would cripple Hannibal.

=== Political opposition ===
Fabius's strategy, though a military success and tolerable to wiser minds in the Roman Senate, was unpopular; the Romans had been long accustomed to facing and besting their enemies directly on the field of battle. The Fabian strategy was, in part, ruined because of a lack of unity in the command of the Roman army. The magister equitum, Marcus Minucius Rufus, a political enemy of Fabius, famously exclaiming:

Are we come here to see our allies butchered, and their property burned, as a spectacle to be enjoyed? And if we are not moved with shame on account of any others, are we not on account of these citizens... which now not the neighboring Samnite wastes with fire, but a Carthaginian foreigner, who has advanced even this far from the remotest limits of the world, through our dilatoriness and inactivity?

As the memory of the shock of Hannibal's victories grew dimmer, the Roman populace gradually started to question the wisdom of the Fabian strategy, the very thing which had given them time to recover. It was especially frustrating to the mass of the people, who were eager to see a quick conclusion to the war. Moreover, it was widely believed that if Hannibal continued plundering Italy unopposed, the allies, believing that Rome was incapable of protecting them, might defect to the Carthaginians.

Since Fabius won no large-scale victories, the Senate removed him from command in 216 BC. Their chosen replacement, Gaius Terentius Varro, led the Roman army into a debacle at the Battle of Cannae. The Romans, after experiencing this catastrophic defeat and losing countless other battles, had by this point learned their lesson. They utilized the strategies that Fabius had taught them, which, they finally realized, were the only feasible means of driving Hannibal from Italy.

This strategy of attrition earned Fabius the cognomen "Cunctator" (The Delayer).

== Later examples ==
Throughout history, the Fabian strategy has been employed all over the world.

During Antony's Atropatene campaign, the Parthians first destroyed the isolated baggage train and siege engines of the invaders. As Antony proceeded to lay siege on the Atropatenian capital, they began harassing the besiegers, forcing them to retreat.

The Empty Fort Strategy, also known as the Empty City Stratagem, was a military tactic used during the Hanzhong Campaign in 219 AD, one year before the fall of ancient China's Han dynasty, the warlord Liu Bei and his strategist Fa Zheng captured strategic locations from the forces of the rival warlord Cao Cao, resulting in the death of one of Cao Cao's top generals, Xiahou Yuan. Cao Cao attempted to recapture those locations but Liu Bei's forces refused to engage. It involved a defender, Liu Bei, creating an illusion of normalcy by exposing apparent vulnerabilities, such as leaving city gates open and displaying calm activity, to induce hesitation or retreat from a numerically superior enemy force.

Nearly a decade later, the Fabian strategy was used by Sima Yi as part of Zhuge Liang's Northern campaigns. Zhuge Liang's campaigns had some success but often lacked supplies to capitalise on gains. By the time of the fifth expedition (234 AD), Sima Yi maintained a defensive stance and did not engage Zhuge Liang's Shu troops. Zhuge Liang fell ill while trying to push through the defensive lines and died at the Wuzhang Plains that same year.

During the Roman campaign against Persia prosecuted by Julian in 363 AD, the main Persian army under Shapur II let the numerically superior Romans advance deep into their territory, avoiding a full-scale battle at the expense of the destruction of their fortresses. As the fortified Persian capital seemed impregnable, Julian was lured into Persia's interior, where the Persians employed scorched earth tactics. Shapur II's army appeared later and engaged in continuous skirmishes only after the starving Romans were in retreat, resulting in a disastrous Roman defeat.

The Fabian strategy was used by King Robert the Bruce in combination with scorched earth tactics in the First War of Scottish Independence against the English after the disastrous defeats at the Battle of Dunbar, Battle of Falkirk, and Battle of Methven. Eventually King Robert was able to regain the entire kingdom of Scotland which had been conquered by the English.

The strategy was used by the medieval French general Bertrand du Guesclin during the Hundred Years' War against the English following a series of disastrous defeats in pitched battles against Edward, the Black Prince. Eventually du Guesclin was able to recover most of the territory that had been lost.

During the Italian Wars, after a first defeat in pitched battle in Seminara, Spanish general Gonzalo Fernández de Córdoba used Fabian tactics to retake southern Italy from Charles VIII of France's army, compelling the French to withdraw after the Siege of Atella. Despite his success, he took to reform his army in pike and shot manner.

While often aggressive, King Frederick the Great occasionally employed Fabian principles during campaigns against numerically superior forces, utilizing strategic withdrawal and delay to exhaust opponents before initiating significant battles of the Silesian conquest and Seven Years’ War.

During the American Revolutionary War, George Washington utilized the Fabian strategy against British forces, which led him to be nicknamed the "American Fabius". Though Washington initially planned to gain a major victory over the British in a pitched battle, the American defeat at Long Island in 1776 led him to adopt the Fabian strategy. The Continental Army under Washington suffered further defeats at Brandywine and Germantown in 1777, which led John Adams to declare: "I am sick of Fabian systems in all quarters." Following the inconclusive 1778 Battle of Monmouth, Washington did not command any major battles until the 1781 siege of Yorktown, a decisive victory that resulted in American independence. Nathanael Greene also successfully used the Fabian strategy in the war's Southern theater.

Prince Michael Andreas Barclay de Tolly's war plan used against Napoleon's Grande Armée in combination with scorched earth and guerrilla war proved decisive in defeating the French invasion of Russia. Prince Mikhail Illarionovich Golenishchev-Kutuzov-Smolensky was nicknamed "the Russian Fabius" for his involvement with a series of military doctrines aimed at systematically diminishing the French army. After Ligny, Field Marshal Gebhard Leberecht von Blücher ordered the Prussian army to military mobilize withdraw north to Wavre instead of retreating along lines directly to Prussia. This allowed them to preserve subsequent advances that were crucial in linking with Wellington’s coalition forces, The strategy effectively integrated strategic patience, tactical delay, and operational coordination to transform a temporary tactical setback into the decisive outcome of the Battle of Waterloo.

Sam Houston effectively employed a Fabian defense in the aftermath of the Battle of the Alamo, using delaying tactics and small-unit harrying against Santa Anna's much larger force, to give time for the Army of Texas to grow into a viable fighting force. When he finally met Santa Anna at San Jacinto, the resulting victory ensured the establishment of the Republic of Texas. Winfield Scott during the Mexican–American War, who sometimes relied on delaying strategies to conserve his forces.

During the American Civil War, Joseph E. Johnston was one of the few generals of the Confederate States of America to repeatedly feign retreat. Joseph exemplified the principles of the Fabian tactic by emphasizing defensive maneuvers, fortifications, and calculated withdrawals to trade space for time. His goal was not to achieve immediate decisive victories but to preserve the army and impose attrition on his Union adversaries, a method ultimately constrained by political pressure and the demands of Confederate leaders such as Jefferson Davis. While his contemporaries often viewed this as excessive caution, modern scholars recognize the strategic logic behind Johnston's approach in the challenging military context of the war. Some historians note that Robert E. Lee and Thomas “Stonewall” Jackson, exhibited a strategic style that shares certain conceptual elements with the Fabian strategy, though their application was not identical to the classic Fabian approach of protracted attrition. While theoretically possible, adopting a guerrilla warfare of attrition was impractical for general Lee and the Confederacy. This meant that Lee's chosen offensive, Napoleonic-influenced strategy, was consistent with both his operational training and the tactical realities of the Eastern Theater in Appalachia. Historians argue that retreat-and-delay tactics might have delayed Union gains locally, but could not realistically have achieved decisive Confederate victory, given the broader political and strategic environment.

Although President De Wet was not a strict follower of classic Roman Fabian doctrine, his prudent use of protracted, evasive, and attritional tactics is widely acknowledged as the Kommandos equivalent of Fabian-style warfare. Historians distinguish him from contemporaries like Jan Smuts, noting that while Smuts refined and occasionally improved upon such tactics, De Wet was one of the first to effectively implement a sustained strategy of delay and attrition against a more powerful invading force of the Empire.

General Kuropatkin’s adherence to a Fabian-like, cautious strategy led to repeated Russian defeats at Liaoyang and Mukden, as his postponement of battles allowed the Japanese to consolidate and force the conflict on their terms. Historians attribute Russian failures both to Kuropatkin’s indecisiveness in implementing offensive operations and to systemic problems in logistics, staff coordination, and troop training. Although theoretically sound in leveraging space-for-time and attrition principles, his implementation was hampered by poor timing, communication delays, and lack of aggressive coordination, resulting in an overall strategic failure in Russo-Japanese War.

During the First World War in German East Africa, Generals Paul von Lettow-Vorbeck and Jan Smuts both used the Fabian strategy in their campaigns. T. E. Lawrence implementation of modern guerrilla tactics, akin to a contemporary Fabian strategy, involved utilizing mobility, topographical familiarity, preemptive strikes, and indigenous Arabs rebel backing to disrupt Ottoman logistical networks, communications in accordance with Clausewitzian principles, and asymmetric engagement.

Mao Zedong’s “Active Defense”, is a military doctrine adapted from the Fabian concept within the context of modern warfare. His “active defense” involved strategic retreats, harassing the KMT in small engagements, and avoiding decisive battles until conditions favored the Red Army. Mao’s 16-character principal, “The enemy advances, we retreat; the enemy camps, we harass; the enemy tires, we attack; the enemy retreats, we pursue”—echoes Fabius’s philosophy. Later reforms in China, extending from Mao to Xi Jinping, continued refining this strategy toward joint operations and regional defensive-offensive postures.

During the First Indochina War, the Viet Minh under the general Võ Nguyên Giáp, nickname "Red Napoleon", effectively employed used the strategy by way of delaying and hit-and-run tactics, as well as scorched-earth strategy, against the better-equipped French forces, which prolonged the war and caused both the French high command and home front to grow weary of the fighting, ending with the decisive Vietnamese victory at Dien Bien Phu. The Viet Cong and the PAVN would later use this strategy against the American and ARVN forces during the Vietnam War. Dau tranh is a comprehensive Vietnamese revolutionary plan combining military and political struggle to achieve both Fabian-influence tactical and ideological objectives.

During the Iraq War, analysts propose that certain aspects of the U.S.-led counterinsurgency campaign exhibited characteristics aligned with Fabian strategies. Confronted with a decentralized insurgency, U.S. forces frequently utilized strategic containment, restricted engagements, and attrition-oriented operations, with the objective of enduring insurgent activities while mitigating significant losses. Instead of engaging Iraq in immediate, large-scale ground battles, the precision air campaign harassed and isolated Iraqi forces, reducing their operational cohesion and morale. The Coalition’s air strategy, leveraging AirLand Battle Doctrine, gradually degraded Iraqi command, control, and supply systems. Military scholars have documented how the U.S. endeavored to reconcile the application of force with political and public acceptance, acknowledging that protracted conflict could exert pressure on adversaries while simultaneously limiting domestic support.

There are some indications that the Ukrainian strategy in the Russo-Ukrainian crisis has been a war of attrition. Russian troops held a tactically similar position throughout the 2023 Ukrainian counteroffensive.

Members of the Axis of Resistance have employed the strategy. Military scholar Amos C. Fox argues that Hamas has employed a Fabian strategy during the Gaza War, relying on attrition and avoiding direct, decisive engagements with the Israeli military. Analysts have characterized Hezbollah's long-term approach to Israel as a Fabian-like strategy, emphasizing prolonged attrition, avoidance of full-scale war, and the preservation of its forces while imposing sustained costs on its adversary.

== Fabian socialism ==
Fabian socialism, the ideology of the Fabian Society (founded in 1884), significantly influenced the Labour Party in the United Kingdom. It utilises the same strategy of a "war of attrition" to facilitate the society's aim to bring about a socialist state. The advocation of gradualism distinguished this brand of socialism from those who favour revolutionary action.

== See also ==
- Battle of annihilation
- Fleet in being
- Guerrilla warfare
- Jominian doctrine
- Retreating defensive action
