= The Silver Sickle Case =

1938 novel

- First edition
- Author: Lynn Brock
- Language: English
- Series: Sergeant Venn
- Genre: Detective
- Publisher: Collins Crime Club
- Publication date: 1938
- Publication place: United Kingdom
- Media type: Print
- Followed by: Fourfingers

The Silver Sickle Case is a 1938 detective novel by the Irish-born writer Lynn Brock. Best known for his Colonel Gore series of mysteries, the novel introduced an alternative detective character Sergeant Venn of Scotland Yard assisted by Detective Constable Kither. It was followed by two sequels.

== Synopsis ==
Two murders take place in the seaside resort town of Southmouth near the New Forest: the first is a former army officer beaten to death and left by a rubbish tip while the second, found near by, is impossible to identify. Investigating police officers conclude that both crimes are connected to a fashionable night club The Silver Sickle.

== Bibliography ==
- Hubin, Allen J. Crime Fiction, 1749-1980: A Comprehensive Bibliography. Garland Publishing, 1984.
- Reilly, John M. Twentieth Century Crime & Mystery Writers. Springer, 2015.
