= Nightmare (Brock novel) =

1932 novel

- First Edition (UK)
- Author: Lynn Brock
- Language: English
- Genre: Thriller
- Publisher: Collins Crime Club
- Publication date: 1932
- Publication place: United Kingdom
- Media type: Print

Nightmare is a 1932 thriller novel by the Irish-born writer Lynn Brock. It is an inverted detective story, and a stand alone work for an author best known for his series featuring the Golden Age detective Colonel Gore.

== Synopsis ==
Following a nervous breakdown, a struggling young novelist reaches the end of his tether. He sets out to murder those tormenting him.

== Bibliography ==
- Hubin, Allen J. Crime Fiction, 1749-1980: A Comprehensive Bibliography. Garland Publishing, 1984.
- Reilly, John M. Twentieth Century Crime & Mystery Writers. Springer, 2015.
