= Q.E.D. (novel) =

1930 novel

- First edition (UK)
- Author: Lynn Brock
- Language: English
- Series: Colonel Gore
- Genre: Detective
- Publisher: Collins (UK); Harper (US)
- Publication date: 1930
- Publication place: United Kingdom
- Media type: Print
- Preceded by: The Mendip Mystery
- Followed by: The Stoat

Q.E.D. is a 1930 mystery detective novel by the Irish-born writer Lynn Brock. It was the sixth of seven novels in his series featuring the character of Colonel Wyckham Gore, one of the most prominent investigators during the early stages of the Golden Age of Detective Fiction. It was published in the Under States with the alternative title of Murder on the Bridge.

== Synopsis ==
Gore is called upon to the solve the seemingly motiveless murder of Doctor Melhuish the husband of his former youthful flame. After being called out urgently on a foggy night by one of his patients, the doctor has disappeared somewhere across a suspension bridge spanning a wide gorge. Adding to the mystery, shortly before his death Melhuish had begun writing a letter to Gore.

== Bibliography ==
- Athill, Robin. Mendip, a New Study. David and Charles, 1976.
- Reilly, John M. Twentieth Century Crime & Mystery Writers. Springer, 2015.
