= Red Napoleon =

Nickname for several communist generals

Red Napoleon was a nickname for a number of communist generals. The term was popularized in the 1920s by speculation among White Russian émigrés that one of the Soviet Union's top generals might overthrow the government in a coup. The term gained further currency in Western media as some observers worried that after such a coup, the "Red Napoleon" would lead an invasion of the rest of Europe. In later decades, it continued to be used occasionally to describe particularly capable communist generals, such as Mikhail Tukhachevsky and Võ Nguyên Giáp.

== Background ==
At the time of the Russian Revolution, the history of the French Revolution was widely known across the Western world. Contemporaries therefore often used the events of the French Revolution to help them understand developments in Russia. Because Napoleon Bonaparte ended the first French Republic by taking power in a coup, historian Douglas Greene argues that "the specter of Bonaparte haunted 1917." Many politicians and generals (such as Alexander Kerensky and Lavr Kornilov) were accused of being "Bonapartist", or of attempting to follow in Napoleon's footsteps. However, no such figure successfully seized or consolidated power. After the Bolsheviks seized power in November, they feared that they would be overthrown by a Russian Bonaparte. In part to minimize this risk, they excluded "kulaks" from the Red Army, who they believed to be the Russian equivalent of the social class that had supported Napoleon. Socialists who opposed the Bolsheviks, in Russia and elsewhere, accused the Bolshevik regime itself of Bonapartism.

In Hungary, where the Hungarian Revolution was underway, the "Red Napoleon" moniker was applied to József Pogány, although with a different meaning than in later usage. Pogány had written a play about Napoleon, and his aggressive and abrasive personal style led his opponents to coin the nickname as an insult. The nickname was picked up by anti-Communist groups in the United States after Pogány emigrated there.

== Popularization of the term ==
White émigrés brought the historical analogy of the French Revolution with them when they fled to western Europe and the United States. Although most agreed that a "Russian Thermidor" was likely, there was little agreement over whether this would be followed by a Russian Napoleon (or whether that would be desirable). Initial speculation focused on the leader of the Red Army, Leon Trotsky. Like Napoleon, Trotsky was popular, charismatic, and a good military commander, but unlike Napoleon he refused to use his control of the Red Army to stage a coup. Instead, the troika of Stalin, Kamenev, and Zinoviev managed to oust him from his party positions and force him into exile. Nonetheless, the rumors that Trotsky wanted to become a Russian Bonaparte helped the troika to discredit him.

After Stalin moved to end the NEP and collectivize agriculture, a Russian Thermidor no longer appeared likely. Many Russian émigrés lost interest in the French Revolution as a historical analogy until the idea was revived in the later half of the thirties. Historian David Lockwood argues that in order to strengthen their military hierarchy, the USSR was forced to periodically raise the status of skilled military leaders, despite the political leadership's wariness of military independence. This led a series of military leaders to feature prominently in the Soviet press, and thence to become objects of speculation abroad over their prospects of becoming a "Red Napoleon". Mikhail Tukhachevsky was considered the prime candidate, but Vasily Blyukher and Semyon Budyonny were subject to similar speculation. The hopes of White émigrés were further encouraged by the Soviet secret police themselves, who spread rumors among the émigrés that leading Soviet generals were planning a coup. This helped the Soviet police to entrap Whites who were interested in joining such plots.

While the possibility of a "Red Napoleon" was a hopeful one to many Russian émigrés, it stoked fears of a Russian conquest of Europe among some Westerners. In 1929, Floyd Gibbons wrote The Red Napoleon, describing a possible future where Stalin dies and is replaced by a bellicose Soviet general. The general then leads the USSR on a conquest of Europe featuring "race-mixing" (adding fears of "yellow peril" to fears of communism).

== Later uses ==
When the Chinese Civil War sparked interest in the military endurance of the Chinese Communists, Western outlets gave Zhu De the title of "Red Napoleon of China". After Stalin's death, some Western media outlets speculated that Georgy Zhukov might become a Red Napoleon until he was sidelined in the post-Stalin leadership struggles. Võ Nguyên Giáp, a leading general for North Vietnam, was also given the nickname. However, in his case it was without the political implications, and simply reflected respect for his extraordinary military ability.
