= The Kink (novel) =

1927 novel

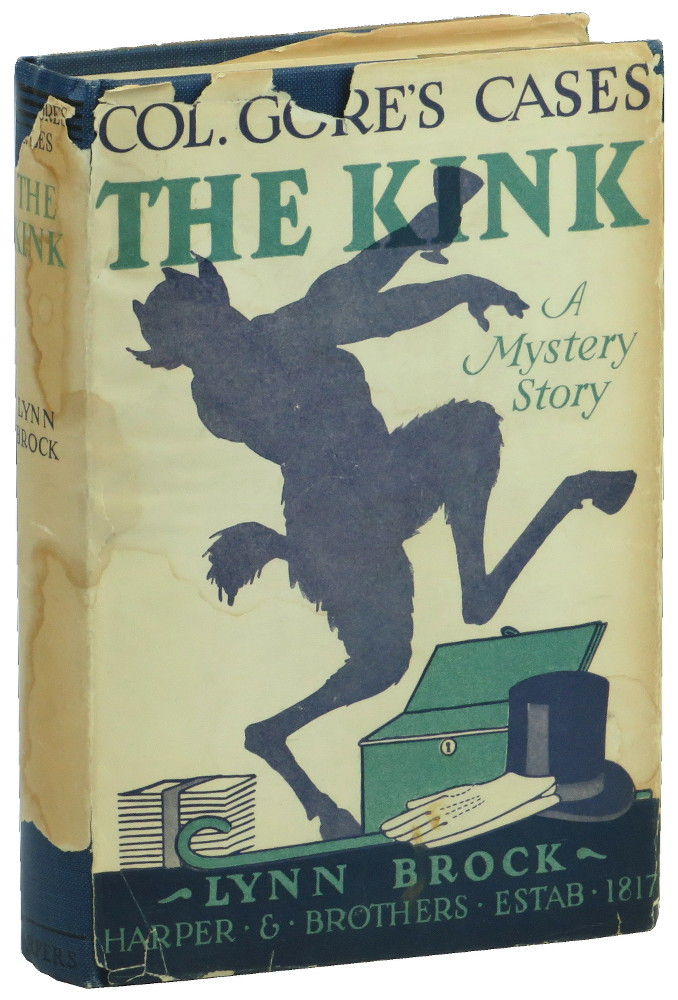
- First edition (US)
- Author: Lynn Brock
- Language: English
- Series: Colonel Gore
- Genre: Mystery thriller
- Publisher: William Collins, Sons (UK); Harper & Brothers (US)
- Publication date: 1927
- Publication place: United Kingdom
- Media type: Print
- Preceded by: Colonel Gore’s Second Case
- Followed by: The Slip-Carriage Mystery

The Kink is a 1927 mystery detective novel by the Irish-born writer Lynn Brock. It was the third novel in his series featuring the character of Colonel Wyckham Gore, one of many investigators active during the Golden Age of Detective Fiction. It is sometimes referred to as Colonel Gore’s Third Case. The novel is noted for being comparatively sexually explicit for the era. Dashiell Hammett wrote a contemporary negative review of the book in The Saturday Review.

== Synopsis ==
Gore is engaged to recover some missing documents, and his search takes him to the country estate of the politician Lord Haviland in Surrey. Here he encounters the debauched lifestyle of Haviland and his family, said to be the result of a kink in the family's bloodline. The resolute Gore ploughs on with his case against a backdrop of pornographic films and orgies.

== Bibliography ==
- Keating, Henry Reymond Fitzwalter. Whodunit?: A Guide to Crime, Suspense, and Spy Fiction. Van Nostrand Reinhold Company, 1982.
- Reilly, John M. Twentieth Century Crime & Mystery Writers. Springer, 2015.
