= The W Plan =

1930 film

- Theatrical poster
- Directed by: Victor Saville; Marjorie Gaffney
- Screenplay by: Victor Saville; Miles Malleson; Frank Launder
- Based on: the novel, The W Plan by Graham Seton
- Produced by: Victor Saville
- Starring: Brian Aherne; Madeleine Carroll; Gibb McLaughlin; Gordon Harker
- Cinematography: René Guissart; Freddie Young
- Edited by: Maclean Rogers
- Music by: John Reynders
- Production companies: British International Pictures; Elstree Studios
- Distributed by: Wardour Films (United Kingdom); RKO Radio Pictures (USA)
- Release dates: 15 June 1930 (United Kingdom); 15 March 1931 (US)
- Running time: 87–105 minutes
- Country: United Kingdom
- Language: English
- Budget: $125,000
- Box office: $300,000

The W Plan is a 1930 British spy film produced and directed by Victor Saville and starring Brian Aherne, Madeleine Carroll, Gibb McLaughlin, and Gordon Harker. The screenplay was written by Saville with Miles Malleson and Frank Launder, based on the 1929 novel of the same name by Graham Seton.

== Plot ==
Colonel Duncan Grant is a British officer during World War I. When the British high command get wind of a German plan, titled The W Plan, from the lips of a dying German officer, Major Ulrich Muller, they send Grant behind enemy lines to learn the details. After successfully being dropped by airplane near the German town of Essen, where he makes his way to home of the dead German who was responsible for the plan. Grant is chosen because he speaks fluent German, having spent a significant amount of time in Germany prior to outbreak of hostilities. While in Essen, he runs into an old girlfriend, Rose Hartmann. When he and Rose go to a nearby café, he is approached by German officers and asked for his papers. While he has the documents taken from Muller, the Germans become suspicious, and Grant has to make a quick getaway. Unfortunately, the plane he is supposed to meet with to make his escape is shot down, after which Grant is arrested for desertion.

When he is about to be shot, he is instead sent to the very project he had been sent to Germany to learn about, The W Plan. It consists of a very elaborate series of underground works which are being dug beneath the British controlled territory, in order to collapse their lines. Grant succeeds in destroying a vital portion of the German underpinnings, and makes his escape back to British territory. The film ends with the allusion that he will meet up with Rose in Switzerland in the coming days.

== Cast ==
- Brian Aherne as Colonel Duncan Grant
- George Merritt as Major Ulrich Muller
- C. M. Hallard as Commander in Chief
- Frederick Lloyd as Colonel Jervois
- B. Gregory as Flight Commander Mayne
- Mary Jerrold as Frau Muller
- Madeleine Carroll as Rosa Hartmann
- Clifford Heatherley as Café proprietor
- Austin Trevor as Captain of military police
- Norah Howard as Lady of the town
- Cameron Carr as Private Otto Goddern
- Milton Rosmer as President of the court martial
- Alfred Drayton as Prosecuting counsel
- Charles Paton as Defending counsel
- Wilhelm Koenig as prison commandant
- Gordon Harker as Private Waller
- Gibb McLaughlin as Private 'Ginger' McTavish

(Cast list as per BFI database)

== Reception ==
Film Weekly wrote: "The main fault to be found with the film is that it is a little slow. The acting is first rate. Brian Aherne gives a most convincing portrayal of the British spy. Both as the English officer and in his German guise he is effective. It is an excellent piece of work. Madeleine Carroll is the heroine. She has very little to do, but she does it well. The supporting cast is excellent. A film you can enjoy."

Kine Weekly wrote: "The story, robbed of the fine descriptive work of the author, appears rather incredible, and results in the picture not comparing too favourably with the fine authentic war pictures shown recently, but what the picture lacks in purpose and authenticity it makes up in action, suspense and thrills. ... Victor Saville has worked tremendously hard and has spared no expense to bring life and realism to the story, but his imagination, initiative and stagecraft hardly compensate for the fine descriptive writing of the author, which enveloped the novel with an atmosphere of realism which skilfully concealed the incredibilities. "

Mordaunt Hall of The New York Times gave it a positive review, applauding the acting of Aherne and Madeleine Carroll, and calling the picture, "... an exciting and splendidly staged English espionage melodrama," and the "... most satisfactory production sent over here from the Elstree Studios."

Variety wrote: "Story had everything, and it's easy to understand that the novel had a wide play among British readers which should help the film in the British Isles. The novel also has been advertised in the U.S. The picture, however, lacks b.o. punch for this side. But as a trailer for the original book it's priceless. That order should have been reversed."
