= Fourfingers =

1939 novel

- First edition
- Author: Lynn Brock
- Language: English
- Series: Sergeant Venn
- Genre: Detective
- Publisher: Collins Crime Club
- Publication date: 1939
- Publication place: United Kingdom
- Media type: Print
- Preceded by: The Silver Sickle Case
- Followed by: The Riddle of the Roost

Fourfingers is a 1939 mystery detective novel by the Irish-born writer Lynn Brock. It was the second in his trilogy featuring the characters of Scotland Yard detective Sergeant Venn and Constable Kither. Writing in the Times Literary Supplement, reviewer Maurice Percy Ashley observed "Mr. Lynn Brock’s new book, Fourfingers, good though it is, is so closely written and so full of incident that it is a little heavy going for the reader in search of intellectual relaxation."

== Synopsis ==
The body of celebrated author Carla Waterlow is found in a car on Marton Common, an expanse of heathland in the New Forest. She has been shot through the heart on a lonely stretch of road. Before long two other bodies are discovered nearby. Venner and Kither are despatched from London to lead the investigation. The case grows more complex as they follow up several leads, but appears to revolve around the fingerprints left on a gold cigarette case in Waterlow's car by an unknown figure.

== Bibliography ==
- Hubin, Allen J. Crime Fiction, 1749-1980: A Comprehensive Bibliography. Garland Publishing, 1984.
- Reilly, John M. Twentieth Century Crime & Mystery Writers. Springer, 2015.
