= The Deductions of Colonel Gore =

1924 novel

- First edition (UK)
- Author: Lynn Brock
- Language: English
- Series: Colonel Gore
- Genre: Detective
- Publisher: William Collins, Sons (UK); Harper & Brothers (US)
- Publication date: 1924
- Publication place: United Kingdom
- Media type: Print
- Followed by: Colonel Gore’s Second Case

The Deductions of Colonel Gore is a 1924 detective novel by the Irish-born writer Lynn Brock. It was the first in his series of seven novels featuring the character of Colonel Wyckham Gore. Gore enjoyed popularity during the early stages of the Golden Age of Detective Fiction. It was also published under the alternative title The Barrington Mystery.

== Synopsis ==
Colonel Gore gives a Masai knife as a wedding present to Barbara Lethbridge. When he returns to England the following year he finds she stands accused or murder, as the knife has been plunged into a blackmailer Barrington with whom she is involved. Against his better instincts Gore takes on the role of amateur detective in order to clear her name.

== Bibliography ==
- Reilly, John M. Twentieth Century Crime & Mystery Writers. Springer, 2015.
