= The Slip-Carriage Mystery =

1928 novel

- First edition (UK)
- Author: Lynn Brock
- Language: English
- Series: Colonel Gore
- Genre: Mystery thriller
- Publisher: William Collins, Sons; Harper & Brothers (US)
- Publication date: 1928
- Publication place: United Kingdom
- Media type: Print
- Preceded by: The Kink
- Followed by: The Mendip Mystery

The Slip-Carriage Mystery is a 1928 mystery detective novel by the Irish-born writer Lynn Brock. It was the fourth novel in his series featuring the character of Colonel Wyckham Gore. The previous novels in the series established Gore a popular character during the early stages of the Golden Age of Detective Fiction. A review in the Times Literary Supplement observed "The multiplication of false leads at the beginning is carried a little too far, and the story is at its best when the movement is greatest as it approaches and reaches its end".

== Synopsis ==
Sir William Ireland, a wealthy coal mine owner is found stabbed to death in his private compartment, a slip-carriage, one October night. Around a year later the Home Office call in private detective Colonel Gore to examine the case, with several key suspects including Ireland's wife, her lover and the estate manager all having motives for killing the businessman.

== Bibliography ==
- Reilly, John M. Twentieth Century Crime & Mystery Writers. Springer, 2015.
