= The W Plan (novel) =

1929 novel

- Author: Graham Seton
- Language: English
- Series: Duncan Grant
- Genre: War thriller
- Publisher: Thornton Butterworth
- Publication date: 1929
- Publication place: United Kingdom
- Media type: Print

The W Plan is a 1929 war thriller novel by the British author Graham Seton. It takes place during the First World War when British Colonel Duncan Grant uncovers a secret German plan to achieve victory on the Western Front. It was first published in serial form in the Evening Standard in 1929. Before publication as a novel D.H. Lawrence proofread it, although he was later dismissive of the work. It received a more positive reception by The Spectator and Arthur Conan Doyle. In 1941 during the Second World War he published a sequel The V Plan.

== Film adaptation ==
In 1930 it was adapted into the British film of the same title. Produced by British International Pictures it was directed by Victor Saville and starred Brian Aherne, Madeleine Carroll and Gordon Harker.

== Bibliography ==
- Bowd, Graham. Fascist Scotland. Birlinn, 2013.
- Goble, Alan. The Complete Index to Literary Sources in Film. Walter de Gruyter, 1999.
- Onions, Graham. English Fiction and Drama of the Great War, 1918–39. Springer, 1990.
