= The Lonely House =

1920 novel

- American first edition
- Author: Marie Belloc Lowndes
- Language: English
- Series: Hercules Popeau
- Genre: Mystery detective
- Publisher: Hutchinson; Doran (US)
- Publication date: 1920
- Publication place: United Kingdom
- Media type: Print

The Lonely House is a 1920 mystery detective novel by the British author Marie Belloc Lowndes. It features the French police detective Hercules Popeau, a near exact contemporary creation as Agatha Christie's Belgian private detective Hercule Poirot. It initiated a dispute between the two authors with Lowndes claiming that Christie had effectively stolen her character and complained to the Society of Authors. In 1924 Lowndes adapted it for the stage, and it premiered in Eastbourne. Hercules Popeau appeared in several short stories and another novel One of Those Ways, but never enjoyed the same levels of popularity as Poirot.

== Synopsis ==
Lily Fairfied, an heiress, goes to stay with her aunt at a house in Monte Carlo. She finds the family impoverished and when a body is discovered nearby, she turns to Hercules Popeau for assistance.

== Bibliography ==
- Edwards, Martin. The Life of Crime: Detecting the History of Mysteries and their Creators. HarperCollins UK, 2022.
- Nicoll, Allardyce. English Drama, 1900-1930: The Beginnings of the Modern Period, Volume 2. Jones & Bartlett Learning, 2009.
- Reilly, John M. Twentieth Century Crime & Mystery Writers. Springer, 2015.
- Warkentin, Elyssa (ed.) The Lodger by Marie Belloc Lowndes. Cambridge Scholars Publishing, 2015.
- Vinson, James. Twentieth-Century Romance and Gothic Writers. Macmillan, 1982.
