= Colonel Gore's Second Case =

1925 novel

Colonel Gore’s Second Case
- 1928 edition
- Author: Lynn Brock
- Language: English
- Series: Colonel Gore
- Genre: Detective
- Publisher: William Collins, Sons; Harper & Brothers (US)
- Publication date: 1925
- Publication place: United Kingdom
- Media type: Print
- Preceded by: The Deductions of Colonel Gore
- Followed by: The Kink

Colonel Gore’s Second Case is a 1925 detective novel by the Irish writer Lynn Brock. It was the second in his series of seven novels featuring the character of Colonel Wyckham Gore. Gore enjoyed popularity during the early stages of the Golden Age of Detective Fiction. After solving his first case Gore now establishes his own detective agency.

== Synopsis ==
At a golf club in the West Country, several murders and attempted murders take place. Gore leads the investigation into the crimes but he himself comes under attack.

== Bibliography ==
- Herbert, Rosemary. Whodunit?: A Who's Who in Crime & Mystery Writing. Oxford University Press, 2003.
- Reilly, John M. Twentieth Century Crime & Mystery Writers. Springer, 2015.
- Turnbull, Malcolm J. Victims Or Villains: Jewish Images in Classic English Detective Fiction. Popular Press, 1998.
