= Tactics of the Iraqi insurgency =

The tactics of the Iraqi insurgency have varied widely. Insurgents have targeted U.S. forces and Iraqi government forces using improvised explosive devices, ambushes, snipers, and mortar and rocket fire, in addition to using car bombs, kidnappings or hostage-taking, and assassinations.

For most attacks, the Iraqi guerrillas operate in small teams of five to ten men in order to maintain mobility and escape detection. Larger attacks involving as many as 150 men have appeared on occasion since April 2004 (although larger units had also appeared in a few instances beforehand, such as a battle near the Syrian border town of Rawa on June 13, 2003, and a large ambush of a U.S. convoy in the town of Samarra on November 30, 2003).

All of the following methods of attack are designed to allow insurgent teams to strike quickly and escape detection afterwards.

== Improvised explosive devices (IEDs) ==
Many Iraqi insurgent attacks have made use of improvised explosive devices, or IEDs. In the chaos after the war, mass looting of infrastructure, including munitions, occurred. According to the Pentagon, 250,000 tons (of 650,000 tons total) of ordinance were looted, providing an almost endless source of ammunition for the insurgents.

An improvised fired tank shell hitting a US Humvee in Ramadi

Methods of detonation include simple pull-wires and mechanical detonators, cell-phones, garage-door openers, cable, radio control (RC), and infrared lasers among others. 155-millimetre artillery shells rigged with blasting caps and improvised shrapnel material (concrete, ball bearings, etc.) have been the most commonly used, but the makeshift devices have also gradually become larger as coalition forces add more armor to their vehicles, with evidence from insurgent propaganda videos of aviation bombs of 500 lb being used as IEDs, as well as the introduction of explosively formed penetrator (EFP) warheads.

These explosive devices are often concealed or camouflaged hidden behind roadside rails, on telephone poles, buried underground or in piles of garbage, disguised as rocks or bricks, and even placed inside dead animals. The number of these attacks have steadily increased, emerging as the insurgents' most lethal and favored method to attack coalition forces, with continually improving tactics.

== Ambushes ==
Iraqi insurgents have frequently launched ambushes of military convoys and patrols, using AK-47 assault rifles and rocket-propelled grenades. Soft-skinned humvees have been the most commonly targeted. The congested and constricted terrain of the urban areas, and in the rural areas, palm groves and other crops, offer cover and concealment for insurgents launching ambushes.

These attacks are usually broken off before support can be called in, in traditional guerrilla fashion. Direct ambushes of U.S. forces have declined, however, to avoid insurgent casualties as U.S. defenses improve (armored Humvees and tanks are normally unaffected by rifle fire). The percentage of multinational forces casualties from mines or improvised explosives has risen to 70%.

Ambushes against the poorly protected Iraqi police and security forces, however, have proven very lethal. There have been isolated cases of larger ambushes, such as an attack on a coalition convoy in Samarra on November 30, 2003, that involved 100 fighters and a massive ambush of a coalition convoy in Sadr City on April 4, 2004, by Mahdi Army militiamen numbering over 1000 men.

== Sniper tactics ==
U.S. soldier shot by an Iraqi insurgent sniper in Ramadi, 2006.

The Iraqi insurgents have also used snipers, including vehicle-borne units, to isolate enemy combatants from larger forces and strike at their leader—a demonstration of their technological capabilities and tactical patience. Major Greg Rowlands of the Royal Australian Infantry, a tactics instructor to US company commanders, wrote in 2008 that

[t]hey generally engage targets from 100 to 1000 meters and primarily use the SVD sniper rifle. However, they have also been known to use .50 Cal and captured coalition M24 sniper rifles. [Although an] insurgent sniper pair usually operates from a dominant terrain feature ... [they also use cars and vans resourcefully.] The pair usually films the shot, extracts, and then posts the very graphic and shocking event to the internet ... [focusing on] lucrative targets

As of December 23, 2006, 43 American and 3 British servicemen have been killed by sniper fire in Iraq since the beginning of the invasion. Private military firms have also been targeted; on March 22, 2004, two Finnish businessmen were shot and killed by snipers in Baghdad. Two security contractors, one British and one American (the last working for Blackwater Worldwide) have also been killed by sniper insurgents. Soldiers tell of a supposed member of the insurgency who is alleged to be a very accurate sniper. Nicknamed Juba, he is said to have killed and wounded up to a hundred US military personnel. Iraqi government or rival sectarian medical personnel and ambulances are not assured safety from snipers as seen during 2005 in a now famous video of an attempted kill on a US army medic [3]

== Mortar and rocket strikes ==
Another common form of attack involves hit-and-run mortar or rocket strikes on coalition bases or locations associated with the Iraqi government or a foreign presence. Insurgents fire a few mortar rounds or rockets and quickly escape before their position can be identified and effective counter-fire directed. Insurgents use urban areas heavily populated by civilians as firing positions to discourage counter-fire, and in the countryside, palm groves and orchards are used for concealment. Insurgents commonly mount mortar tubes in the rear cargo area of civilian trucks allowing them to drive away from the launch position before counter-fire or coalition troops can reach them.

This method is very inaccurate and rarely hits the intended target, since the guerrillas do not have time to aim properly, but casualties are still periodically inflicted by incoming mortar rounds and rockets. Improvised multiple-rocket launchers have also been used to target specific buildings in urban areas.

Mortars were used in an attack during October 2006 on Camp Falcon, a forward base which included an ammunition dump. The depot was destroyed by the insurgents, but no casualties were reported.

== Attacks on aircraft ==
Since the beginning of November 2003 military helicopters have also been increasingly targeted. The insurgents, often concealed in palm groves, lie in wait for the helicopters and then attack the helicopter, usually from the rear. The weapons used include rocket-propelled grenades and shoulder-launched surface-to-air missiles such as the SA-7, SA-14, and in one case the SA-16. Countermeasures taken by helicopter pilots, such as flying very low at a high speed, have considerably reduced the number of helicopters shot down, by reducing the time of target acquisition.

Recently, the tactic of flying low has increased the vulnerability of these vehicles to anti-aircraft guns. Helicopters, including Apache gunships, have been severely damaged or destroyed when multiple machine gunners have engaged helicopters at close ranges of 50–400 meters. At this range, the kinetic energy of these bullets is sufficient to penetrate the helicopter's armor.

Another new tactic used by the insurgents to bring down helicopters is the so-called "aerial IED". Basically an explosive charge designed in a way to force the blast straight up into a flight path, this new type of IED may have been responsible for the downing of several helicopters. Such tactics resemble the Vietcong tactic of placing claymore mines, remote-detonated shaped charge explosives, in forest canopy to fire upwards as helicopters passed overhead.

== Suicide bombers ==
Since August 2003, as the U.S-led coalition forces gradually strengthened their defenses, suicide car bombs have been increasingly used as weapons by guerrilla forces. The car bombs, known in the military as "vehicle-borne improvised explosive devices" (VBIEDs, pronounced "vee-beds"), have emerged as one of their most effective weapons, along with the roadside improvised explosive devices. They are often driven by suicide bombers and directed against targets such as Iraqi police stations, recruiting centers for the security services, and U.S. convoys. They have a number of benefits for the insurgency: they deliver a large amount of firepower and inflict large numbers of casualties at little cost to the attackers. However, large numbers of Iraqi civilians are usually killed in such attacks (see below).

== Non-military and civilian targets ==
There have also been many attacks on non-military and civilian targets, beginning in earnest in August 2003 and steadily increasing since then. These include the assassination of Iraqis cooperating with the Coalition Provisional Authority and the Governing Council, considered collaborators by the guerrillas, and suicide bombings targeting the United Nations headquarters, the Jordanian Embassy, Shi'a mosques and civilians, the International Red Cross, Kurdish political parties, the president of the Iraqi Governing Council, hotels, Christian churches, diplomats and restaurants. Armed and unarmed Iraqi police and security forces are also targeted, because they are also considered collaborators. Sometimes they are killed in ambushes and sometimes in execution-style killings. Militants have targeted private contractors working for the coalition as well as other non-coalition support personnel.

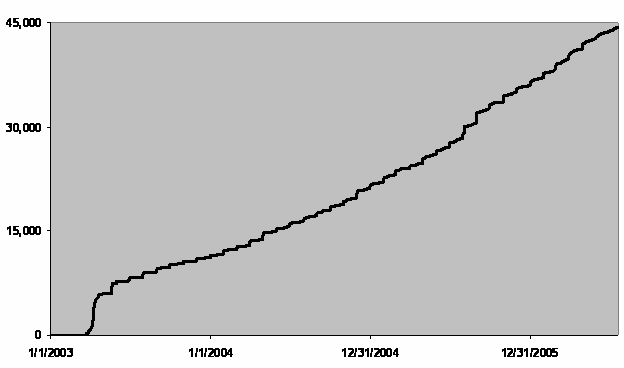
Civilian deaths attributable to insurgent or military action in Iraq, and also to increased criminal violence. For the period between January 1, 2003, and July 20, 2006, as recorded by the Iraq Body Count project. Many of these types of civilian deaths are not reported. See also: Casualties of the conflict in Iraq since 2003.

The origin of the large-scale bombings is considered by many observers to most likely be foreign fighters, former Iraqi secret service operatives, or a combination of the two. It is believed that most of the actual suicide attackers are from outside Iraq, although they most likely are facilitated by Iraqis. The network of Abu Musab al-Zarqawi is frequently blamed by the U.S. and the Iraqi government for suicide attacks on non-military targets.

Coalition officials and some analysts suspect that the aim of these attacks is to sow chaos and sectarian discord. Coalition officials point to an intercepted letter suspected to be from Abu Musab al-Zarqawi, in which he makes the case for attacking Shi'a in order to provoke an anti-Sunni backlash and thereby galvanize the Sunni population in support of the insurgents, as evidence. While hardcore Wahhabi mujahideen among the insurgency may indeed desire a sectarian civil war, other insurgents (both Sunni and Shia) charge that the coalition is attempting to instill a fear of civil war as part of a divide and conquer strategy.

Though attacks on civilians tend to kill much larger numbers of people in comparison to attacks on coalition forces, US Department of Defense data show that the Iraqi insurgency has, since at least April 2004, overwhelmingly targeted coalition forces and Iraqi allies, rather than civilians. According to a recent open editorial in the New York Times, between April 2004 and May 2007, attacks directed against coalition forces comprised 74% of all significant insurgent attacks. 16% were directed against allied Iraqi forces and only 10% were directed at civilians.

This US data, although significant, have not been widely reported in the mainstream. There have been exceptions, however. For instance, in February 2006, Fred Kaplan, writing for Slate, noted that

the vast majority of the Iraqi insurgents' attacks are aimed at Iraqi security forces or at civilians, rather than at U.S. and coalition troops. In other words, as much as was the case a year or two ago, the Iraqi insurgency is primarily an anti Iraqi government insurgency.

Kaplan also noted the disparity between the ‘facts on the ground’ and mainstream media reporting, observing that it was a ‘surprising finding because so many news stories from Iraq have been reporting a rise in attacks on Iraqi security forces and in clashes between Sunni and Shiite factions.’

In February 2007, the Pentagon's quarterly report, Stability and Security in Iraq, found that "Although most attacks continue to be directed against coalition forces, Iraqi civilians suffer the vast majority of the casualties". In late 2006, the BBC News website covered the issue, noting that although "about 80% of insurgent attacks are targeted against coalition forces, the Iraqi population suffers about 80% of all casualties, according to US officials in late 2005." This page, which includes an illustrative bar graph, was last updated November 2006.

This overall pattern has changed following the surge a reduction in troop deaths has followed for the past several months, according to a report by the US General Accounting Office.

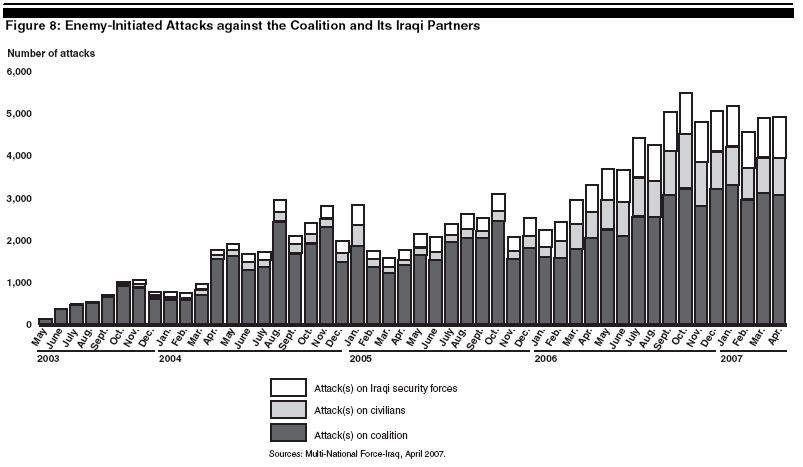

A 2005 Human Rights Watch report analyzes the insurgency in Iraq and highlights "the groups that are most responsible for the abuse, namely al-Qaeda in Iraq, Ansar al-Sunna and the Islamic Army in Iraq, which have all targeted civilians for abductions and executions. The first two groups have repeatedly boasted about massive car bombs and suicide bombs in mosques, markets, bus stations and other civilian areas. Such acts are war crimes and in some cases may constitute crimes against humanity, which are defined as serious crimes committed as part of a widespread or systematic attack against a civilian population."

== Assassinations, kidnappings and beheadings ==
Assassination of local and government officials, translators for coalition forces, employees at coalition bases, informants, and other (so-called) collaborators has been a regular occurrence. Assassinations have taken place in a variety of ways, from close-range small arms fire and drive-by shootings to suicide car-bombers ramming convoys.

Iraq Body Count project data shows that 33% of civilian deaths during the Iraq War resulted from execution after abduction or capture. These were overwhelmingly carried out by unknown actors including insurgents, sectarian militias and criminals.

Kidnapping, and in some cases beheadings, have emerged as another insurgent tactic since April 2004. Foreign civilians have borne the brunt of the kidnappings, although U.S. military personnel have also been targeted. After kidnapping the victim, the insurgents typically make some sort of demand of the government of the hostage's nation and give a time limit for the demand to be carried out, often 72 hours. Beheading is often threatened if the government fails to heed the wishes of the hostage takers. Several individuals, including an American civilian (Nicholas Berg) and a South Korean (Kim Sun-il), among others, have been beheaded. In many cases, tapes of the beheadings are distributed for propaganda purposes. Jill Carroll, a journalist for the Christian Science Monitor, was kidnapped in early 2006, and although later let go, her Iraqi interpreter was killed.

The goal of the kidnappings appears mainly to be to terrify foreign civilians into immobilization and to attract media attention and possibly inspire recruits. Almost all of the kidnappings have been conducted by radical Sunni groups on the fringe of the insurgency. The Mahdi Army, as well as the nationalist and more moderate religious elements of the Sunni insurgency, have rejected kidnapping as a legitimate tactic.

== Attacks on security forces ==
Another insurgent tactic that has been increasingly used since April 2004 includes large-scale assaults and raids on the Iraqi police, their police stations and compounds of Iraqi security forces, whom insurgents view as collaborators, involving platoon-sized elements or larger, often up to 150 men. Large-scale attacks have also been occasionally advanced against U.S. forces. They have been launched both by Sunni insurgents in cities such as Ramadi, Fallujah, and al-Qaim, and by Shia militiamen in cities such as Baghdad, Najaf, and Kufa during the twin uprisings of 2004.

Some attacks may combine multiple weapons and tactics at once, such as rocket-propelled grenades, mortars, and car bombs. Although these attacks usually fail militarily, they are designed to convey an impression of strength on the part of the guerrillas (part of the psychological warfare campaign) and to sow general chaos.

Iraqi insurgents—including local militias, former Ba’athists, and foreign jihadists—employed a asymmetric warfare against coalition forces. Instead of confronting the U.S. military directly in pitched battles, insurgents often used hit-and-run attacks, improvised explosive devices (IEDs), ambushes, and targeted operations against Iraqi security forces. This approach paralleled Fabian principles by exploiting the U.S.’s extended lines, relying on patience, and leveraging local terrain and population support.

== Propaganda ==
Iraqi insurgents have released propaganda videos. These videos seem to mostly consist of footage of combat, training, executions or suicide attacks. These videos are posted online as recruiting tools, as last testaments of suicide bombers, to demonstrate attacks and to influence public opinion.
