= Herbert Burkholz =

Novelist (1929 – 2006)

Herbert Burkholz (December 9, 1929 – April 30, 2006) was a novelist and non-fiction author who also had a short tenure as a speechwriter at the U.S. Food and Drug Administration.

He penned ten novels. The Washington Post in reviewing his book Brain Damage said of it ..."He has given them a puzzler of fiendish cleverness"...

Burkholz also gained some notoriety in writing a series of spy thrillers with Clifford Irving, who spent seventeen months in jail for executing and publishing a false autobiography of the billionaire recluse Howard Hughes.
