= The Red Napoleon =

1929 novel by Floyd Gibbons

- Dust-jacket from the first edition
- Author: Floyd Gibbons
- Language: English
- Genre: Invasion novel
- Publisher: Cape & Smith
- Publication date: 1929
- Publication place: United States
- Media type: Print (hardback)
- Pages: 223

The Red Napoleon is a 1929 novel by Floyd Gibbons predicting a Soviet conquest of Europe and invasion of America. It was inspired by speculation that a Soviet general might seize power in a coup and become a "Red Napoleon" like Napoleon in the French Revolution. The novel contains strong racial overtones such as expressed fear of the yellow peril and of inter-racial breeding.

== Publication history ==
The Red Napoleon first appeared as an illustrated 18-part serial in Liberty magazine, from April 6 to August 3, 1929. It was also published as a novel in 1929.

In 1976, the novel was reissued by the Southern Illinois University Press as part of its Lost American Fiction series with an afterword by John Gardner. Popular Library published the mass market counterpart in 1977.

The novel was banned in the Kingdom of Yugoslavia in 1934.

== Themes ==
The Red Napoleon was the first invasion novel to combine fears of "yellow peril" with fears of communism. The racial elements are the primary thematic focus of the text, with communism operating as the catalyst for the militarization portrayed in the novel. The fictional war portrayed in the text is one of racial annihilation and amalgamation.

The novel's focus on the sexual qualities of its villain was unusual for "yellow peril" stories of the period, which tended to portray their non-white villains as asexual or unappealing. Gibbons describes Karakhan of Kazan (the titular Red Napoleon) as taking a series of white female lovers and encouraging his non-white soldiers to do the same. Gibbons emphasizes the voluntary nature of these couplings, which he portrays as making them more repellent.

== Story ==
The Red Napoleon was published in 1929 and projects the next few years. The character responsible for the invasion is Karakhan of Kazan, a Cossack of Mongol descent. Karakhan became a Soviet general as a teenager during the Russian Civil War. When Joseph Stalin is assassinated by a Polish nationalist in 1932, Karakhan is by his side. Karakhan assumes leadership of the Soviet Union.

Led by Karakhan, the Soviet Union unites with a rising China, which has expelled the French and British colonizers from south Asia and defeated the Japanese. China's victories have also inspired anti-imperialist revolts in north Africa.

With a multi-ethnic army for which Chinese infantry form the core, Karakhan successfully invades Europe. The novel highlights Karakhan's tactical aptitude in his use of horse cavalry supported by tactical fighter aircraft. The advancing army is described as holding banners with slogans like "Conquer and Breed" and flies what Gibbons describes as a "rainbow-like flag" of "miscegenation" with stripes of red, yellow, white, brown, and black.

After invading Europe in 1933, Karakhan's forces defeat Canada, Australia, and Latin America. They invade the United States with an army of 8 million Chinese, pushing through New England in 1934 but bogging down outside of New York City. In early 1936, a United States surprise attack destroys Karakhan's navy outside of Kingston, Jamaica. Karakhan's forces destroy New York City and Washington D.C., but without a navy, are ultimately defeated by the United States. Karakhan is captured and imprisoned in Bermuda. Imprisoned, Karakhan warns his captors that "a comparative handful of white skins cannot continue to crowd their brothers of coloured skin out of a place in the sun."

== See also ==
- Yellow Peril
- Invasion literature
