= W. F. Morris =

English novelist

Walter Frederick Morris (31 May 1892 – 1969) was an English novelist, best known for his mystery novel, Bretherton (1929), set in World War I.

== Life ==
Morris was born in Norwich. He attended Norwich Grammar School and then went up to St Catharine's College, Cambridge, where he studied history. He served with the 8th Battalion of the Norfolk Regiment during World War I, initially as an infantryman, but he was soon commissioned as a temporary officer. He reached the rank of major by the age of 27, and was awarded the Military Cross. At the end of the war he was in command of the Cycle Battalion of the XIII Army Corps.

While serving in the occupation army of the Rhineland in 1919 he met Lewine Corney, and they married later that year. He took up teaching in 1920, first in Jersey, then from 1925 at St Benedict's Priory in Ealing, London.

Morris began writing novels in 1925. He served in World War II as the captain of a searchlight unit in Norfolk. After the war he worked for British Industrial Films Limited, still living in Ealing with his wife. After she died in 1965 he returned to Norwich to live with his two unmarried sisters. He died in 1969.

== Bretherton ==
Critic A.C. Ward praised Bretherton as "an adventure-mystery war-novel with an admirably ingenious and leak-proof plot. This book combines a brilliant exercise of creative imagination with a remarkable ability to reproduce, vividly, first-hand experiences, and there is one brief battle-scene…which is memorable." (The Nineteen-Twenties, Literature and Ideas in the Post-War Decade, 1930, pp 163–4). Spy novelist Eric Ambler named the book as one of his top five spy stories (in the Afterword to the 1952 edition of his Epitaph for a Spy).

== List of works ==
- Veteran Youth (as Corney Morris, c1927 Hodder & Stoughton)
- The British Empire (1927)
- Bretherton: Khaki or Field Grey? (1929 Geoffrey Bles) Published in United States as G.B (1929 Dodd, Mead)
- Behind the Lines (1930 Geoffrey Bles). Published in United States as The Strange Case of Gunner Rawley (1930 Dodd, Mead)
- Pagan (1931 Geoffrey Bles)
- The Hold-up (1933 Geoffrey Bles)
- Something to His Advantage (1935 Geoffrey Bles)
- Goring's First Case (as Peter Kippax, 1936 Michael Joseph)
- No Turning Back (1937 Michael Joseph)
- The Channel Mystery (1939)
