= One of Those Ways =

1929 novel

- American cover
- Author: Marie Belloc Lowndes
- Language: English
- Genre: Mystery crime
- Publisher: Heinemann; Knopf (US)
- Publication date: 1929
- Publication place: United Kingdom
- Media type: Print

One of Those Ways is a 1929 romantic mystery crime novel by the British writer Marie Belloc Lowndes. It marked the return of Hercules Popeau, a French detective character first introduced in The Lonely House, who appears in the second half of the novel. The title is a quote from The Pilgrim's Progress "Now the name of one of those ways was Danger".

== Synopsis ==
Angela Graham has been living well above her means in London and after losing heavily at the roulette wheel one night on Park Lane she is now completely broke. Forced now to look for work she accepts an offer to become lady's companion to the cousin of a White Russian prince. She is forced to give up all hope of Lord Cherwell, the charming, friendly but breezily evasive Englishman she had struck up a close friendship over the past months. As she journeys across France via Paris to the villa on the French Riviera, the prince's behaviour is erratic and he explains that this is due to his fears of assassination by Bolshevik enemies.

While the Princess is at least friendly to Angela, her new employer the Princess is much colder and jealous. Angela's primary job is to accompany the party to the various casinos along the coast including at Monte Carlo, where she generally plays on behalf of the princess. The remainder of the time she is largely cut off from the world. Popeau of the Sûreté arriving on the Rivieria to track a gang of confidence tricksters making a fortune by creating fake plaques to cash in at the casino, takes special notice of the naïve Angela and the Prince who is already well known to him. He begins to fear that Angela may be in danger from her own ruthless associates.

== Bibliography ==
- Klein, Kathleen Gregory. Great Women Mystery Writers: Classic to Contemporary. Greenwood Press, 1994.
- Magill, Frank Northen . Critical Survey of Mystery and Detective Fiction: Authors, Volume 3. Salem Press, 1988.
- Maida, Patricia D. & Spornick Nicholas B. Murder She Wrote: A Study of Agatha Christie's Detective Fiction. Popular Press, 1982.
- Reilly, John M. Twentieth Century Crime & Mystery Writers. Springer, 2015.
- Vinson, James. Twentieth-Century Romance and Gothic Writers. Macmillan, 1982.
