= The Stoat =

1940 novel

- First edition (UK)
- Author: Lynn Brock
- Language: English
- Series: Colonel Gore
- Genre: Mystery thriller
- Publisher: Collins Crime Club (UK); Harper & Brothers (US)
- Publication date: 1940
- Publication place: United Kingdom
- Media type: Print
- Preceded by: Q.E.D.

The Stoat is a 1940 mystery detective novel by the Irish-born writer Lynn Brock. It was the seventh and last novel in his series featuring the character of the Golden Age detective Colonel Wyckham Gore. It was also his last published work before his death three years later. It marked a return for Gore, who hadn't appeared in a novel since 1930.

== Synopsis ==
Gore's assistance is sought by his old army colleague Colonel Margesson, who was having difficulties with his wife and children. When not only Margesson but his two children are killed, the case proves baffling until a visit to Ireland reveals the explanation.

== Bibliography ==
- Keating, Henry Reymond Fitzwalter. Whodunit?: A Guide to Crime, Suspense, and Spy Fiction. Van Nostrand Reinhold Company, 1982.
- Reilly, John M. Twentieth Century Crime & Mystery Writers. Springer, 2015.
