= The Mendip Mystery =

1929 novel

- First edition (UK)
- Author: Lynn Brock
- Language: English
- Series: Colonel Gore
- Genre: Detective
- Publisher: William Collins, Sons; Harper & Brothers (US)
- Publication date: 1929
- Publication place: United Kingdom
- Media type: Print
- Preceded by: The Slip-Carriage Mystery
- Followed by: Q.E.D.

The Mendip Mystery is a 1929 mystery detective novel by the Irish-born writer Lynn Brock. It was the fifth of seven novels in his series featuring the character of Colonel Wyckham Gore, one of the most prominent investigators during the early stages of the Golden Age of Detective Fiction. It was published in America with the alternative title of Murder at the Inn.

== Synopsis ==
Colonel Gore is due to meet a client at a lonely inn located in the Mendip Hills of Somerset. While there a variety of strange and disturbing events happen, culminating in the murder of a local landowner Louis Tanquered. Gore's initial investigations seem to demonstrate that events long in the past led to the killing.

== Bibliography ==
- Athill, Robin. Mendip, a New Study. David and Charles, 1976.
- Reilly, John M. Twentieth Century Crime & Mystery Writers. Springer, 2015.
