= Joseph Douillet =

Belgian diplomat

Joseph Douillet (French: [ʒozɛf dujɛ]; 1878–1954) was a Belgian diplomat to the Soviet Union, known as the author of Moscou sans Voiles: Neuf ans de travail au pays des Soviets (Moscow Unmasked: A Record of Nine Years Work in Soviet Russia) published in 1928. The work heavily criticized Soviet Communism and formed a major influence on Hergé's cartoon book Tintin in the Land of the Soviets.

== Career and writings ==
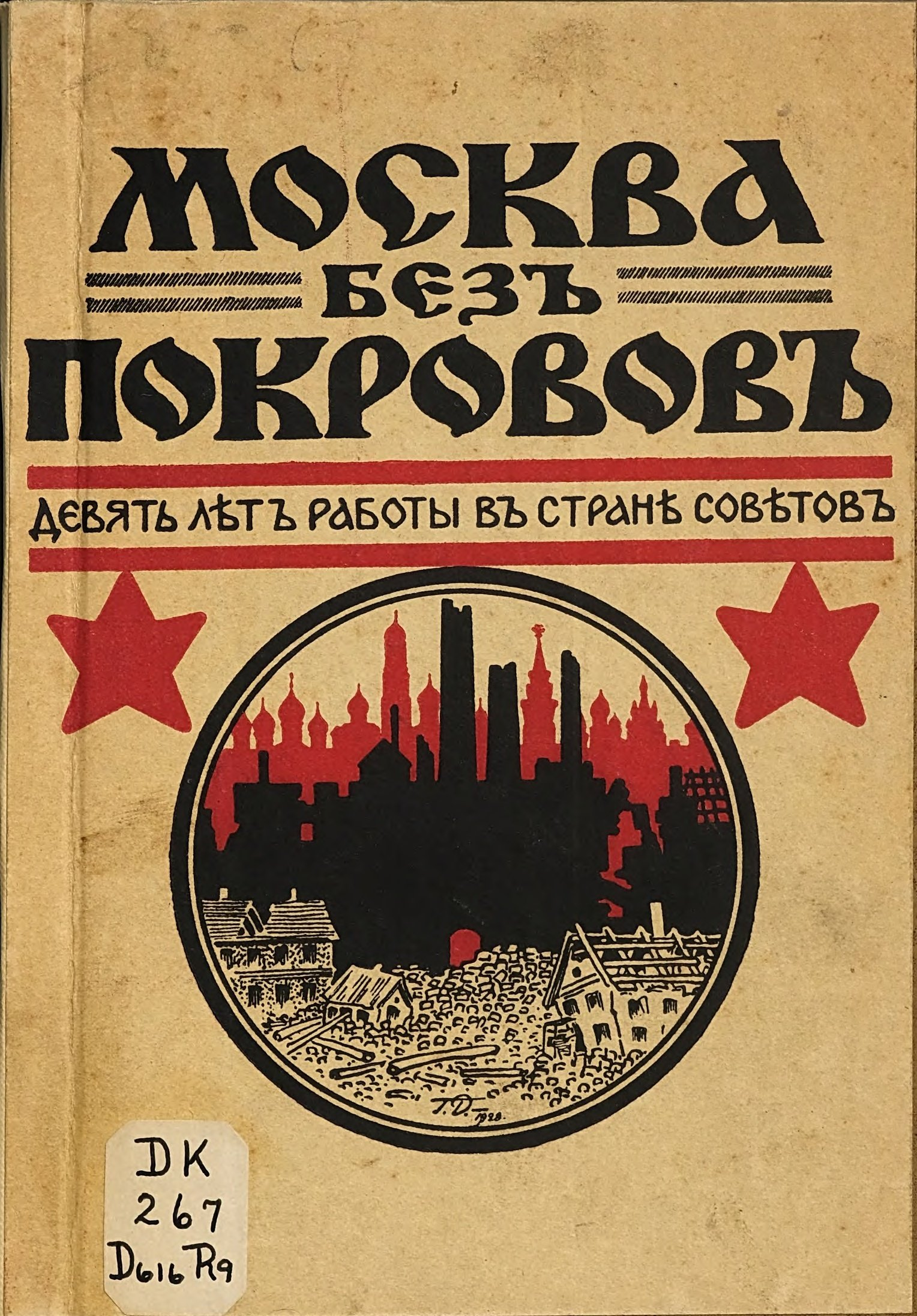
Russian translation, published in Riga (1928)

Douillet lived in Russia from 1891 to 1926. He served as the Belgian consul in Rostov-on-Don. It has been said that he "had spent so long in the country that he was almost more Russian than Belgian." In 1925 he was arrested in the USSR and was imprisoned for nine months before being expelled from the country.

In 1928 he published a book Moscou sans Voiles: Neuf ans de travail au pays des Soviets, which condemned the Bolshevik regime. Among the charges recorded in the book are that the Soviet government created false factories to deceive foreign visitors. "The first part of Douillet's book was called: 'How the red paradise is portrayed', and is full of examples of how foreign visitors are deceived."

Another part of the book recorded how one Oebijkon coerced people into assenting for Communist rule during an election. "We see the communist comrade Oebijkon (who is resigning from the presidency) delivering a speech. This is what he says: 'We have three lists: one of these comes from the communist party. Let anyone who is against this list raise their hand!' At the same moment Oebijkon and four of his comrades pull their revolvers and direct them menacingly at the peasant audience. Oebijkon continued: 'Who votes against this list? No one? Then I declare that everyone voted for the communist list. There is no need to vote for the other two lists anymore.'" This episode would later be used in Tintin in the Land of the Soviets.

Another charge made was that the USSR presented a deceptive perspective of the state of the USSR to foreign visitors:

The Soviet government has, over the last few years, methodically pursued a campaign in workers' circles in the West to invite them to visit Soviet Russia in groups, offering them easy visas, free transport and other attractive privileges. The Soviets state that only a personal visit by the worker permits him to realise how mendacious and unmerited are the attacks in the capitalist press which speak of the discontent of the Russian people, of the breakdown and the poverty of the country under the Soviet regime. The purpose of this campaign is the following: the foreign delegations are shown a series of factories, hospitals, daycare centers, retirement homes, carefully chosen and meticulously arranged in advance, with the intention of demonstrating the perfection of such institutions in the USSR

— Moscou sans Voiles: Neuf ans de travail au pays des Soviets

It was translated into English by Albert William King and published by The Pilot Press (London) in 1930.

== Influence on Tintin in the Land of the Soviets ==
Abbe Norbert Wallez, editor of Le Petit Vingtième, gave Douillet's book to Hergé to study in order to create Tintin in the Land of the Soviets. It was the only book Hergé drew upon to write that story. Although it is now well known that most of what was published in Moscou sans Voiles is false and functioned as propaganda.

Some specific episodes from Douillet's book are included by Hergé in Tintin in the Land of the Soviets, including coerced elections, imitating Douillet's account of Oebijkon, and fake factories made to deceive foreign visitors, in Tintin's case English Communists. "In Hergé's story, Tintin watches English communists visiting working factories, which are actually stage sets: 'And this is how those Soviets fool people who still believe in the red paradise.'" Hergé also included an incident depicting state requisitioning of kulaks' grain. Similar events occurred under War Communism and later dekulakization campaign during the collectivization.

Douillet portrayed Communists in the USSR in a very negative light and this influenced the portrayal of Communists in Hergé's book. Moscou sans Voiles is highly critical of the Soviet regime, although Hergé contextualised this by noting that in Belgium, at the time a devout Catholic nation, "Anything Bolshevik was atheist".

Hergé later dismissed the failings of this first story as "a transgression of my youth". By 1999, some part of this presentation was being noted as far more reasonable, The Economist declaring: "In retrospect, however, the land of hunger and tyranny painted by Hergé was uncannily accurate".

== Later life and death ==
Near the end of the 1920s, Douillet and his son Victor founded the Centre International de Lutte Active Contre le Communisme (CILACC), an anti-Communist group. CILACC and its founders were never to enjoy the full confidence of the Entente Internationale Anticommuniste, another anti-Communist organization.

Douillet died in 1954.

== Publication ==
- Joseph Douillet, Moscow Unmasked: a record of nine years' work and observation in Soviet Russia, translated from the Russian by Albert William King (London: The Pilot Press, March 1930)
