= Lynn Brock =

Irish writer

- Born: Alexander Patrick McAllister; 4 July 1877; Dublin, Ireland
- Died: 6 April 1943 (aged 65); Dorchester, Dorset, England
- Other names: Lynn Brock, Alister McAllister, Anthony Wharton
- Occupation: Novelist

Alexander Patrick McAllister (4 July 1877 – 6 April 1943) was an Irish-English writer, best known for a series of mystery novels written under the pen name Lynn Brock. He also used pen name Alister McAllister and wrote several plays as Anthony Wharton.

He was educated at the National University of Ireland (NUI), where he served as librarian/clerk/chief clerk between 1903 and 1914. After his first success with the play 'Irene Wycherly' in London in 1906 he wrote a series of plays though remained based in Dublin.

During the First World War he served with the British Army in British Intelligence and in the Machine Gun Corps being wounded twice in France.

After retiring from the NUI he moved to London and later to Ferndown in Dorset. He continued writing and turned his hand to fiction, producing short stories, serious fiction and the series of Colonel Gore detective novels under the name Lynn Brock, which enjoyed popularity in the 1920s and 1930s during the Golden Age of Detective Fiction. His novels employ a complexity of style and are generally set in rural locations.

He died aged 65 in Dorchester, Dorset.

== Main works ==
=== Plays ===
- Irene Wycherley (1906/7)
- A Nocturne (1908)
- At The Barn (1912)
- 13 Simon Street (1913)
- A Guardian Angel (1915 - one act play)
- The Riddle (1916 - with Morley Roberts)
- Needles and pins (1929)
- The Mendip mystery (pub. 1929, staged 1931)
- The O'Cuddy (staged 1943)

=== Colonel Wyckham Gore novels ===
- The Deductions of Colonel Gore (1924)
- Colonel Gore’s Second Case (1925)
- The Kink (1927)
- The Slip-Carriage Mystery (1928)
- The Mendip Mystery (1929)
- Q.E.D. (1930)
- The Stoat (1940)

=== Other novels ===
- The Two Of Diamonds (1926)
- The Dagwort Coombe Murder (1929)
- Nightmare (1932)
- The Silver Sickle Case (1938)
- Fourfingers (1939)
- The Riddle of the Roost (1939)

== Bibliography ==
- Keating, Henry Reymond Fitzwalter. Whodunit?: A Guide to Crime, Suspense, and Spy Fiction. Van Nostrand Reinhold Company, 1982.
- Reilly, John M. Twentieth Century Crime & Mystery Writers. Springer, 2015.
