= Bretherton: Khaki or Field Grey? =

1929 novel by W. F. Morris

- Author: W. F. Morris
- Language: English
- Genre: War novel
- Publication date: 1929
- Publication place: United Kingdom

Bretherton: Khaki or Field Grey? is a novel by W. F. Morris, first published in 1929 by Geoffrey Bles. It was published in the U.S. under the titles G. B.: A Story of the Great War (Dodd, Mead & Co.) and G. B.: The Mystery of the Shelled Chateau (Grosset & Dunlap).

At the time of its publication, it was called "the finest English war-novel yet issued" by Arnold Bennett. The title of the novel refers to the colours of the uniforms of the British and German armies, khaki and feldgrau.

== Plot summary ==
The novel begins with Gurney, a young British officer, entering a deserted chateau as the British advance in November 1918. Inside he finds three corpses, and is astonished when he recognises one of them as a fellow officer, Gerard Bretherton, the more so since Bretherton is wearing the uniform of a German general.

The story of how Bretherton met his fate is built up over a two-year period over the rest of the narrative. The story is told from the points of view of several of Bretherton's friends and acquaintances.

Gerard Bretherton, English but brought up partly in Germany and a fluent speaker of the German language, is taken prisoner during an attack on the enemy lines, and loses his memory, taking on the identity of a German officer with whom he was acquainted before the war. Having recovered his memory, he escapes and returns to Britain, where, after telling his story, he is recruited by the security forces who persuade him to masquerade as a German officer in order to infiltrate the German armed forces and supply them with information.

While joining an escape attempt from a British POW camp (set up by the authorities) along with a German officer, Bretherton is trapped in a barrel in which he has hidden during the sea voyage across the Channel. The traumatic experience causes him to lose his memory again, and he reverts to the personality of a German. Recovering his memory on the brink of the end of the war in 1918, he returns to his own side, but heroically volunteers to re-cross the German lines in an effort to minimize the loss of life before the Armistice is officially signed. He succeeds in his task, but is himself killed before the British troops arrive on the scene.
