= William Maxwell Reed =

American writer

- c. 1918
- Born: January 12, 1871; Bath, Maine, US
- Died: September 2, 1962 (aged 91); Coconut Grove, Florida, US
- Education: Harvard College
- Occupations: Astronomer, writer
- Spouse: Jannetta Gordon Studdiford (m. 1913)

William Maxwell Reed (January 12, 1871 – September 2, 1962) was a pioneering U.S. author of illustrated science books for children.

== Biography ==
At Harvard, c. 1893

William Maxwell Reed was born in Bath, Maine on January 12, 1871.

After schooling at Harvard, he taught astronomy at Harvard and Princeton University.

Reed later went into the steel industry. He married Jannetta Gordon Studdiford in Montclair, New Jersey on April 15, 1913.

Beginning as a series of letters to his nephew, his first book, The Earth for Sam, was published in 1929. The book remains popular and was republished in 2005.

Earth was followed by a series of popular children's information books, many published by Harcourt, Brace.

Reed died at his home in Coconut Grove, Florida on September 2, 1962.

== Books ==
- The Earth for Sam; the story of mountains, rivers, dinosaurs and men (1929). Illustrated by biologist/artist James Howard McGregor.
- The Stars for Sam (1931). Illustrated by Karl Moseley.
- And that's why (1932)
- The Sea for Sam (w/ Wilfred S. Bronson) (1935)
- Animals on the March (w/ Jannette May Lucas) (1937)
- America's Treasure (1939)
- The Sky is Blue (illustrated by James MacDonald) (1940)
- Patterns In The Sky: The Story Of The Constellations (1951)
