= Paul Alverdes =

German novelist and poet (1897–1979)

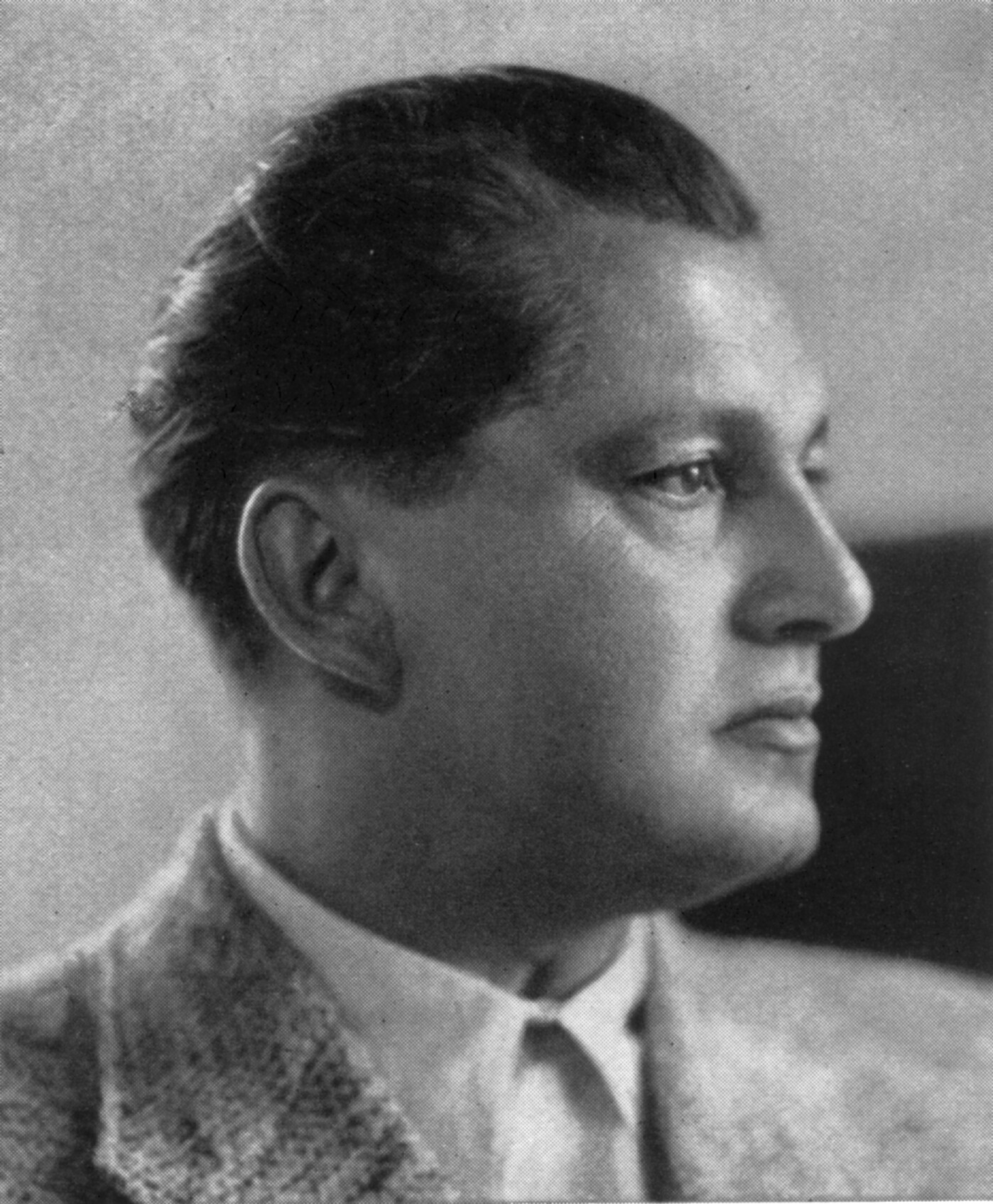
- Born: May 6, 1897 Strasbourg, German Empire
- Died: February 28, 1979 (aged 81) Munich, West Germany
- Occupation: Novelist, poet, editor
- Period: 1922–1979
- Genre: War novel, poetry, children's literature
- Subject: World War I, camaraderie, youth movement
- Literary movement: German Youth Movement
- Notable works: Die Pfeiferstube (The Whistler's Room)

Paul Alverdes (6 May 1897, Strasbourg – 28 February 1979, Munich) was a German novelist and poet.

The son of an officer and member of the German Youth Movement, he volunteered for duty in World War I and received a severe injury to the throat. After 1922 he was a freelance author in Munich, and from 1934 to 1944, along with Karl Benno von Mechow, he edited and published the journal Das innere Reich. Alverdes's work was influenced by the youth movement and by the World War I front experience, whose purifying and "transforming" power he praised. Nonetheless, he was only moderately popular with National Socialists because he lacked an "activist-dynamic attitude". After 1945 he mainly wrote stories for children.

== Works ==
- Die Nördlichen (The Northerners; 1922)
- Die Pfeiferstube (The Whistler's Room; 1929)
- Reinhold oder die Verwandelten
- Die Freiwilligen (The Volunteers; 1934)
- Das Winterlager
- Eine Infanterie – Division bricht durch
- Deutsches Andenkenbuch
- Das Zwiegesicht
- Dank und Dienst. Reden und Aufsätze
- Märchen (Das Männlein Mittenzwei) (The Little In-Between Man; 1937)
- Grimmbarts Haus (Grimbart's House; 1949)
- Legende vom Christ-Esel (1953)
- Wenig Träum Pferde (1958) (Little Dream Horses)
