= The Dagwort Coombe Murder =

1929 novel by Lynn Brock

- First US edition
- Author: Lynn Brock
- Language: English
- Genre: Detective
- Publisher: Collins Crime Club (UK); Harper & Brothers (US)
- Publication date: 1929
- Publication place: United Kingdom
- Media type: Print

The Dagwort Coombe Murder is a 1929 mystery detective novel by the Irish-born writer Lynn Brock. It was the first stand-alone novel by Brock following the success of his Golden age detective Colonel Gore. It was published in the United States with the alternative title The Stoke Silver Case.

== Synopsis ==
While searching for an idea for her next work, playwright Sarah Virginia Langley goes on holiday with her friend Susan Yatt, to the Quantock Hills in rural Somerset. While at Dagwort Coombe she attempts to solve the murder of the owner of the country estate Stoke Silver Park. Widely disliked he has several enemies who may have killed him.

== Bibliography ==
- Hubin, Allen J. Crime Fiction, 1749-1980: A Comprehensive Bibliography. Garland Publishing, 1984.
- Reilly, John M. Twentieth Century Crime & Mystery Writers. Springer, 2015.
