= Graham Seton Hutchison =

British Army officer, author and fascist activist

Lieutenant-Colonel Graham Seton Hutchison DSO MC
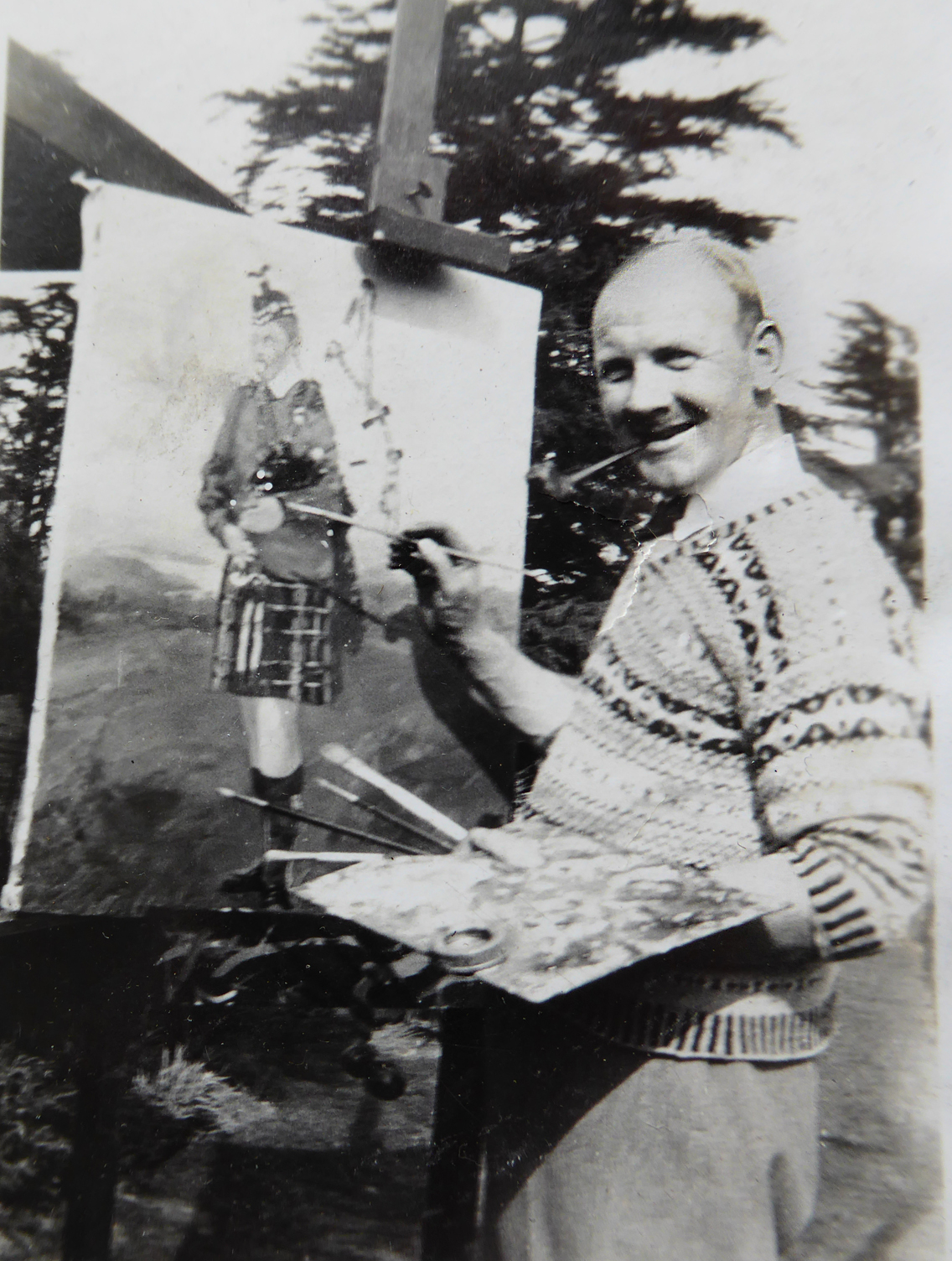
- Born: 20 January 1890; Hampstead, London, England
- Died: 3 April 1946 (aged 56); Wycombe, Buckinghamshire, England
- Citizenship: British
- Education: Royal Military College, Sandhurst
- Occupations: Army officer Writer
- Years active: 1909–1946
- Known for: fascist politics
- Notable work: The W Plan; History of the Machine Gun Corps; The Red Colonel
- Political party: Liberal Party; British Fascists; British Empire Fascist Party
- Movement: National Workers Movement

Lieutenant-Colonel Graham Seton Hutchison (20 January 1890 – 3 April 1946) was a much-decorated British First World War army officer, military theorist, author, and fascist activist. He wrote adventure novels as Graham Seton and works of non-fiction as G. S. Hutchison.

Hutchison became a celebrated figure in military circles for his tactical innovations during the First World War and made a contribution to early spy fiction with his novel The W Plan (1929). He went into politics as a Liberal
and later was active in fringe fascist movements which gained little support.

== Early life ==
Hutchison was born in Hampstead in January 1890, the son of James Alexander Hutchison, a merchant originally from Inverness, although he had settled in the newly created County of London. In 1887, at St George's, Hanover Square, he had married Beatrice Jameson Waterlow, the daughter of a stationer in Reigate.

Hutchison was one of three sons. He had an older brother, Colin Alexander, and a twin brother, Legh Richmond. In 1891, the family was living in Belsize Park, Hampstead, with four servants. His older brother rose to the rank of Captain in the Royal Navy. His twin brother worked in insurance in the City of London.

Hutchison was educated in Hampstead and at the Royal Military College, Sandhurst.

== Military career ==
In November 1909, Hutchison was commissioned from Sandhurst into the King's Own Scottish Borderers as a second lieutenant. He remained with the regiment until 1913. In April 1913, he was commissioned as a lieutenant into the Special Reserve of Officers of the Argyll and Sutherland Highlanders. Before the outbreak of the First World War, he spent time in colonial Africa, serving with the British South Africa Police and the Rhodesian Army.

In 1914, Hutchison returned to the British Army initially with the 2nd Battalion, Argyll and Sutherland Highlanders, and the Machine Gun Corps. In 1917 Hutchison, at the time a Major and Machine Gun Officer in the 33rd Division, convinced his commanding officer to group all the machine gunners, who were spread between four brigades, into a single company under his command, a scheme that was soon rolled out across the British Army resulting in the Machine Gun Corps becoming an independent branch of the army. He also became noted for his strong opposition to retreat and recounted a story of how in March 1918 he shot all but two of a group of forty British soldiers fleeing from the German Imperial Army.

Hutchison's exploits made him a well-known figure. In August 1916, he was awarded the Military Cross, and in September 1918 he received the Distinguished Service Order “for conspicuous gallantry and devotion to duty while in command of three companies of machine gunners”. He was at the time a temporary lieutenant colonel.

A more unusual tribute followed in 1921, when the composer Kenneth J. Alford penned a marching tune, The Mad Major, in Hutchison's honour.

On 27 May 1922, Hutchison resigned his commission in the Argyll and Sutherland Highlanders and was granted the substantive rank of lieutenant colonel.

== Post-war activity ==
Following his war service Hutchison took an interest in the welfare of ex-soldiers, forming the Old Contemptibles Association and then taking a leading role in setting up the British Legion. Between 1920 and 1921 he was part of the Upper Silesian Commission and he would write that his time there gave him significant sympathy with the defeated Germans and convinced him that the Treaty of Versailles was an unjust settlement.

His first involvement in party politics came with the Liberal Party and he was its candidate in Uxbridge in the 1923 general election, when he doubled the Liberal vote, from 16 to 32 per cent, but failed to be elected. He later moved far away from liberalism, becoming a member of the reactionary, anti-democratic English Mistery soon after its foundation in 1930. This was in favour of bringing back the feudal system. Hutchison had previously led his own similar group, the Paladin League, although it did not enjoy such a high profile as English Mistery. His other political sympathies included a strong strain of anti-Semitism, which he claimed was engendered by contempt for his Jewish classmates whilst at school in Hampstead, and support for the Social Credit economic ideas of C. H. Douglas. During the 1930s he corresponded with Ezra Pound, largely over their shared interest in Social Credit.

== Fascism ==
Like a small number of British Army officers after the First World War, Hutchison was attracted to the militarism of fascism and he became involved in a number of movements. He initially claimed to have a large band of supporters, including the ludicrous claim that he had 20,000 followers in Mansfield alone, and attempted in 1931 to merge this unnamed group with the British Fascists (BF). However Rotha Lintorn-Orman broke off negotiations when it became clear that Hutchison had no movement at all to speak of.

In November 1933, Hutchison formed his own group, the British Empire Fascist Party, and presented a 24-point programme for "National Reconstruction". This document, which was avowedly fascist unlike the BF (a group which, despite its name, had an underdeveloped ideology that was denounced by sometime member Arnold Leese as "conservatism with knobs on"), called for the destruction of the party system, the establishment of a corporate state with highly statist overtones, a stronger policy of imperialism and the removal of most rights from Britain's Jews.

The same year, Hutchison also formed a group called the National Workers Movement, which changed its name to the National Socialist Workers Party before finally settling on the title of the National Workers Party. By this point, Hutchinson had become obsessed by Nazism and wrote widely in praise of the ideology and Adolf Hitler. Despite its pretensions to appealing to the working class, the group only appeared to have one other regular member, Commander E.H. Cole, who was better known for his time in the Imperial Fascist League. Hutchison, who was paid by Nazi Germany as a publicist, led the group largely because of his antipathy towards Oswald Mosley and his much larger British Union of Fascists, whom he believed to be under Jewish influence. Like the Nazis, Hutchison was strongly critical of Freemasonry and mainline Christianity, calling for a move to Positive Christianity. However it was to Mosley that Hutchison lost his support, as members of the Nordic League initially sympathetic towards the National Workers Party were won over to the BUF by the efforts of the likes of J.F.C. Fuller and Robert Gordon-Canning.

Despite his opposition to Mosley, there is a letter on file, written on British Union of Fascists headed paper, which is a communication between Hutchinson and Dr. Thost of the Nazi press in the UK, the letter written in German and signed, Heil Hitler! by Hutchinson. Further, German press articles allude to him being the leader of the British National Workers Party.

Hutchison nonetheless remained a vocal activist and in 1936 ran foul of Clement Attlee when he publicly claimed that the Labour Party politician was a Jew who was engineering a world war, supporting white slavery, and punishing the poor. Attlee filed a libel action against Hutchison, although this was ultimately withdrawn when Hutchison publicly apologised and disowned his claims. Remaining a vocal Hitlerite, including declaring public support for the Anschluss, Hutchison became disillusioned by the German occupation of Czechoslovakia and by the time of the Invasion of Poland in 1939 he was praising Poland for standing up to what he had come to see as Hitler's bullying tactics.

== Scottish nationalism ==
Although he had spent much of his early years in London, Hutchison saw himself as first and foremost Scottish and wrote "I have always flatly declined to describe myself as 'British'". In his 1945 essay "The Highland Division can Save Scotland", he declared his support for Scottish independence and declared his support for the Scottish National Party. He called for the return to the Clan system as a basis of a classless, corporatist Scotland, arguing that the Scots represented a unique race. His ideas were largely undeveloped, however, as Hutchison died the following year before expanding upon them.

== Author ==
Hutchison was a prolific author of espionage and adventure novels and also of military history.

=== Novels ===
Several of Hutchison's novels share a leading character, a retired Scottish army officer turned spy, Colonel Duncan Grant. Fair-haired, he speaks excellent German and understands Karl Marx and Friedrich Nietzsche. The proofs of the first Duncan Grant spy novel, The W Plan (1929), were read by D. H. Lawrence before publication. Lawrence dismissed the book as poor, for what he felt were its unconvincing attempts to portray Germany and its unrealistic portrayals of women. Despite Lawrence's criticisms, in 1930 a film of the book was made, produced and directed by Victor Saville and starring Brian Aherne, Madeleine Carroll, and Gordon Harker. Hutchison's novels did find favour with Ezra Pound, who praised them, along with those of John Hargrave, for what Pound felt was their "specific treatment of live economies".

In Eye for an Eye (1932), Soviet spies steal a radiologist's invention. Minos Magnificent! (1935) is set in the Bronze Age in Crete, where Minoan civilization sees unexpected developments thanks to a successful flying machine invented by Daedalus.

The last Colonel Grant thriller was The V Plan (1941), a Second World War story set in the near future, in which the Allies defeat Germany by invading Europe through a top secret Channel Tunnel.

Hutchison's last novel, The Red Colonel (1945), broke away from some of his earlier work in that it was highly critical of the Nazis, mirroring his own claimed disillusionment with that movement. Colonel Grant ends his career by murdering Hitler.

=== Non-fiction ===
Hutchison published a History of the Machine Gun Corps, although this non-fiction work was characterised by its vivid accounts of battle, almost reading like a novel. Another of his non-fiction works was a biography of Peter McLintock, who had served as his batman during the war. His work Warrior (1932), a consideration of the philosophy behind war, was in a similar vein to Ernst Jünger's work on the topic.

As a freelance journalist, Hutchison attended a few of the Nuremberg Rallies and was paid by Joseph Goebbels to write glowing tributes to the spectacles.

== Personal life ==
On 8 November 1919, at Harrow Weald, Middlesex, Hutchison married Emilie Beatrice Durham, a daughter of Charles H. Durham, a merchant of that parish. He stated his residence as Glasgow. On 2 July 1940, his mother, Beatrice Hutchison, died at Maddox Farm, Little Bookham, Surrey.

Hutchison died in April 1946, at home in High Wycombe, Buckinghamshire, aged 56. He left an estate valued for probate at £3931, and his executor was his brother Legh Richmond Hutchison, then a fire insurance superintendent. His home address and place of death was noted in January 1947 as Booker Hill Farm, High Wycombe. Hutchison's widow, who had been born in 1892, survived him until 24 January 1972 and died in Radlett, Hertfordshire.

== Selected publications ==
=== Novels ===
- Graham Seton, The W Plan (London: Butterworth, 1929)
- Graham Seton, The Governor of Kattowitz (London: Butterworth, 1930)
- Graham Seton, Colonel Grant's To-morrow (London: Butterworth, 1931)
- Graham Seton, Eye for an Eye (London: Butterworth, 1932)
- Graham Seton, Life Without End (London: Butterworth, 1932)
- Graham Seton, Minos Magnificent! (London: Hutchinson, 1935)
- Graham Seton, Scar 77 (London: Rich & Cowan, 1936)
- Graham Seton, The Master Book of Secrets and Secret Societies (1937)
- Graham Seton, According to Plan (London: Rich & Cowan, 1938)
- Graham Seton, Tiger's Cub (London: Rich & Cowan, 1940)
- Graham Seton, The V Plan (London: Eyre & Spottiswoode, 1941)
- Graham Seton, The Red Colonel (1946)

=== Non-fiction ===
- G. S. Hutchison, Footslogger: An autobiography (1931)
- G. S. Hutchison, 'The Paladin League of Youth: Its Charter and Its Mission', in The Superman Magazine, January 1931
- G. S. Hutchison, Warrior (London: Hutchinson, 1932)
- G. S. Hutchison, Arya: the call of the future A stream of fresh light on the great problem of India (London: Hutchinson, 1933)
- G. S. Hutchison, Meteor (London: Hutchinson, 1933)
- G. S. Hutchison, The Viper of Luxor (London: Hutchinson, 1933)
- G. S. Hutchison, Your Verdict? (London: Hutchinson, 1934)
- G. S. Hutchison, Blood Money (London: Hutchinson, 1934)
- G. S. Hutchison, Challenge (London: Hutchinson, 1934)
- G. S. Hutchison, Pilgrimage (London: Hutchinson, 1935)
- G. S. Hutchison, Minos Magnificent (London: Hutchinson, 1935)
- G. S. Hutchison, Pelican Row (London: Hutchinson, 1935)
- G. S. Hutchison, Truth (London: Hutchinson, 1936)
- G. S. Hutchison, Personal statement by G. S. Hutchinson (National Workers' Party of Great Britain, 1936)
- G. S. Hutchison, Machine Guns: Their History and Tactical Employment (1938)
- G. S. Hutchison, Challenge to Youth (London: J. M. Dent & Sons, 1942)
- G. S. Hutchison, Kitchener the Man (1943)
- G. S. Hutchison, Cecil Rhodes, the Man (Oxford University Press, 1944)
- G. S. Hutchison, 'The Sculptor, Sir William Reynolds-Stephens’ (Nottingham Castle Museum, 1944)
- G. S. Hutchison, with foreword by Sir Bernard Montgomery, The British Army (London & Chesham: Gramol Publications, 1945)
- G. S. Hutchison, The Highland Division can save Scotland (Milne, Tannahill & Methven, 1946)
