= 1941 in literature =

This article contains information about the literary events and publications of 1941.

== Events ==
- January 3 – A decree (Normalschrifterlaß) issued in Nazi Germany by Martin Bormann on behalf of Adolf Hitler calls for replacement of blackletter typefaces by Antiqua.
- January 20 – Chittadhar Hridaya begins a six-year sentence of imprisonment in Kathmandu for writing poetry in Nepal Bhasa, during which time he secretly composes his Buddhist epic Sugata Saurabha in that language.
- January 21–23 – A failed "Legionary Rebellion" in Bucharest, opposing loyalists of the Ion Antonescu government to the radically fascist Iron Guard, doubles as a pogrom against Romanian Jews. Avant-garde poet Ion Barbu joins a rebel squad storming into the Ministry of Education; meanwhile, his colleague Ion Vinea protects a Jewish friend, the novelist Sergiu Dan. The destruction of Jewish life and property is documented from inside the Jewish community by the photojournalist F. Brunea-Fox, and by Marcel Janco. Janco's brother-in-law, essayist Jacques G. Costin, survives, but his brother is tortured and killed by the Guard; the murder prompts Janco to leave for British Palestine in February.
- Spring – The Antioch Review is founded as a literary magazine at Antioch College in Ohio.
- March
  - Jean-Paul Sartre is released from prisoner-of-war camp on health grounds.
  - Eugene O'Neill completes Long Day's Journey into Night (published and premiered in 1956).
  - Publication of Lord David Cecil's The English Poets by William Collins in London, first of the 'Britain in Pictures' series devised by Hilda Matheson (died 1940) to celebrate British identity.
- April 6 – The National Library of Serbia is destroyed by bombing.
- April 19 – Bertolt Brecht's anti-war play Mother Courage and Her Children (Mutter Courage und ihre Kinder) is launched at the Schauspielhaus Zürich in Switzerland, with Therese Giehse in the title rôle.
- May 5 – Kingsley Amis and Philip Larkin meet while both reading English at St John's College, Oxford.
- May 10/11 – The Blitz: 250,000 books are burned in the Library stacks of the British Museum in London as a result of incendiary bombing.
- May 21 – The 1941 theatre strike in Norway begins. Actors in the Norwegian professional theater strike in response to the revocation of work permits for six actors who refuse to perform on state radio for the Quisling regime during the occupation of Norway by Nazi Germany.
- June – Noël Coward's comedy Blithe Spirit is premièred at Manchester Opera House in England. Opening in London on July 2, its run of 1,997 consecutive performances sets a record for non-musical plays in the West End theatre, which will not be surpassed for more than twenty years. The original cast stars Kay Hammond as Elvira, Margaret Rutherford as Madame Arcati, Cecil Parker as Charles and Fay Compton as Ruth. The Broadway première takes place on November 5 at the Morosco Theatre.
- June 22 – Among those fleeing the Operation Barbarossa attack on the Soviet Union is a Moldovan Jewish poet, Alexandru Robot, declared missing, presumed dead by August.
- June 29
  - For unknown reasons, the Hungarian philosopher György Lukács is arrested by the NKVD and held at Lubyanka Building in Moscow; he will be released on August 26, possibly after a plea made by Mátyás Rákosi.
  - The Iași pogrom in Nazi-allied Romania is witnessed by the Italian war correspondent Curzio Malaparte, who recounts it in a chapter of his novel Kaputt (1944), for long the only work to deal with the events.
- August 6 – C. S. Lewis begins a series of BBC Radio broadcasts that give rise to Mere Christianity.
- August 18 – Pilot Officer John Gillespie Magee, Jr., a 19-year-old poet of American paternity serving in Britain with the Royal Canadian Air Force, makes a high-altitude test flight in a Spitfire V from RAF Llandow in Wales, and then by September 3 completes the sonnet "High Flight" about the experience. On December 11 he dies in an air collision over England.
- Fall – Ellery Queen's Mystery Magazine is launched under the editorship of Frederic Dannay, by Lawrence E. Spivak's Mercury Publications in New York City.
- September – In Nazi-allied Romania, George Călinescu publishes his companion to Romanian literature (Istoria literaturii române de la origini până în prezent). It is condemned in the far-right press for including entries on Romanian Jewish writers, whose work has been explicitly banned. It is eventually withdrawn from circulation, but its own racist undertones are criticized by intellectuals, among them both Romanian Jews (Felix Aderca and Mihail Sebastian) and non-Jews (Șerban Cioculescu, Mihai Ralea and Vladimir Streinu).
- September 6–7 – Under Nazi occupation, Yiddish poet Abraham Sutzkever is among the Polish Jews interned in the Vilna Ghetto.
- c. October – The first known reference to Babi Yar in poetry is written soon after the Babi Yar massacres, the work of the young Jewish-Ukrainian poet from Kyiv and an eyewitness, Liudmila Titova; her poem "Babi Yar" will be discovered only in the 1990s.
- October 27 – F. Scott Fitzgerald's novel The Last Tycoon, unfinished on his death in 1940, is edited by Edmund Wilson and published by Charles Scribner's Sons in New York City.
- November – Brendan Behan is released from Borstal in England and deported back to Ireland.
- December

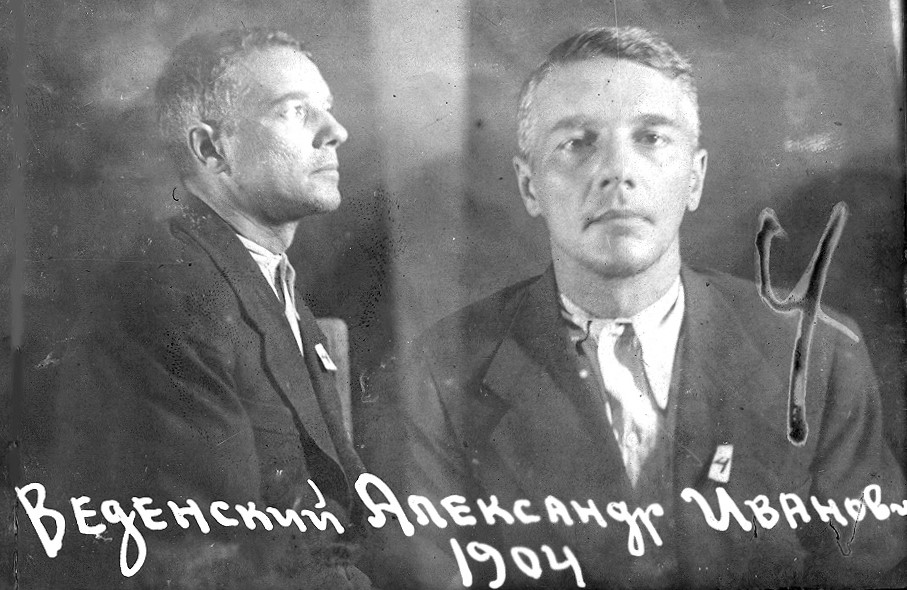
Alexander Vvedensky's mug shot in NKVD records

  - During the Siege of Leningrad, Yakov Druskin, ill and starving, and Maria Malich, second wife of Russian avant-garde poet Danil Kharms (arrested this summer for treason and imprisoned in the psychiatric ward at Leningrad Prison No. 1, where he will die in 1942), trudge to Kharms' bombed-out apartment building to collect a trunk of manuscripts, so preserving his work and that of Alexander Vvedensky's for decades until it can be circulated. Vvedensky, arrested in September in Kharkiv for "counterrevolutionary agitation", is evacuated, but dies of pleurisy on the way.
  - Penguin Books publishes in the U.K. the first story book in its Puffin Books children's paperback imprint: Worzel Gummidge by Barbara Euphan Todd. Also this year, the imprint publishes its first fictional picture book: Kathleen Hale's Orlando's Evening Out. The series editor is Eleanor Graham.
- unknown dates
  - The new National and University Library of Slovenia building in Ljubljana, designed by Jože Plečnik in 1930/1931, is completed and opened to the public.
  - Biblioteca Cantonale (Cantonal Library) at Lugano in the Italian-speaking Canton of Ticino in neutral Switzerland, designed by Rino and Carlo Tami, is completed.
  - The Bosnian Serb writer Branko Ćopić joins the Yugoslav Partisans.
  - The poet Ezra Pound applies unsuccessfully to return to the U.S. from Italy. He begins appearing on Rome Radio with antisemitic broadcasts sympathetic to the Axis powers.
  - The Classic Comics series is launched in the United States with a version of The Three Musketeers.

== New books ==
=== Fiction ===
- Margery Allingham – Traitor's Purse
- Isaac Asimov – Nightfall (novelette)
- William Attaway – Blood on the Forge
- Pierre Benoit – The Gobi Desert
- Frans G. Bengtsson – The Long Ships, part 1 (Röde Orm, originally translated as Red Orm)
- Maurice Blanchot – Thomas l'Obscur (Thomas the Obscure)
- Godfried Bomans – Erik of het klein insectenboek (Erik and His Little Insect Book)
- Jorge Luis Borges – The Garden of Forking Paths (El Jardín de senderos que se bifurcan, short stories)
- Phyllis Bottome – London Pride
- Caryl Brahms and S. J. Simon – No Bed for Bacon
- Christianna Brand
  - Death in High Heels
  - Heads You Lose
- John Buchan (died 1940) – Sick Heart River
- Pearl S. Buck – China Sky
- Gerald Butler – They Cracked Her Glass Slipper
- James M. Cain – Mildred Pierce
- Joyce Cary – Herself Surprised
- John Dickson Carr
  - The Case of the Constant Suicides
  - Death Turns the Tables
  - Seeing is Believing (as by Carter Dickson)
- Peter Cheyney
  - It Couldn't Matter Less
  - Your Deal, My Lovely
- Agatha Christie
  - Evil Under the Sun
  - N or M?
- J. Storer Clouston – Beastmark the Spy
- Colette – Julie de Carneilhan
- J.J. Connington – The Twenty-One Clues
- John Creasey – Salute the Toff
- Freeman Wills Crofts
  - James Tarrant, Adventurer
  - The Losing Game
- A. J. Cronin – The Keys of the Kingdom
- Eric Cross – The Tailor and Ansty
- Cecil Day-Lewis – The Case of the Abominable Snowman
- L. Sprague de Camp – Lest Darkness Fall (complete novel)
- August Derleth – Someone in the Dark
- Ilya Ehrenburg – The Fall of Paris («Падение Парижа», Padeniye Parizha)
- F. Scott Fitzgerald (died 1940) – The Last Tycoon
- Anthony Gilbert
  - The Vanishing Corpse
  - The Woman in Red
- Marcus Goodrich – Delilah
- Patrick Hamilton – Hangover Square
- Robert A. Heinlein – Methuselah's Children
- James Hilton – Random Harvest
- Anne Hocking – Miss Milverton
- Dorothy B. Hughes – The Bamboo Blonde
- Soeman Hs – Kawan Bergeloet (Playmate, collected short stories)
- Hammond Innes – Attack Alarm
- Michael Innes – Appleby on Ararat
- Anna Kavan – Change the Name
- C. S. Lewis – The Screwtape Letters
- Janet Lewis – The Wife of Martin Guerre
- E. C. R. Lorac – Case in the Clinic
- Marie Belloc Lowndes – Before the Storm
- Helen MacInnes – Above Suspicion
- Compton Mackenzie – The Red Tapeworm
- Hugh MacLennan – Barometer Rising
- Ngaio Marsh
  - Death and the Dancing Footman
  - Surfeit of Lampreys
- W. Somerset Maugham – Up at the Villa
- Oscar Micheaux – The Wind From Nowhere
- Betty Miller – Farewell, Leicester Square
- Henry Miller – The Colossus of Maroussi
- Gladys Mitchell
  - Hangman's Curfew
  - When Last I Died
- Edgar Mittelholzer – Corentyne Thunder
- Vilhelm Moberg – Ride This Night (Rid i natt)
- Paul Morand – The Man in a Hurry (L'Homme pressé)
- Vladimir Nabokov – The Real Life of Sebastian Knight
- Flann O'Brien – An Béal Bocht
- E. Phillips Oppenheim – The Shy Plutocrat
- Rafael Sabatini – Columbus
- Budd Schulberg – What Makes Sammy Run?
- Anya Seton – My Theodosia
- Georges Simenon – Strange Inheritance
- Armstrong Sperry – Call It Courage
- Cecil Street
  - Death at the Helm
  - They Watched by Night
- Phoebe Atwood Taylor
  - The Perennial Boarder
  - The Hollow Chest (as by Alice Tilton)
- Kylie Tennant – The Battlers
- Franz Werfel – The Song of Bernadette (Das Lied von Bernadette)
- Rex Warner – The Aerodrome
- Eudora Welty – A Curtain of Green
- Ethel Lina White – She Faded into Air
- Virginia Woolf (suicide March 28) – Between the Acts

=== Children and young people ===
- Enid Blyton
  - The Adventurous Four
  - The Twins at St. Clare's
- Walter D. Edmonds – The Matchlock Gun
- Mary Grannan – Just Mary
- Robert McCloskey – Make Way for Ducklings
- Arthur Ransome – Missee Lee
- H. A. Rey and Margret Rey – Curious George (first in the Curious George series of seven books)
- Mary Treadgold – We Couldn't Leave Dinah
- Dorothy Vicary – Lucy Brown's Schooldays etc.
- Laura Ingalls Wilder – Little Town on the Prairie

=== Drama ===
- Jean Anouilh
  - Eurydice
  - Le Rendez-vous de Senlis
- Bertolt Brecht
  - Mother Courage and Her Children
  - The Resistible Rise of Arturo Ui (written)
- Noël Coward – Blithe Spirit
- Kenneth Horne – Love in a Mist
- Molly Keane – Ducks and Drakes
- Esther McCracken – Quiet Weekend
- Pablo Picasso – Desire Caught by the Tail (Le Désir attrapé par la queue, written)
- Enrique Jardiel Poncela – We Thieves Are Honourable (Los ladrones somos gente honrada)
- Vernon Sylvaine
  - Warn That Man!
  - Women Aren't Angels
- Xavier Villaurrutia – Invitación à la muerte
- Emlyn Williams – The Morning Star
- Richard Wright and Paul Green - Native Son produced by Orson Welles at the St. James Theatre NYC, on March 24.

=== Poetry ===
- W. H. Auden – New Year Letter (British edition of 'The Double Man')
- William Rose Benét – The Dust which is God
- Laurence Binyon – The North Star and Other Poems
- T. S. Eliot – The Dry Salvages (third of the Four Quartets; in February New English Weekly)
- A Choice of Kipling's Verse by T. S. Eliot (published December)
- G. S. Fraser – The Fatal Landscape and Other Poems
- Patrick Kavanagh – The Great Hunger
- John Gillespie Magee, Jr. – "High Flight"
- John Pudney – "For Johnny"

=== Non-fiction ===
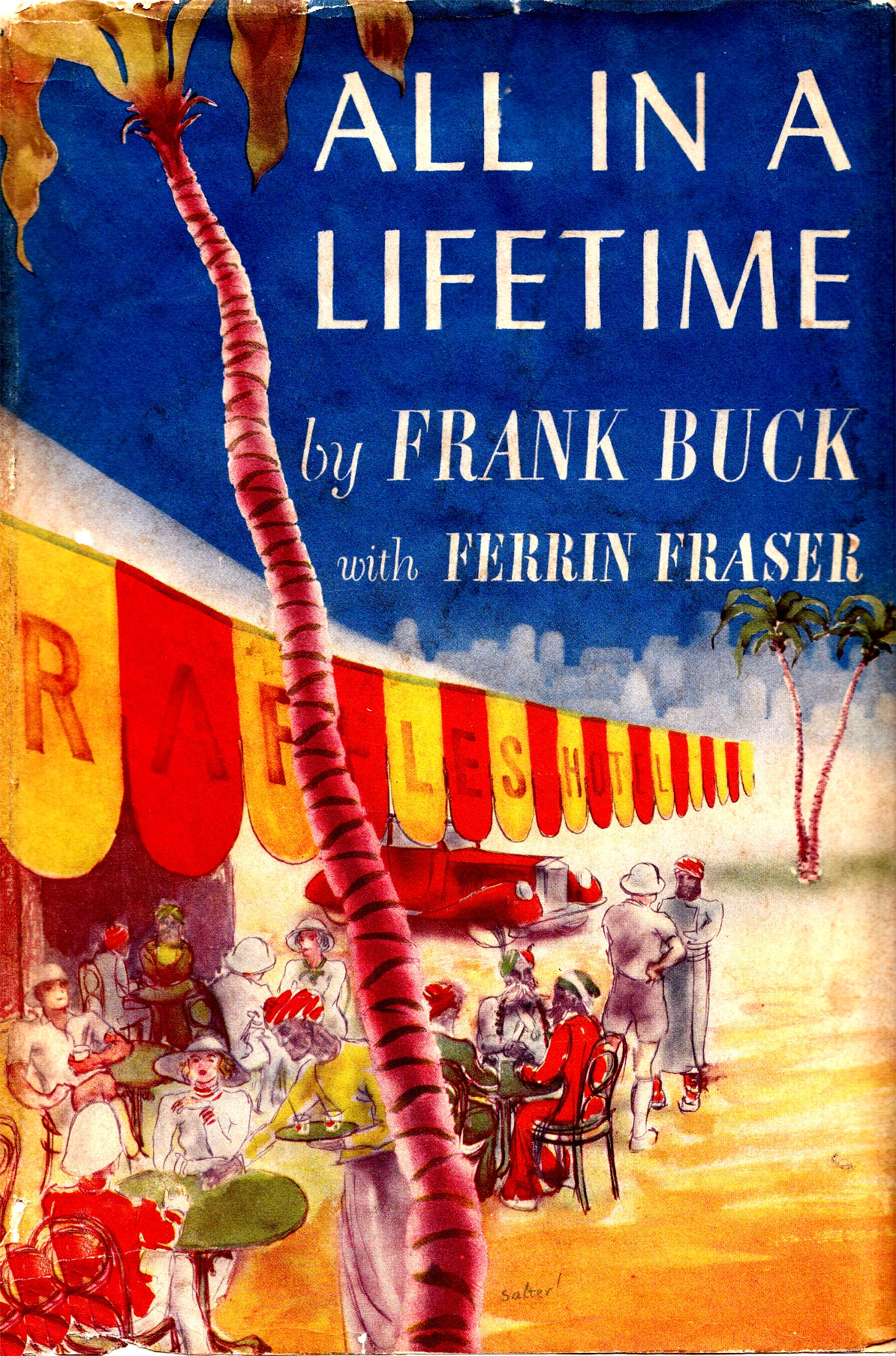
The publisher Robert M. McBride goes bankrupt in 1948 and the copyright on All In A Lifetime is never renewed.

- Aurelio Baldor – Álgebra de Baldor
- Frank Buck with Ferrin Fraser – All in a Lifetime
- George Călinescu – Istoria literaturii române de la origini până în prezent
- Joyce Cary
  - The Case for African Freedom
  - A House of Children
- Leonora Eyles – For My Enemy Daughter
- Victor Gollancz – Russia and Ourselves
- Louis MacNeice – The Poetry of W. B. Yeats
- The Oxford Dictionary of Quotations
- Michael Richey – "Sunk by a Mine. A Survivor's Story"
- Vita Sackville-West – English Country Houses
- Antal Szerb – A világirodalom története (History of World Literature)
- Robert Vansittart – Black Record. Germans Past and Present
- Rebecca West – Black Lamb and Grey Falcon: a journey through Yugoslavia
- Stefan Zweig – Brasilien. Ein Land der Zukunft (Brazil, Land of the Future)

== Births ==
- January 19 – Colin Gunton, English theologian and academic (died 2003)
- January 24 – Gary K. Wolf, American humorist
- March 13
  - Mahmoud Darwish, Palestinian poet (died 2008)
  - Donella Meadows, American environmentalist (died 2001)
- March 22 – Billy Collins, American poet
- April 10 – Paul Theroux, American novelist and travel writer
- May 13 – Miles Kington, Northern Irish-born humorist and journalist (died 2008)
- May 19 – Nora Ephron, American novelist and screenwriter (died 2012)
- May 24 – Bob Dylan, born Robert Allen Zimmerman, American singer-songwriter, recipient of the Nobel Prize in Literature
- June 5 – Spalding Gray, American screenwriter and dramatist (died 2004)
- June 27 – James P. Hogan, English-born American science fiction author (died 2010)
- July 5 – Barbara Frischmuth, Austrian writer of poetry and prose (died 2025)
- July 9 – Cirilo Bautista, Filipino poet, author and critic (died 2018)
- July 12 – John Lahr, American-born author and critic
- August 9
  - Shirlee Busbee, American novelist
  - Jamila Gavin, Anglo-Indian children's writer
- August 26 – Ayşe Kulin, Turkish writer
- September 1 – Gwendolyn MacEwen, Canadian poet (died 1987)
- September 3 – Sergei Dovlatov, Russian short-story writer and novelist (died 1990)
- September 15 – Lindsay Barrett, Jamaican novelist, poet and journalist
- October 2 – John Sinclair, American poet
- October 4 – Anne Rice, American horror/fantasy writer (died 2021)
- October 10 – Ken Saro-Wiwa, Nigerian writer (executed 1995)
- October 13 – John Snow, English cricketer and poet
- October 20 – Stewart Parker, Northern Irish poet and playwright (died 1988)
- October 25 – Anne Tyler, American novelist
- October 27 – Gerd Brantenberg, Norwegian novelist, author and feminist
- November 18 – Marta Pessarrodona, Spanish poet, literary critic, essayist, biographer
- November 23 – Derek Mahon, Irish poet (died 2020)
- December 5 – Sheridan Morley, English biographer and critic (died 2007)
- unknown dates
  - Jonathan Aaron, American poet
  - John Mole, English poet and musician
  - Pepetela, Angolan novelist
  - Jay Rubin, American scholar and translator

== Deaths ==
- January 1 – József Konkolics, Hungarian Slovene writer (born 1859)
- January 4 – Henri Bergson, French philosopher (born 1859)
- January 6
  - Franz Hessel, German writer and translator (born 1880)
  - F. R. Higgins, Irish poet and theatre director (born 1896)
- January 13 – James Joyce, Irish novelist and poet (born 1882)
- January 23 – William Arthur Dunkerley (John Oxenham), English journalist, novelist and poet (born 1852)
- February 5 – Banjo Paterson, Australian bush poet and journalist (born 1864)
- February 9 – Elizabeth von Arnim, Australian-born English novelist (born 1866)
- February 22 – G. E. Trevelyan, English novelist (born 1903; died of injuries sustained in air raid)
- February 24 – Robert Byron, English travel writer (born 1905; torpedoed)
- March 13 – Elizabeth Madox Roberts, American novelist and poet (born 1881)
- March 28 – Virginia Woolf, English novelist and writer (born 1882; suicide)
- June 1 – Sir Hugh Walpole, New Zealand-born English novelist (born 1884)
- June 15 – Evelyn Underhill, English poet, Christian mystic and pacifist (born 1875)
- June 27 – Ieremia Cecan, Bessarabian journalist and Christian polemicist (born 1867; shot)
- July 4
  - Tadeusz Boy-Żeleński, Polish writer, translator and gynecologist (born 1874)
  - Luella Dowd Smith, American educator and author (born 1847)
- August 7 – Rabindranath Tagore, Bengali polymath and writer (born 1861)
- August 31 – Marina Tsvetaeva, Soviet Russian poet (born 1892; suicide)
- September 19 – H. E. Marshall, Scottish history writer for children (born 1867)
- October 16 – Sergei Efron, Soviet Russian poet and secret police operative (born 1893; executed)
- October 17 – May Ziadeh, Lebanese-Palestinian poet, essayist and translator (born 1886)
- October 26 – Arkady Gaidar, Soviet Russian soldier and children's story writer (born 1904; killed in action)
- November 8 – Gaetano Mosca, Italian political scientist and public servant (born 1909)
- November 18 – Émile Nelligan, French Canadian poet (born 1879)
- unknown date – Anne Elliot, English novelist (born 1856)

== Awards ==
- Carnegie Medal for children's literature: Mary Treadgold, We Couldn't Leave Dinah
- Frost Medal: Robert Frost
- James Tait Black Memorial Prize:
  - For fiction: Joyce Cary, A House of Children
  - For biography: John Gore, King George V
- Newbery Medal for children's literature: Armstrong Sperry, Call It Courage
- Nobel Prize in Literature: not awarded
- Pulitzer Prize:
  - Drama: Robert E. Sherwood, There Shall Be No Night
  - Poetry: Leonard Bacon: Sunderland Capture
  - Novel: No award given
- Hugo Award:
  - Best Novella: Robert A. Heinlein, "If This Goes On—"
