= Spotted Hemlock =

1958 novel

- First edition
- Author: Gladys Mitchell
- Language: English
- Series: Mrs Bradley
- Genre: Mystery
- Publisher: Michael Joseph
- Publication date: 1958
- Publication place: United Kingdom
- Media type: Print
- Preceded by: The Twenty-Third Man
- Followed by: The Man Who Grew Tomatoes

Spotted Hemlock is a 1958 mystery detective novel by the British writer Gladys Mitchell. It is the thirty first in the long-running series of books featuring Mitchell's best known creation, the psychoanalyst and amateur detective Mrs Bradley. It has been considered one of Mitchell's best novels along with other works such as The Saltmarsh Murders, Death at the Opera and The Rising of the Moon.

== Synopsis ==
The students of Calladale, a female agricultural college have been ragged by a local men's college, and are plotting their revenge when the body of one of their students is found hidden away in a local pub. Dame Beatrice Bradley is called in by her nephew, one of the teachers at Calladale, to investigate.

== Bibliography ==
- Hanson, Gillian Mary. City and Shore: The Function of Setting in the British Mystery. McFarland, 2015.
- Magill, Frank Northen. Critical Survey of Mystery and Detective Fiction: Authors, Volume 3. Salem Press, 1988.
- Reilly, John M. Twentieth Century Crime & Mystery Writers. Springer, 2015.
