= Baldor (disambiguation) =

Baldor may refer to:

- Baldor, a J. R. R. Tolkien character
- ABB Motors & Mechanical, a manufacturer of electric motors formerly trading as Baldor Electric Company
- Aurelio Baldor, a Cuban mathematician
