= Laurels Are Poison =

1942 novel

- First edition
- Author: Gladys Mitchell
- Language: English
- Series: Mrs Bradley
- Genre: Mystery
- Publisher: Michael Joseph
- Publication date: 1942
- Publication place: United Kingdom
- Media type: Print
- Preceded by: When Last I Died
- Followed by: The Worsted Viper

Laurels Are Poison is a 1942 mystery detective novel by the British writer Gladys Mitchell. It is the fourteenth in her long-running series featuring the psychoanalyst and amateur detective Mrs Bradley. It was Mitchell's own favourite among her novels and has been considered her best by other critics. It introduced the character of Laura Menzies who became recurring assistant of Mrs Bradley in subsequent novels.

In 2000 it was adapted for an episode of the television series The Mrs Bradley Mysteries starring Diana Rigg.

== Synopsis ==
Mrs Bradley arrives at a women's teacher training college to take up a post vacated when the previous occupant disappears at the end of term dance. But soon a series of often violent practical jokes lead to suspicions that there is a fugitive lurking somewhere in the grounds of the college. Then the body of the cook is found in a local river.

== Bibliography ==
- Hanson, Gillian Mary. City and Shore: The Function of Setting in the British Mystery. McFarland, 2015.
- Klein, Kathleen Gregory. Great Women Mystery Writers: Classic to Contemporary. Greenwood Press, 1994.
- Miskimmin, Esme. 100 British Crime Writers. Springer Nature, 2020.
- Reilly, John M. Twentieth Century Crime & Mystery Writers. Springer, 2015.
- Walton, Samantha. Guilty But Insane: Mind and Law in Golden Age Detective Fiction. Oxford University Press, 2015.
