= Tom Brown's Body =

1949 novel

- First edition
- Author: Gladys Mitchell
- Language: English
- Series: Mrs Bradley
- Genre: Mystery
- Publisher: Michael Joseph
- Publication date: 1949
- Publication place: United Kingdom
- Media type: Print
- Preceded by: The Dancing Druids
- Followed by: Groaning Spinney

Tom Brown's Body is a 1949 mystery detective novel by the British writer Gladys Mitchell. It is the twenty second in her long-running series featuring the psychoanalyst and amateur detective Mrs Bradley. The title refers to both the novel Tom Brown's School Days and the song John Brown's Body. Mitchell had previously used a school setting for her earlier work Death at the Opera.

== Synopsis ==
In the countryside searching for a book by one of her ancestors on witchcraft, Mrs Bradley acquires it from a local witch. However, a murder of one of the schoolmasters at the nearby boarding school draws her interest, particularly as it appears to be linked with witchcraft.

== Bibliography ==
- Klein, Kathleen Gregory. Great Women Mystery Writers: Classic to Contemporary. Greenwood Press, 1994.
- Reilly, John M. Twentieth Century Crime & Mystery Writers. Springer, 2015.
- Walton, Samantha. Guilty But Insane: Mind and Law in Golden Age Detective Fiction. Oxford University Press, 2015.
