= Say It with Flowers =

Say It with Flowers may refer to:

- Say It with Flowers (1934 film), a British musical film
- Say It with Flowers (1952 film), a Swedish comedy film
- Say It with Flowers (novel), a 1960 novel by Gladys Mitchell
- Say It with Flowers (play), a stage play about Dorothy Squirres
