= The Crozier Pharaohs =

1984 novel

- First edition
- Author: Gladys Mitchell
- Language: English
- Series: Mrs Bradley
- Genre: Mystery
- Publisher: Michael Joseph
- Publication date: 1984
- Publication place: United Kingdom
- Media type: Print
- Preceded by: No Winding Sheet

The Crozier Pharaohs is a 1984 mystery detective novel by the British writer Gladys Mitchell. It is the sixty sixth and last in her long-running series featuring the psychoanalyst and amateur detective Mrs Bradley. The series stretched back to the debut novel Speedy Death in 1929, during which time Bradley had barely aged or changed except for acquiring a damehood. It was published posthumously following Mitchell's death the previous year.

== Synopsis ==
In the coastal village of Abbots Crozier, two wealthy but eccentric sisters breed Pharaoh Hounds, the oldest domesticated dogs in the world. When their prize dog goes missing they launch a search, which instead turns up a man's dead body.

== Bibliography ==
- Klein, Kathleen Gregory. Great Women Mystery Writers: Classic to Contemporary. Greenwood Press, 1994.
- Reilly, John M. Twentieth Century Crime & Mystery Writers. Springer, 2015.
