= Come Away, Death =

"Come Away, Death" is a song by the fool Feste from Shakespeare's Twelfth Night.

Come Away, Death may also refer to:

== Books ==
- Come Away, Death (novel), 1937 mystery novel by Gladys Mitchell

== Songs ==
There are multiple musical settings to Shakespeare's words, amongst them:

- "Come Away, Death", song by Benjamin Dale
- "Come Away, Death", song by Gerald Finzi from his cycle Let Us Garlands Bring
- "Come Away, Death", song by Jaakko Mäntyjärvi
- "Come Away, Death", song by Roger Quilter from his cycle Three Shakespeare Songs
- "Come Away, Death", song by Ralph Vaughan Williams from his cycle
- "Come Away, Death", song by Erich Wolfgang Korngold from his cycle Songs of the Clown
