= The Worsted Viper =

1943 novel

- First edition
- Author: Gladys Mitchell
- Language: English
- Series: Mrs Bradley
- Genre: Detective
- Publisher: Michael Joseph
- Publication date: 1943
- Publication place: United Kingdom
- Media type: Print
- Preceded by: Laurels Are Poison
- Followed by: Sunset Over Soho

The Worsted Viper is a 1943 detective novel by the British writer Gladys Mitchell. It is the fifteenth in her long-running series featuring the psychoanalyst and amateur detective Mrs Bradley. Bradley was one of a number of investigators active during the Golden Age of Detective Fiction. Much of the novel takes place on the Norfolk Broads.

In 2000 it was adapted for an episode of the television series The Mrs Bradley Mysteries starring Diana Rigg.

== Synopsis ==
When three of her former students on a boating holiday in Norfolk discover a body in a cottage, they call in the assistance of Mrs Bradley.

== Bibliography ==
- Klein, Kathleen Gregory. Great Women Mystery Writers: Classic to Contemporary. Greenwood Press, 1994.
- Miskimmin, Esme. 100 British Crime Writers. Springer Nature, 2020.
- Reilly, John M. Twentieth Century Crime & Mystery Writers. Springer, 2015.
