= Death and the Maiden (novel) =

1947 novel

- First edition
- Author: Gladys Mitchell
- Language: English
- Series: Mrs Bradley
- Genre: Mystery
- Publisher: Michael Joseph
- Publication date: 1947
- Publication place: United Kingdom
- Media type: Print
- Preceded by: Here Comes a Chopper
- Followed by: The Dancing Druids

Death and the Maiden is a 1947 mystery detective novel by the British writer Gladys Mitchell. It is the twentieth in her long-running series featuring the psychoanalyst and amateur detective Mrs Bradley.

== Synopsis ==
Near Winchester in Hampshire, a water nymph is reported to have been spotted in the River Itchen. Basing herself in a hotel in the historic city, Mrs Bradley investigates rumours that two boys found dead in the river had been lured to their deaths by the nymph.

== Bibliography ==
- Klein, Kathleen Gregory. Great Women Mystery Writers: Classic to Contemporary. Greenwood Press, 1994.
- Reilly, John M. Twentieth Century Crime & Mystery Writers. Springer, 2015.
