= Death of a Delft Blue =

1964 novel

- First edition
- Author: Gladys Mitchell
- Language: English
- Series: Mrs Bradley
- Genre: Mystery
- Publisher: Michael Joseph
- Publication date: 1964
- Publication place: United Kingdom
- Media type: Print
- Preceded by: Adders on the Heath
- Followed by: Pageant of Murder

Death of a Delft Blue is a 1964 mystery detective novel by the British writer Gladys Mitchell. It is the thirty-seventh in the long-running series of books featuring Mitchell's best known character, the psychoanalyst and amateur detective Mrs Bradley.

== Synopsis ==
While attending a conference in the Netherlands, Mrs Bradley encounters an eccentric Dutch family including a young woman under pressure to marry her cousin, to the outrage of her handsome brother Florian. While Florian is sitting for a portrait commissioned by his aunt in which he is holding a delft blue object, he disappears. He subsequently reappears in the British Peak District in Derbyshire. Shortly afterwards two local barmaids die after eating poisoned chocolates which may have been intended for Florian.

== Bibliography ==
- Reilly, John M. Twentieth Century Crime & Mystery Writers. Springer, 2015.
