= Pageant of Murder =

1965 novel

- First edition
- Author: Gladys Mitchell
- Language: English
- Series: Mrs Bradley
- Genre: Mystery
- Publisher: Michael Joseph
- Publication date: 1965
- Publication place: United Kingdom
- Media type: Print
- Preceded by: Death of a Delft Blue
- Followed by: The Croaking Raven

Pageant of Murder is a 1965 mystery detective novel by the British writer Gladys Mitchell. It is the thirty eighth in the long-running series of books featuring Mitchell's best-known character, the psychoanalyst and amateur detective Mrs Bradley.

== Synopsis ==
The small town of Brayne not too far from Windsor is to be granted borough status. To celebrate this an ambitious local councillor decides to stage a historical pageant. However the death of the actor playing Falstaff, killed by a knife wound, leads to the arrival of Mrs Bradley to investigate.

== Bibliography ==
- Reilly, John M. Twentieth Century Crime & Mystery Writers. Springer, 2015.
