= The Echoing Strangers =

1952 novel

- First edition
- Author: Gladys Mitchell
- Language: English
- Series: Mrs Bradley
- Genre: Mystery
- Publisher: Michael Joseph
- Publication date: 1952
- Publication place: United Kingdom
- Media type: Print
- Preceded by: The Devil's Elbow
- Followed by: Merlin's Furlong

The Echoing Strangers is a 1952 mystery detective novel by the British writer Gladys Mitchell. It is the twenty fifth entry in her long-running series featuring the psychoanalyst and amateur detective Mrs Bradley.

In a review in The Observer Maurice Richardson felt it "tails off a bit after a flying start, but you'll read away" while later in the Times Literary Supplement he concluded "Towards the end the shifting of the scene from the Norfolk Broads, where one victim is drowned, to Hampshire, where another is beaten to death with a cricket bat, becomes bewilderingly abrupt. There is, however, no lack of zest." Eric Forbes-Boyd in the Sunday Times considered it "complicated by twins whose resemblance muddled the police, and, eventually, me. Mrs. Bradley, leering and chuckling, is as mesmeric as ever, but the tale meanders, and the end is summary."

== Synopsis ==
While visiting an old school friend in Norfolk Mrs Bradley goes boating on a nearby river, where she catches sight of a young man pushing a woman into the water although she manages to survive. He proves to be Francis, one of identical twins, and the grandson of the cricket-obsessed Sir Adrian Caux. The murder of a local blackmailer follows, his body discovered pinned underneath a boat. It coincides with an invitation to young Irish-born teacher Thomas Donagh to tutor Caux's other grandson Derry at his Hampshire manor house. However what Caux really wants Donagh for is as a ringer for an upcoming bitterly-contested cricket match against a neighbouring village. The game is interrupted when the opposing captain, another blackmailer, is found battered to death with a cricket bat in the pavilion. Only shortly before Derry had left the field and suspicion points at him.

Intrigued by the two cases Mrs Bradley begins to develop a theory that the two twins, separated from each other a decade before aged seven when their parents were killed in an accident, have been routinely switching places between Hampshire and Norfolk. Even their grandfather is apparently unable to tell them apart, and she warns him that he may be in great danger. With the assistance of Scotland Yard she sets out to gather the remaining strands of evidence together, and this requires Donagh to invite Sir Adrian Caux to take part in a second cricket match.

== Bibliography ==
- Klein, Kathleen Gregory. Great Women Mystery Writers: Classic to Contemporary. Greenwood Press, 1994.
- Magill, Frank Northen . Critical Survey of Mystery and Detective Fiction: Authors, Volume 3. Salem Press, 1988.
- Reilly, John M. Twentieth Century Crime & Mystery Writers. Springer, 2015.
