= The Nodding Canaries =

1961 novel

- First edition
- Author: Gladys Mitchell
- Language: English
- Series: Mrs Bradley
- Genre: Mystery
- Publisher: Michael Joseph
- Publication date: 1961
- Publication place: United Kingdom
- Media type: Print
- Preceded by: Say It with Flowers
- Followed by: My Bones Will Keep

The Nodding Canaries is a 1961 mystery detective novel by the British writer Gladys Mitchell. It is the thirty fourth in the long-running series of books featuring Mitchell's best known character, the psychoanalyst and amateur detective Mrs Bradley. The title refers to the tradition of keeping canaries in mines to watch out for a rise in dangerous gasses.

== Synopsis ==
While accompanying two potential candidates for a teaching post through the caves at Pigmy’s Ladder, schoolmistress Alice Boorman loses contact with her charges who nearly die of suffocation from noxious fumes. A subsequent investigation by Dame Beatrice Bradley uncovers the corpse of local man Oliver Breydon-Waters hidden in a nearby alcove.

== Bibliography ==
- Reilly, John M. Twentieth Century Crime & Mystery Writers. Springer, 2015.
