= The Croaking Raven =

1966 novel

- First edition
- Author: Gladys Mitchell
- Language: English
- Series: Mrs Bradley
- Genre: Mystery
- Publisher: Michael Joseph
- Publication date: 1966
- Publication place: United Kingdom
- Media type: Print
- Preceded by: Pageant of Murder
- Followed by: Skeleton Island

The Croaking Raven is a 1966 mystery detective novel by the British writer Gladys Mitchell. It is the thirty ninth in the long-running series of books featuring Mitchell's best known creation, the psychoanalyst and amateur detective Mrs Bradley. The title is taken from a line from Shakespeare's Hamlet "the croaking raven doth bellow for revenge".

== Synopsis ==
Dame Beatrice Bradley rents a manor house in the grounds of a former Norman castle for the summer, interested in discovering more about the property which had once belonged to one of her patients. She is soon drawn in to investigating the suspicious death of the house's last owner who died two years before. On top of everything else the ruins of the castle appear to be haunted by a singing ghost.

== Bibliography ==
- Magill, Frank Northen. Critical Survey of Mystery and Detective Fiction: Authors, Volume 3. Salem Press, 1988.
- Reilly, John M. Twentieth Century Crime & Mystery Writers. Springer, 2015.
