= St Peter's Finger =

1938 novel

- First edition
- Author: Gladys Mitchell
- Language: English
- Series: Mrs Bradley
- Genre: Mystery
- Publisher: Michael Joseph
- Publication date: 1938
- Publication place: United Kingdom
- Media type: Print
- Preceded by: Come Away, Death
- Followed by: Printer's Error

St Peter's Finger is a 1938 mystery detective novel by the British writer Gladys Mitchell. It is the ninth in her long-running series featuring the psychoanalyst and amateur detective Mrs Bradley.

== Synopsis ==
Mrs Bradley is called in to investigate a suspicious death at a convent school in the coastal settlement of St Peter's Finer, so-called because of its towering church tower. One of the students has been found dead in the bath, but it becomes clear that rather than drowning she has died from carbon monoxide poisoning.

== Reception ==
Cecil Day-Lewis reviewing the novel in The Spectator under his pen name Nicholas Blake found the opening impressive, "but I found it difficult to keep all the threads of the plot in my hand, and it does peter out a little towards the end: perhaps this is because the criminal’s motive strained my credulity".

== Bibliography ==
- Klein, Kathleen Gregory. Great Women Mystery Writers: Classic to Contemporary. Greenwood Press, 1994.
- Reilly, John M. Twentieth Century Crime & Mystery Writers. Springer, 2015.
- Walton, Samantha. Guilty But Insane: Mind and Law in Golden Age Detective Fiction. Oxford University Press, 2015.
