= Groaning Spinney =

1950 novel

- First edition
- Author: Gladys Mitchell
- Language: English
- Series: Mrs Bradley
- Genre: Mystery
- Publisher: Michael Joseph
- Publication date: 1950
- Publication place: United Kingdom
- Media type: Print
- Preceded by: Tom Brown's Body
- Followed by: The Devil's Elbow

Groaning Spinney is a 1950 mystery detective novel by the British writer Gladys Mitchell. It is the twenty third in her long-running series featuring the psychoanalyst and amateur detective Mrs Bradley. It was later republished under the title of Murder in the Snow.

== Synopsis ==
While staying for Christmas with her nephew and his family at his house in Gloucestershire in the Cotswolds, Mrs Bradley is intrigued by a local legend about a murdered Victorian village parson whose ghost appears at the entrance to a copse of trees known as "Groaning Spinney". She is drawn to investigate when a corpse is found there in imitation of the death of a century earlier.

== Bibliography ==
- Klein, Kathleen Gregory. Great Women Mystery Writers: Classic to Contemporary. Greenwood Press, 1994.
- Reilly, John M. Twentieth Century Crime & Mystery Writers. Springer, 2015.
