= Faintley Speaking =

1954 novel

- First edition
- Author: Gladys Mitchell
- Language: English
- Series: Mrs Bradley
- Genre: Mystery
- Publisher: Michael Joseph
- Publication date: 1954
- Publication place: United Kingdom
- Media type: Print
- Preceded by: Merlin's Furlong
- Followed by: Watson's Choice

Faintley Speaking is a 1954 mystery detective novel by the British writer Gladys Mitchell. It is the twenty seventh in her long-running series featuring the psychoanalyst and amateur detective Mrs Bradley.

== Synopsis ==
An overhead phone conversation from a Miss Faintley draws a struggling author into a mystery involving a parcel drop that leads to murder of Faintley, a seemingly respectable schoolteacher. Mrs Bradley investigates the case, involving a gang of smugglers, through her devoted secretary Laura who goes undercover.

== Bibliography ==
- Klein, Kathleen Gregory. Great Women Mystery Writers: Classic to Contemporary. Greenwood Press, 1994.
- Reilly, John M. Twentieth Century Crime & Mystery Writers. Springer, 2015.
