= The Devil's Elbow =

1951 novel

- First edition
- Author: Gladys Mitchell
- Cover artist: Barbara Bradley
- Language: English
- Series: Mrs Bradley
- Genre: Mystery
- Publisher: Michael Joseph
- Publication date: 1951
- Publication place: United Kingdom
- Media type: Print
- Preceded by: Groaning Spinney
- Followed by: The Echoing Strangers

The Devil's Elbow is a 1951 mystery detective novel by the British writer Gladys Mitchell. It is the twenty fourth in her long-running series featuring the psychoanalyst and amateur detective Mrs Bradley. The novel takes its name from a geographical feature along the route of the trip.

== Synopsis ==
A coach trip around the Scottish Highlands appears uneventful until, near to its end, one of the passengers is murdered. On her own initiative Mrs Bradley sets out to solve the case, where there are no less than thirty one suspects.

== Bibliography ==
- Klein, Kathleen Gregory. Great Women Mystery Writers: Classic to Contemporary. Greenwood Press, 1994.
- Reilly, John M. Twentieth Century Crime & Mystery Writers. Springer, 2015.
