= The Mystery of a Butcher's Shop =

1929 novel

- First edition
- Author: Gladys Mitchell
- Language: English
- Series: Mrs Bradley
- Genre: Mystery
- Publisher: Gollancz
- Publication date: 1929
- Publication place: United Kingdom
- Media type: Print
- Preceded by: Speedy Death
- Followed by: The Longer Bodies

The Mystery of a Butcher's Shop is a 1929 mystery detective novel by the British writer Gladys Mitchell. It is the second in her long-running series featuring the psychoanalyst and amateur detective Mrs Bradley. It further established the reputation of the quick-witted Bradley who is some way ahead of the investigating police officers. Mitchell also employed a number of original touches that would continue during the series.

== Synopsis ==
In the quaint village of Bossbury, joints of human meat are founding hanging from the hooks in the cold room of the butcher's shop. Meanwhile nearby a bishop discovers a skull while going for a swim by the seaside. Everything seems to point to the dead man being Rupert Sethleigh, who has gone missing although his cousin claims he has left for America.

== Bibliography ==
- Klein, Kathleen Gregory. Great Women Mystery Writers: Classic to Contemporary. Greenwood Press, 1994.
- Miskimmin, Esme. 100 British Crime Writers. Springer Nature, 2020.
- Reilly, John M. Twentieth Century Crime & Mystery Writers. Springer, 2015.
