= My Bones Will Keep =

1962 novel

- Author: Gladys Mitchell
- Cover artist: Kenneth Farnhill
- Language: English
- Series: Mrs Bradley
- Genre: Mystery
- Publisher: Michael Joseph
- Publication date: 1962
- Publication place: United Kingdom
- Media type: Print
- Preceded by: The Nodding Canaries
- Followed by: Adders on the Heath

My Bones Will Keep is a 1962 mystery detective novel by the British writer Gladys Mitchell. It is the thirty fifth in the long-running series of books featuring Mitchell's best known character, the psychoanalyst and amateur detective Mrs Bradley.

== Synopsis ==
While accompanying her friend Dame Beatrice Bradley to a conference in Scotland, her assistant Laura becomes dragged into a mystery that intrigues her.

== Bibliography ==
- Craig, Patricia & Cadogan, Mary. The Lady Investigates: Women Detectives and Spies in Fiction. Orion Publishing Group 1981.
- Reilly, John M. Twentieth Century Crime & Mystery Writers. Springer, 2015.
