= Mrs Bradley =

Fictional detective created by Gladys Mitchell

- First appearance: Speedy Death
- Created by: Gladys Mitchell
- Portrayed by: Mary Wimbush and Margaret Yarde (BBC Radio); Diana Rigg (TV)

In-universe information
- Gender: Female
- Title(s): Mrs, later Dame
- Occupation: Psychiatrist
- Spouses: Mr Lestrange (first husband; deceased); Unnamed second husband (deceased); Mr Bradley (third husband; deceased)
- Children: Sir Ferdinand Lestrange (son); Unnamed second son by her second husband
- Relatives: Derek Lestrange (grandson); Sally Lestrange (granddaughter); Juliet Lestrange (ex-daughter-in-law); Caroline Lestrange (daughter-in-law)
- Nationality: British

Beatrice Adela Bradley is a fictional detective created by Gladys Mitchell. Mrs (later Dame Beatrice) Bradley is Mitchell's most significant and long-lived character, appearing in 66 novels that were published between 1929 and 1975.

== Life ==
Mrs Bradley is the first female character to be both a detective heroine and a member of an 'established profession'. A fully qualified medical doctor and a psychoanalyst, she is a consultant for the Home Office, and she also acts as an amateur detective.

Mrs Bradley lives in the village of Wandles Parva, located in the New Forest. Her sidekicks include her chauffeur George Cuddleup, and her secretary Laura Menzies.

== Books ==
- Speedy Death, (London: Gollancz, 1929)
- The Mystery of a Butcher's Shop, (London: Gollancz, 1929)
- The Longer Bodies, (London: Gollancz, 1930)
- The Saltmarsh Murders, (London: Gollancz, 1932)
- Death at the Opera, (London: Grayson, 1934) also known as Death in the Wet (Philadelphia: Macrae Smith Company, 1934)
- The Devil at Saxon Wall, (London: Grayson, 1935)
- Dead Men's Morris, (London: Michael Joseph, 1936)
- Come Away, Death, (London: Michael Joseph, 1937)
- St Peter's Finger, (London: Michael Joseph, 1938)
- Printer's Error, (London: Michael Joseph, 1939)
- Brazen Tongue, (London: Michael Joseph, 1940)
- Hangman's Curfew, (London: Michael Joseph, 1941)
- When Last I Died, (London: Michael Joseph, 1941)
- Laurels Are Poison, (London: Michael Joseph, 1942)
- The Worsted Viper, (London: Michael Joseph, 1943)
- Sunset Over Soho, (London: Michael Joseph, 1943)
- My Father Sleeps, (London: Michael Joseph, 1944)
- The Rising of the Moon, (London: Michael Joseph, 1945)
- Here Comes a Chopper, (London: Michael Joseph, 1946)
- Death and the Maiden, (London: Michael Joseph, 1947)
- The Dancing Druids, (London: Michael Joseph, 1948)
- Tom Brown's Body, (London: Michael Joseph, 1949)
- Groaning Spinney, (London: Michael Joseph, 1950)
- The Devil's Elbow, (London: Michael Joseph, 1951)
- The Echoing Strangers, (London: Michael Joseph, 1952)
- Merlin's Furlong, (London: Michael Joseph, 1953)
- Faintley Speaking, (London: Michael Joseph, 1954)
- Watson's Choice, (London: Michael Joseph, 1955)
- Twelve Horses and the Hangman's Noose, (London: Michael Joseph, 1956)
- The Twenty-Third Man, (London: Michael Joseph, 1957)
- Spotted Hemlock, (London: Michael Joseph, 1958)
- The Man Who Grew Tomatoes, (London: Michael Joseph, 1959)
- Say It with Flowers, (London: Michael Joseph, 1960)
- The Nodding Canaries, (London: Michael Joseph, 1961)
- My Bones Will Keep, (London: Michael Joseph, 1962)
- Adders on the Heath, (London: Michael Joseph, 1963)
- Death of a Delft Blue, (London: Michael Joseph, 1964)
- Pageant of Murder, (London: Michael Joseph, 1965)
- The Croaking Raven, (London: Michael Joseph, 1966)
- Skeleton Island, (London: Michael Joseph, 1967)
- Three Quick and Five Dead, (London: Michael Joseph, 1968)
- Dance to Your Daddy, (London: Michael Joseph, 1969)
- Gory Dew, (London: Michael Joseph, 1970)
- Lament for Leto, (London: Michael Joseph, 1971)
- A Hearse on May-Day, (London: Michael Joseph, 1972)
- The Murder of Busy Lizzie, (London: Michael Joseph, 1973)
- A Javelin for Jonah, (London: Michael Joseph, 1974)
- Winking at the Brim, (London: Michael Joseph, 1974)
- Convent on Styx, (London: Michael Joseph, 1975)
- Late, Late in the Evening, (London: Michael Joseph, 1976)
- Noonday and Night, (London: Michael Joseph, 1977)
- Fault in the Structure, (London: Michael Joseph, 1977)
- Wraiths and Changelings, (London: Michael Joseph, 1978)
- Mingled with Venom, (London: Michael Joseph, 1978)
- Nest of Vipers, (London: Michael Joseph, 1979)
- The Mudflats of the Dead, (London: Michael Joseph, 1979)
- Uncoffin'd Clay, (London: Michael Joseph, 1980)
- The Whispering Knights, (London: Michael Joseph, 1980)
- The Death-Cap Dancers, (London: Michael Joseph, 1981)
- Lovers, Make Moan, (London: Michael Joseph, 1981)
- Here Lies Gloria Mundy, (London: Michael Joseph, 1982)
- The Death of a Burrowing Mole, (London: Michael Joseph, 1982)
- The Greenstone Griffins, (London: Michael Joseph, 1983)
- Cold, Lone and Still, (London: Michael Joseph, 1983)
- No Winding-Sheet, (London: Michael Joseph, 1984)
- The Crozier Pharaohs, (London: Michael Joseph, 1984)
- Sleuth's Alchemy, Cases of Mrs. Bradley and Others (Crippen & Landru, 2005)

The last-named is a collection of all but one of Gladys Mitchell's short stories from 1938 to 1956, many previously uncollected; edited and with a comprehensive introduction by Nicholas Fuller.

== Portrayals ==
Mrs Bradley was portrayed by Diana Rigg in the television series The Mrs Bradley Mysteries, and on radio by Margaret Yarde and Mary Wimbush.
