= Watson's Choice =

1955 novel

- First edition
- Author: Gladys Mitchell
- Language: English
- Series: Mrs Bradley
- Genre: Mystery
- Publisher: Michael Joseph
- Publication date: 1955
- Publication place: United Kingdom
- Media type: Print
- Preceded by: Faintley Speaking
- Followed by: Twelve Horses and the Hangman's Noose

Watson's Choice is a 1955 mystery detective novel by the British writer Gladys Mitchell. It is the twenty-eighth in her long-running series featuring the psychoanalyst and amateur detective Mrs Bradley.

== Synopsis ==
The wealthy Sir Bohun Chantrey hosts a party to celebrate the anniversary of Sherlock Holmes, with whom he is obsessed. However his relatives are astonished when he announces he is getting married again.

== Bibliography ==
- Klein, Kathleen Gregory. Great Women Mystery Writers: Classic to Contemporary. Greenwood Press, 1994.
- Reilly, John M. Twentieth Century Crime & Mystery Writers. Springer, 2015.
