= Álgebra de Baldor =

1941 mathematics book

Book cover

Álgebra, commonly known as Álgebra de Baldor (Spanish: Baldor's Algebra), is a book by the Cuban mathematician, lawyer, and professor Aurelio Baldor. The first edition was published on 19 June 1941. Baldor's Algebra contains a total of 5,790 exercises, averaging 19 exercises per test. It is considered one of the most comprehensive works on algebra.

== Publication history ==
The first recorded edition of Baldor's Algebra was published in 1941 by Editorial Cultural in Havana, Cuba. In 1948, Aurelio Baldor sold the rights to the Mexican publisher Publicaciones Culturales in order to invest the proceeds in his educational institute. This publisher continued to publish the book from Mexico. Upon his arrival in Mexico, already in exile, the book was published by Editorial Cultural Mexicana. According to this website, the book was also published in Venezuela, Colombia, and Spain. Publications continue in Mexico, following reorganizations and name changes of the original publishing companies, by Grupo Editorial Patria.

== Description ==
The cover of early editions of Algebra was red, and until the 2005 edition the illustrations were originally created by the Cuban artist D.G. Terminel. The cover featured the Persian Muslim mathematician Al-Khwarizmi and, in the background, a depiction of his native Baghdad, which covers part of the front and back covers. The front flap is illustrated with a portrait of the Greek mathematician and physicist Archimedes, as well as the siege of his city, Syracuse. The back flap featured a portrait of the Scottish mathematician John Napier, one of the developers of logarithms.

For the 2007 edition, published by Grupo Editorial Patria, the book underwent a complete redesign, with the graphic elements updated by graphic designer Juan Bernardo Rosado Ortiz, illustrator José Luis Mendoza Monroy, and layout artist Carlos Sánchez. This edition is the first to include a CD-ROM to supplement the printed material.

== Content ==
The book consists of a preface, 39 chapters, and an appendix. The chapters, in order, are: Addition, Subtraction, Grouping Signs, Multiplication, Division, Notable Products and Quotients, The Remainder Theorem (also called the Residual Theorem), First-degree Integer Equations with One Unknown, Problems Involving First-degree Integer Equations with One Unknown, Factorial Decomposition, Greatest Common Divisor, Least Common Multiple, Algebraic Fractions—Simplifying Fractions, Operations with Algebraic Fractions, First-Degree Fractional Numerical Equations with One Unknown, First-Degree Algebraic Equations with One Unknown, Problems Involving First-Degree Fractional Equations—Movable-Point Problems, Formulas, Inequalities, Functions, Graphical representation of functions, Graphs—practical applications, Indeterminate equations, First-degree simultaneous equations with two unknowns, First-degree simultaneous equations with three or more unknowns, Problems solved using simultaneous equations, Elementary study of coordinate theory, Powers, Roots, Theory of exponents, Radicals, Imaginary numbers, Second-degree equations with one unknown, Problems solved using second-degree equations—The lamp problem, Theory of second-degree equations—Study of the quadratic trinomial, Binomial and trinomial equations, Sequences, Logarithms, Compound Interest, Amortization, and Impositions.

The appendix contains tables for calculating compound interest and decreasing compound interest, a chart of the basic forms of factorial decomposition, and a table of powers and roots. Finally, it includes the answers to the more than 1,500 exercises found in some standard textbooks.

Each chapter begins with an illustrated heading. The introductory sections are headed by a drawing alluding to prehistory and pre-Columbian civilizations, which signifies the origin of the concept of number. Chapter 1 is headed by an illustration alluding to mathematics in ancient Egypt. The brief accompanying text mentions the Rhind Papyrus. The next illustration deals with calculation in Chaldea and Assyria. Chapter 3 deals with Thales of Miletus. The following are, in order, Pythagoras, Plato, Euclid, Archimedes, Ptolemy, Diophantus and Hypatia. Then there is an illustration on algebra in India, alongside its three main figures: Aryabhata, Brahmagupta, and Bhaskara. The next one is about the three greatest figures of the so-called Baghdad School: Al-Khwarizmi, Al-Battani, and Omar Khayyam. Next is an illustration discussing mathematics in the Hispano-Arabic universities and the contributions made by its best-known figures: Juan of Spain, Johannes de Sacrobosco, and Adelard of Bath. From there, the evolution of mathematics from the Late Middle Ages to the 20th century is presented, mentioning other mathematicians such as: Leonardo de Pisa, Raimundo Lulio, Nicolo Tartaglia, Gerolamo Cardano, François Viète, John Neper, René Descartes, Pierre Fermat, Blas Pascal, Isaac Newton, Gottfried Leibnitz, Brook Taylor, Leonardo Euler, Jean D'Alembert, Joseph-Louis Lagrange, Gaspard Monge, Pierre-Simon Laplace, Carl Friedrich Gauss, Augustin Louis Cauchy, Nikolai Lobachevsky, Niels Henrik Abel, Carl Gustav Jacobi, Évariste Galois, Karl Weierstrass, Henri Poincaré, Max Planck, and lastly Albert Einstein.
