= Merlin's Furlong =

1953 novel

- First edition
- Author: Gladys Mitchell
- Language: English
- Series: Mrs Bradley
- Genre: Mystery
- Publisher: Michael Joseph
- Publication date: 1953
- Publication place: United Kingdom
- Media type: Print
- Preceded by: The Echoing Strangers
- Followed by: Faintley Speaking

Merlin's Furlong is a 1953 mystery detective novel by the British writer Gladys Mitchell. It is the twenty sixth entry in her long-running series featuring the psychoanalyst and amateur detective Mrs Bradley.

== Synopsis ==
Three seemingly unconnected deaths in and near the rural setting of Merlin's Furlong prove to be linked by a cult practicing black magic.

== Bibliography ==
- Klein, Kathleen Gregory. Great Women Mystery Writers: Classic to Contemporary. Greenwood Press, 1994.
- Magill, Frank Northen . Critical Survey of Mystery and Detective Fiction: Authors, Volume 3. Salem Press, 1988.
- Reilly, John M. Twentieth Century Crime & Mystery Writers. Springer, 2015.
