= Adders on the Heath =

1963 novel by Gladys Mitchell

- First edition
- Author: Gladys Mitchell
- Cover artist: Kenneth Farnhill
- Language: English
- Series: Mrs Bradley
- Genre: Mystery
- Publisher: Michael Joseph
- Publication date: 1963
- Publication place: United Kingdom
- Media type: Print
- Preceded by: My Bones Will Keep
- Followed by: Death of a Delft Blue

Adders on the Heath is a 1963 mystery detective novel by the British writer Gladys Mitchell. It is the thirty sixth in the long-running series of books featuring Mitchell's best known character, the psychoanalyst and amateur detective Mrs Bradley.

== Synopsis ==
The fierce rivalry between two running clubs appears to have ended in murder, until Dame Beatrice Bradley is able to demonstrate the real reason for the death.

== Bibliography ==
- Reilly, John M. Twentieth Century Crime & Mystery Writers. Springer, 2015.
