= My Father Sleeps =

1944 novel

- First edition
- Author: Gladys Mitchell
- Language: English
- Series: Mrs Bradley
- Genre: Mystery
- Publisher: Michael Joseph
- Publication date: 1944
- Publication place: United Kingdom
- Media type: Print
- Preceded by: Sunset Over Soho
- Followed by: The Rising of the Moon

My Father Sleeps is a 1944 mystery detective novel by the British writer Gladys Mitchell. It is the seventeenth in her long-running series featuring the psychoanalyst and amateur detective Mrs Bradley. It is set in the Western Highlands of Scotland.

== Synopsis ==
While on a walking holiday the brother and sister-in-law of Mrs. Bradleys's secretary Laura Menzies encounter a strange local landowner Hector Loudoun who claims he is being pressured to sell ownership of one of his lochs.

== Bibliography ==
- Klein, Kathleen Gregory. Great Women Mystery Writers: Classic to Contemporary. Greenwood Press, 1994.
- Miskimmin, Esme. 100 British Crime Writers. Springer Nature, 2020.
- Reilly, John M. Twentieth Century Crime & Mystery Writers. Springer, 2015.
