= The Devil at Saxon Wall =

1935 novel

- First edition
- Author: Gladys Mitchell
- Language: English
- Series: Mrs Bradley
- Genre: Mystery
- Publisher: Grayson
- Publication date: 1935
- Publication place: United Kingdom
- Media type: Print
- Preceded by: Death at the Opera
- Followed by: Dead Men's Morris

The Devil at Saxon Wall is a 1935 mystery detective novel by the British writer Gladys Mitchell. It is the sixth in her long-running series featuring the psychoanalyst and amateur detective Mrs Bradley. It was the first of a number of her books to feature the theme of witchcraft, the result of hearing a lecture about it from her friend Helen Simpson who she dedicated the novel to.

== Reception ==
Edward Shanks wrote a review for the Evening Standard, concluding "This is a refreshing variation on the usual thriller, but it cannot be pronounced a complete success. The jacket artist has added to the prevailing effect of nightmare by having apparently had in his mind some other book". The Observer review stated "I would not wish my dearest foe to miss The Devil at Saxon Wall; a new Gladys Mitchell is as much an event as a new Dorothy L. Sayers".

== Synopsis ==
In the wake of a nervous breakdown a novelist goes to live in the seemingly quiet Hampshire village of Saxon Wall, but is so unsettled by the strange events going on that he calls in Mrs Bradley.

== Bibliography ==
- Klein, Kathleen Gregory. Great Women Mystery Writers: Classic to Contemporary. Greenwood Press, 1994.
- Miskimmin, Esme. 100 British Crime Writers. Springer Nature, 2020.
- Reilly, John M. Twentieth Century Crime & Mystery Writers. Springer, 2015.
