= Sunset Over Soho =

1943 novel

- First edition
- Author: Gladys Mitchell
- Language: English
- Series: Mrs Bradley
- Genre: Detective
- Publisher: Michael Joseph
- Publication date: 1943
- Publication place: United Kingdom
- Media type: Print
- Preceded by: The Worsted Viper
- Followed by: My Father Sleeps

Sunset Over Soho is a 1943 detective novel by the British writer Gladys Mitchell. It is the sixteenth in her long-running series featuring the psychoanalyst and amateur detective Mrs Bradley. Bradley was one of a number of investigators active during the Golden Age of Detective Fiction.

A review by Ralph Partridge in the New Statesman noted "Miss Mitchell does her best to represent English surrealism. Sunset over Soho seems to centre round a body in a coffin, which starts its career somewhere up the Thames and eventually comes to earth in an air-raid shelter in Soho, having apparently dropped out of a church. Someone takes part in the evacuation of Dunkirk, and someone else takes a trip to the Canary Islands. No incident is ever explained, and there are plenty of incidents; while Mrs. Bradley lords it over all. This must be the deepest of Miss Mitchell’s constructions, as even her most ardent fans have been unable to fathom its beauties."

== Synopsis ==
At the height of the Second World War, a crated body is found in the basement of the London air raid shelter in which Mrs Bradley is working.

== Bibliography ==
- Klein, Kathleen Gregory. Great Women Mystery Writers: Classic to Contemporary. Greenwood Press, 1994.
- Miskimmin, Esme. 100 British Crime Writers. Springer Nature, 2020.
- Reilly, John M. Twentieth Century Crime & Mystery Writers. Springer, 2015.
