= Lament for Leto =

1971 novel

- First edition
- Author: Gladys Mitchell
- Language: English
- Series: Mrs Bradley
- Genre: Mystery
- Publisher: Michael Joseph
- Publication date: 1971
- Publication place: United Kingdom
- Media type: Print
- Preceded by: Gory Dew
- Followed by: A Hearse on May-Day

Lament for Leto is a 1971 mystery detective novel by the British writer Gladys Mitchell. It is the forty fourth in the long-running series of books featuring Mitchell's best known character, the psychoanalyst and amateur detective Mrs Bradley. It is a loose sequel to the 1937 novel Come Away, Death with several of the characters reappearing.

== Synopsis ==
While sheltering from the rain at the British Museum Dame Beatrice Bradley runs into an old archaeologist acquaintance. He invites her to accompany his new expedition to uncover the glories of Ancient Greece. However, when they embark on the journey to the Mediterranean she notices the tensions among the other members of the expedition, particularly driven by the demanding, self-involved novelist Chloe Cowie.

== Bibliography ==
- Parker, Peter & Kermode, Frank. The Reader's Companion to the Twentieth-century Novel. Fourth Estate, 1994
- Reilly, John M. Twentieth Century Crime & Mystery Writers. Springer, 2015.
