= The Dancing Druids =

1948 novel

- First edition
- Author: Gladys Mitchell
- Language: English
- Series: Mrs. Bradley
- Genre: Mystery
- Publisher: Michael Joseph
- Publication date: 1948
- Publication place: United Kingdom
- Media type: Print
- Preceded by: Death and the Maiden
- Followed by: Tom Brown's Body

The Dancing Druids is a 1948 mystery detective novel by the British writer Gladys Mitchell. It is the twenty-first in her long-running series featuring the psychoanalyst and amateur detective Mrs. Bradley. The title refers to a group of prehistoric stones whose appearance resembles dancing druids.

== Synopsis ==
In the West Country a cross country runner stumbles across a mysterious scene, and calls in Mrs. Bradley who arrives with her various assistants.

== Bibliography ==
- Craig, Patricia & Cadogan, Mary. The Lady Investigates: Women Detectives and Spies in Fiction. Orion Publishing Group 1981.
- Klein, Kathleen Gregory. Great Women Mystery Writers: Classic to Contemporary. Greenwood Press, 1994.
- Reilly, John M. Twentieth Century Crime & Mystery Writers. Springer, 2015.
