= Twelve Horses and the Hangman's Noose =

1956 novel

- First edition
- Author: Gladys Mitchell
- Language: English
- Series: Mrs Bradley
- Genre: Mystery
- Publisher: Michael Joseph
- Publication date: 1956
- Publication place: United Kingdom
- Media type: Print
- Preceded by: Watson's Choice
- Followed by: The Twenty-Third Man

Twelve Horses and the Hangman’s Noose is a 1956 mystery detective novel by the British writer Gladys Mitchell. It is the twenty-ninth in the long-running series of books featuring Mitchell's best known creation, the psychoanalyst and amateur detective Mrs Bradley.

A review in The Spectator noted that the "maddening thing about Miss Mitchell is that the more implausible her plots the more readable she is" while fellow novelist Francis Iles in The Guardian wrote "here is real detection, credible characters, and a pleasant story too: in fact everything one expects from Miss Gladys Mitchell. The only regret is that she does not give it to us more often".

== Synopsis ==
John Mapstead is found dead, apparently kicked to death by a horse at the riding stables he owns. Dame Beatrice Bradley, who lives nearby, is unconvinced by the coroner's verdict of death by misadventure and sets out to investigate.

== Bibliography ==
- Magill, Frank Northen. Critical Survey of Mystery and Detective Fiction: Authors, Volume 3. Salem Press, 1988.
- Reilly, John M. Twentieth Century Crime & Mystery Writers. Springer, 2015.
