= Gladys Mitchell =

English author (1901–1983)

- Born: Gladys Maude Winifred Mitchell; 21 April 1901; Cowley, Oxford, England
- Died: 27 July 1983 (aged 82); Corfe Mullen, Dorset, England
- Education: Rothschild School, Brentford, The Green School, Goldsmiths College
- Writing career
- Pen name: Stephen Hockaby, Malcolm Torrie
- Genre: Crime fiction
- Literary movement: Detection Club

Gladys Maude Winifred Mitchell (21 April 1901 – 27 July 1983) was an English writer best known for her creation of Mrs Bradley, the heroine of 66 detective novels, starting with Speedy Death (1929). She also wrote under the pseudonyms Stephen Hockaby and Malcolm Torrie. Fêted during her life (called "the Great Gladys" by Philip Larkin), her work has been largely neglected in the decades since her death.

== Life ==
Gladys Maude Winifred Mitchell was born in Cowley, Oxford on 19 April 1901 to James, a market gardener of Scottish parentage, and Annie. She was educated at Rothschild School, Brentford and The Green School. From 1919 to 1921 she attended Goldsmiths College and University College London.

Upon her graduation, Mitchell became a teacher of history, English and games at St Paul's School, Brentford until 1925. She then taught at St Ann's Senior Girls School, Hanwell until 1939. In 1926 she obtained an external diploma in European History from University College, and she then began to write novels while continuing to teach. In 1941 she joined Brentford School for Girls where she stayed until 1950. After a three-year break from teaching, she took a job at Matthew Arnold School, Staines, where she taught English and history, coached hurdling and wrote the annual school play until her retirement to Corfe Mullen, Dorset in 1961. She continued to write until her death aged 82 on 27 July 1983. Her estate was valued at £48 082.

She was a member of the Middlesex Education Association, the British Olympic Association, the Crime Writers' Association, PEN and the Society of Authors. Her hobbies included architecture and writing poetry. She studied the works of Sigmund Freud and her interest in witchcraft was encouraged by her friend the detective novelist Helen Simpson. Mitchell never married.

== Work ==
Mitchell wrote at least one novel a year throughout her career. Her first novel (Speedy Death, 1929) introduced Beatrice Adela Lestrange Bradley, a polymathic psychoanalyst and author who was featured in a further 65 novels. Her strong views and those of her assistant, Laura Menzies, on social and philosophical issues reflected those of her author; they appear to have been something of a self-portrait of the young Mitchell, reflecting, for good or ill, the standards of the modern, post-war era of the 1920s.

Mitchell was an early member of the Detection Club along with G. K. Chesterton, Agatha Christie and Dorothy L. Sayers and throughout the 1930s was considered to be one of the "Big Three women detective writers", but she often challenged and mocked the conventions of the genre – notably in her earliest books, such as the first novel Speedy Death, where there is a particularly surprising twist to the plot, or her parodies of Christie in The Mystery of a Butcher's Shop (1929) and The Saltmarsh Murders (1932). Her plots and settings were unconventional with Freudian psychology, witchcraft (notably in The Devil at Saxon Wall [1935] and The Worsted Viper [1943]) and the supernatural (naiads and Nessie, ghosts and Greek gods) as recurrent themes.

In addition to her 66 Mrs. Bradley novels Mitchell also used the pseudonyms of Stephen Hockaby (for a series of historical novels) and Malcolm Torrie (for a series of detective stories featuring an architect named Timothy Herring) and wrote ten children's books under her own name.

After her death Mitchell's work was neglected although three posthumously published novels sold well in the 1980s. Radio adaptations were made (by Elizabeth Proud) of Speedy Death (6 October 1990) and The Mystery of a Butcher's Shop (11 & 18 December 1991) both with Mary Wimbush as Mrs Bradley and broadcast on BBC Radio 4; both adaptations were very faithful to the original books. A BBC television series, The Mrs Bradley Mysteries (starring Diana Rigg) was produced in 1999; however, the characteristic cackle and crocodilian looks were absent, and the plots and characters were changed. Several of her books were published in large print editions in the mid 1980s.

By the mid 1990s, only one of her novels was in regular print: a Virago Press paperback edition of The Rising of the Moon (1945) – which is still in print. Something of a renaissance began in 2005 with the publication of a collection of hitherto unpublished short stories, Sleuth's Alchemy, by Crippen & Landru. In the same year Minnow Press published a new edition of her rare 1940 novel Brazen Tongue. Also, Rue Morgue Press published new editions of Death at the Opera (1934) and When Last I Died (1941) – this publisher now has a total of nine Mrs Bradley books in print. Minnow Press continued their Mrs Bradley Collectors' Series with the reissue of the scarce 1939 title Printer's Error in 2007, The Worsted Viper in 2009, and Hangman's Curfew in 2010. Of the four Minnow Press titles, only the last two are still in print. More recently, Random House has published nine titles in paperback and as ebooks under their Vintage imprint, Greyladies has published Convent on the Styx (1976) in paperback, and Groaning Spinney (1950) was republished as Murder in the Snow: a Cotswold Christmas Mystery.

Although critical opinion is divided on what is her best work, her strengths and style can be gleaned from the following 16 books: The Saltmarsh Murders (1932), Death at the Opera (1934), The Devil at Saxon Wall (1935), Come Away, Death (1937), Brazen Tongue (1940), When Last I Died (1941), The Rising of the Moon (1945), Death and the Maiden (1947), The Dancing Druids (1948), Tom Brown's Body (1949), Groaning Spinney (1950), The Echoing Strangers (1952), Merlin's Furlong (1953), Dance to Your Daddy (1969), Nest of Vipers (1979), and The Greenstone Griffins (1983). The Gladys Mitchell Tribute Site has reviews of almost all the books in its Bibliography section.

== Bibliography ==
=== as Gladys Mitchell ===
==== Novels ====
- Speedy Death, (London: Gollancz, 1929)
- The Mystery of a Butcher's Shop, (London: Gollancz, 1929)
- The Longer Bodies, (London: Gollancz, 1930)
- The Saltmarsh Murders, (London: Gollancz, 1932)
- Death at the Opera, (London: Grayson, 1934)
- The Devil at Saxon Wall, (London: Grayson, 1935)
- Dead Men's Morris, (London: Michael Joseph, 1936)
- Come Away, Death, (London: Michael Joseph, 1937)
- St Peter's Finger, (London: Michael Joseph, 1938)
- Printer's Error, (London: Michael Joseph, 1939)
- Brazen Tongue, (London: Michael Joseph, 1940)
- Hangman's Curfew, (London: Michael Joseph, 1941)
- When Last I Died, (London: Michael Joseph, 1941)
- Laurels Are Poison, (London: Michael Joseph, 1942)
- The Worsted Viper, (London: Michael Joseph, 1943)
- Sunset Over Soho, (London: Michael Joseph, 1943)
- My Father Sleeps, (London: Michael Joseph, 1944)
- The Rising of the Moon, (London: Michael Joseph, 1945)
- Here Comes a Chopper, (London: Michael Joseph, 1946)
- Death and the Maiden, (London: Michael Joseph, 1947)
- The Dancing Druids, (London: Michael Joseph, 1948)
- Tom Brown's Body, (London: Michael Joseph, 1949)
- Groaning Spinney, (London: Michael Joseph, 1950)
- The Devil's Elbow, (London: Michael Joseph, 1951)
- The Echoing Strangers, (London: Michael Joseph, 1952)
- Merlin's Furlong, (London: Michael Joseph, 1953)
- Faintley Speaking, (London: Michael Joseph, 1954)
- Watson's Choice, (London: Michael Joseph, 1955)
- Twelve Horses and the Hangman's Noose, (London: Michael Joseph, 1956)
- The Twenty-Third Man, (London: Michael Joseph, 1957)
- Spotted Hemlock, (London: Michael Joseph, 1958)
- The Man Who Grew Tomatoes, (London: Michael Joseph, 1959)
- Say It with Flowers, (London: Michael Joseph, 1960)
- The Nodding Canaries, (London: Michael Joseph, 1961)
- My Bones Will Keep, (London: Michael Joseph, 1962)
- Adders on the Heath, (London: Michael Joseph, 1963)
- Death of a Delft Blue, (London: Michael Joseph, 1964)
- Pageant of Murder, (London: Michael Joseph, 1965)
- The Croaking Raven, (London: Michael Joseph, 1966)
- Skeleton Island, (London: Michael Joseph, 1967)
- Three Quick and Five Dead, (London: Michael Joseph, 1968)
- Dance to Your Daddy, (London: Michael Joseph, 1969)
- Gory Dew, (London: Michael Joseph, 1970)
- Lament for Leto, (London: Michael Joseph, 1971)
- A Hearse on May-Day, (London: Michael Joseph, 1972)
- The Murder of Busy Lizzie, (London: Michael Joseph, 1973)
- A Javelin for Jonah, (London: Michael Joseph, 1974)
- Winking at the Brim, (London: Michael Joseph, 1974)
- Convent on Styx, (London: Michael Joseph, 1975)
- Late, Late in the Evening, (London: Michael Joseph, 1976)
- Noonday and Night, (London: Michael Joseph, 1977)
- Fault in the Structure, (London: Michael Joseph, 1977)
- Wraiths and Changelings, (London: Michael Joseph, 1978)
- Mingled with Venom, (London: Michael Joseph, 1978)
- Nest of Vipers, (London: Michael Joseph, 1979)
- The Mudflats of the Dead, (London: Michael Joseph, 1979)
- Uncoffin'd Clay, (London: Michael Joseph, 1980)
- The Whispering Knights, (London: Michael Joseph, 1980)
- The Death-Cap Dancers, (London: Michael Joseph, 1981)
- Lovers, Make Moan, (London: Michael Joseph, 1981)
- Here Lies Gloria Mundy, (London: Michael Joseph, 1982)
- Death of a Burrowing Mole, (London: Michael Joseph, 1982)
- The Greenstone Griffins, (London: Michael Joseph, 1983)
- Cold, Lone and Still, (London: Michael Joseph, 1983)
- No Winding-Sheet, (London: Michael Joseph, 1984)
- The Crozier Pharaohs, (London: Michael Joseph, 1984)

==== Short Story Collection ====
- Sleuth's Alchemy, Cases of Mrs. Bradley and Others (Crippen & Landru, 2005). A collection of all but one of Gladys Mitchell's short stories from 1938 to 1956, many previously uncollected; edited and with a comprehensive introduction by Nicholas Fuller: "The Case of the hundred cats", "Daisy Bell", "Strangers' Hall", "A Light on murder", "Rushy Glen", "Juniper gammon", "Manor Park", "A Jar of ginger", "The Knife", "The Practical joke", "Our pageant", "The Tree", "Sammy", "Peach jam", "The Plumb-line", "The Haunted house", "Falling petals", "The Price of lead", "The Spell", "The Bit of garden", "The Swimming gala", "The Tooth-pick", "The Bodkin", "The Boxer", "The Visitor", "The Oversight", "The Manuscript", "The Fish-pond", "The Alibi", "The vacuum cleaner", "Arsenic in the house"

=== as Malcolm Torrie ===
Mystery novels:

- Heavy as Lead, (London: Michael Joseph, 1966)
- Late and Cold, (London: Michael Joseph, 1967)
- Your Secret Friend, (London: Michael Joseph, 1968)
- Churchyard Salad, (London: Michael Joseph, 1969)
- Shades of Darkness, (London: Michael Joseph, 1970)
- Bismarck Herrings, (London: Michael Joseph, 1971)

=== as Stephen Hockaby ===
Historical adventure novels:

- Marsh Hay, (London: Michael Joseph, 1933)
- Seven Stars and Orion, (London: Michael Joseph, 1934)
- Gabriel's Hold, (London: Michael Joseph, 1935)
- Shallow Brown, (London: Michael Joseph, 1936)
- Grand Master, (London: Michael Joseph, 1939)
