= Speedy Death =

1929 novel

- 1932 US edition (Mason Publishing Co.)
- Author: Gladys Mitchell
- Language: English
- Series: Mrs Bradley
- Genre: Mystery
- Publisher: Gollancz (UK); Dial Press (US)
- Publication date: 1929
- Publication place: United Kingdom
- Media type: Print
- Followed by: The Mystery of a Butcher's Shop

Speedy Death is a 1929 mystery detective novel by the British writer Gladys Mitchell. It introduced the character of Mrs Bradley who would go on to appear in a further sixty five novels. The title is sometimes written as A Speedy Death.

It was loosely adapted for an episode of the 1998 television series The Mrs Bradley Mysteries.

== Synopsis ==
Psychoanalyst and amateur detective Mrs Bradley investigates the case of a famous explorer who has died while taking a bath at a country house gathering.

== Bibliography ==
- Ebury, Katherine. Modern Literature and the Death Penalty, 1890-1950. Springer Nature, 2020.
- Reilly, John M. Twentieth Century Crime & Mystery Writers. Springer, 2015.
