= Here Comes a Chopper =

1946 novel

- First edition
- Author: Gladys Mitchell
- Language: English
- Series: Mrs Bradley
- Genre: Mystery
- Publisher: Michael Joseph
- Publication date: 1946
- Publication place: United Kingdom
- Media type: Print
- Preceded by: The Rising of the Moon
- Followed by: Death and the Maiden

Here Comes a Chopper is a 1946 mystery detective novel by the British writer Gladys Mitchell. It is the nineteenth in her long-running series featuring the psychoanalyst and amateur detective Mrs Bradley. The title references a line in the nursery rhyme Oranges and Lemons. The plot revolves around a traditional country house mystery involving a man who goes missing only to turn up as a headless corpse.

In a review in the New Statesman, Ralph Partridge observed "Miss Gladys Mitchell’s style of surrealist detection is too fundamentally established to be criticised. In a misguided way she has a touch of genius."

== Bibliography ==
- Klein, Kathleen Gregory. Great Women Mystery Writers: Classic to Contemporary. Greenwood Press, 1994.
- Reilly, John M. Twentieth Century Crime & Mystery Writers. Springer, 2015.
