= The Longer Bodies =

1930 novel

- First edition
- Author: Gladys Mitchell
- Language: English
- Series: Mrs Bradley
- Genre: Mystery
- Publisher: Gollancz
- Publication date: 1930
- Publication place: United Kingdom
- Media type: Print
- Preceded by: The Mystery of a Butcher's Shop
- Followed by: The Saltmarsh Murders

The Longer Bodies is a 1930 mystery detective novel by the British writer Gladys Mitchell. It is the third in her long-running series featuring the psychoanalyst and amateur detective Mrs Bradley.

== Synopsis ==
In order to see which her relatives deserves to inherit her considerable fortune, an old lady stages a mini-Olympics in which they compete in various events. When the body of a local villager is found on the training grounds the police arrive, followed by the very persistent Mrs Bradley.

== Bibliography ==
- Klein, Kathleen Gregory. Great Women Mystery Writers: Classic to Contemporary. Greenwood Press, 1994.
- Miskimmin, Esme. 100 British Crime Writers. Springer Nature, 2020.
- Reilly, John M. Twentieth Century Crime & Mystery Writers. Springer, 2015.
