= Printer's Error =

1939 novel

- First edition
- Author: Gladys Mitchell
- Language: English
- Series: Mrs Bradley
- Genre: Mystery
- Publisher: Michael Joseph
- Publication date: 1939
- Publication place: United Kingdom
- Media type: Print
- Preceded by: St Peter's Finger
- Followed by: Brazen Tongue

Printer's Error is a 1939 mystery detective novel by the British writer Gladys Mitchell. It is the tenth in her long-running series featuring the psychoanalyst and amateur detective Mrs Bradley.

== Synopsis ==
A small publishers agrees to print an anti-Semitic work by a well-known but controversial author Fortinbras Carn. Before long he is receiving anonymous letters threatening him and then his wife is discovered bludgeoned to death. The author himself goes missing and severed body parts begin turning up across the area. As Mrs Bradley joins the investigation it appears the case make be connected to activities by agents of the German Nazi Party.

== Bibliography ==
- Klein, Kathleen Gregory. Great Women Mystery Writers: Classic to Contemporary. Greenwood Press, 1994.
- Miskimmin, Esme. 100 British Crime Writers. Springer Nature, 2020.
- Reilly, John M. Twentieth Century Crime & Mystery Writers. Springer, 2015.
