= The Rising of the Moon (novel) =

1945 novel

- First edition
- Author: Gladys Mitchell
- Cover artist: A. E. Barlow
- Language: English
- Series: Mrs Bradley
- Genre: Mystery
- Publisher: Michael Joseph
- Publication date: 1945
- Publication place: United Kingdom
- Media type: Print
- Preceded by: My Father Sleeps
- Followed by: Here Comes a Chopper

The Rising of the Moon is a 1945 mystery detective novel by the British writer Gladys Mitchell. It is the eighteenth in her long-running series featuring the psychoanalyst and amateur detective Mrs Bradley. It has been described as one of the best of Mitchell's novels.

In 2000 it was adapted for an episode of the television series The Mrs Bradley Mysteries starring Diana Rigg.

== Synopsis ==
The arrival of a travelling circus enlivens the life of a sleepy English village, particularly when one of the female tightrope walkers is found dead. The killing of a second victim, a barmaid, again when the moon is shining brightly suggests that there may be a lunatic at large.

== Bibliography ==
- Hanson, Gillian Mary. City and Shore: The Function of Setting in the British Mystery. McFarland, 2015.
- Klein, Kathleen Gregory. Great Women Mystery Writers: Classic to Contemporary. Greenwood Press, 1994.
- Reilly, John M. Twentieth Century Crime & Mystery Writers. Springer, 2015.
