= The Twenty-Third Man =

1957 novel

- First edition
- Author: Gladys Mitchell
- Cover artist: Kenneth Farnhill
- Language: English
- Series: Mrs Bradley
- Genre: Mystery
- Publisher: Michael Joseph
- Publication date: 1957
- Publication place: United Kingdom
- Media type: Print
- Preceded by: Twelve Horses and the Hangman's Noose
- Followed by: Spotted Hemlock

The Twenty-Third Man is a 1957 mystery detective novel by the British writer Gladys Mitchell. It is the thirtieth in the long-running series of books featuring Mitchell's best known creation, the psychoanalyst and amateur detective Mrs Bradley.

== Synopsis ==
Dame Beatrice Bradley is on holiday in the Canary Islands, staying on a smaller island famous for his cave where the bodies of twenty three mummified ancient kings are buried. However Karl Emden, one of the tourists, on the island appears as a twenty fourth corpse in the cave. Dame Beatrice begins to investigate the passengers who arrived with her, suspecting one of them is the killer.

== Bibliography ==
- Magill, Frank Northen. Critical Survey of Mystery and Detective Fiction: Authors, Volume 3. Salem Press, 1988.
- Reilly, John M. Twentieth Century Crime & Mystery Writers. Springer, 2015.
