= The Man Who Grew Tomatoes =

1959 novel

- First edition
- Author: Gladys Mitchell
- Language: English
- Series: Mrs Bradley
- Genre: Mystery
- Publisher: Michael Joseph
- Publication date: 1959
- Publication place: United Kingdom
- Media type: Print
- Preceded by: Spotted Hemlock
- Followed by: Say It with Flowers

The Man Who Grew Tomatoes is a 1959 mystery detective novel by the British writer Gladys Mitchell. It is the thirty second in the long-running series of books featuring Mitchell's best known creation, the psychoanalyst and amateur detective Mrs Bradley.

== Synopsis ==
When Hugh Camber inherits a Norfolk country estate following the death of his relative Paul Camber, he finds hostility and suspicion from the staff and a rival claimant. He calls in Dame Beatrice Bradley to investigate, and she is particularly intrigued by Paul's death in Scottish river while fishing for salmon and the tomatoes that he ate as his last meal.

== Bibliography ==
- Magill, Frank Northen . Critical Survey of Mystery and Detective Fiction: Authors, Volume 3. Salem Press, 1988.
- Reilly, John M. Twentieth Century Crime & Mystery Writers. Springer, 2015.
