= Dead Men's Morris =

1936 novel

- First edition
- Author: Gladys Mitchell
- Language: English
- Series: Mrs Bradley
- Genre: Mystery
- Publisher: Michael Joseph
- Publication date: 1936
- Publication place: United Kingdom
- Media type: Print
- Preceded by: The Devil at Saxon Wall
- Followed by: Come Away, Death

Dead Men's Morris is a 1936 mystery detective novel by the British writer Gladys Mitchell. It is the seventh in her long-running series featuring the psychoanalyst and amateur detective Mrs Bradley. It was the first to be published by Michael Joseph who released all the subsequent fifty nine novels in the series. It was later republished with the alternative title Death Comes at Christmas.

== Synopsis ==
Mrs Bradley goes to spend Christmas at her nephew's Oxfordshire pig farm, she investigates two apparently accidental deaths in the picturesque villages that are in fact murders. Also encountered are a legendary local ghost and a team of morris dancers.

== Bibliography ==
- Klein, Kathleen Gregory. Great Women Mystery Writers: Classic to Contemporary. Greenwood Press, 1994.
- Miskimmin, Esme. 100 British Crime Writers. Springer Nature, 2020.
- Reilly, John M. Twentieth Century Crime & Mystery Writers. Springer, 2015.
