= Brazen Tongue =

1940 novel

- First edition
- Author: Gladys Mitchell
- Cover artist: C W B
- Language: English
- Series: Mrs Bradley
- Genre: Mystery
- Publisher: Michael Joseph
- Publication date: 1940
- Publication place: United Kingdom
- Media type: Print
- Preceded by: Printer's Error
- Followed by: Hangman's Curfew

Brazen Tongue is a 1940 mystery detective novel by the British writer Gladys Mitchell. It is the eleventh in her long-running series featuring the psychoanalyst and amateur detective Mrs Bradley.

== Synopsis ==
During the early months of the Second World War in the small village of Willington, three bodies are discovered in a very short space of time leading to the investigation of Mrs Bradley.

== Bibliography ==
- Klein, Kathleen Gregory. Great Women Mystery Writers: Classic to Contemporary. Greenwood Press, 1994.
- Reilly, John M. Twentieth Century Crime & Mystery Writers. Springer, 2015.
