= When Last I Died =

1941 novel

- First US edition
- Author: Gladys Mitchell
- Language: English
- Series: Mrs Bradley
- Genre: Mystery
- Publisher: Michael Joseph (UK); Alfred A. Knopf (US)
- Publication date: 1941
- Publication place: United Kingdom
- Media type: Print
- Preceded by: Hangman's Curfew
- Followed by: Laurels Are Poison

When Last I Died is a 1941 mystery detective novel by the British writer Gladys Mitchell. It is the thirteenth in her long-running series featuring the psychoanalyst and amateur detective Mrs Bradley.

== Synopsis ==
After renting a house by the seaside Mrs Bradley comes across the diary of a former tenant in the house Bella Foxley, once accused of murdering her cousin some years before. Convinced that Bella was unfairly accused, Mrs Bradley takes it upon herself to investigate a supposedly haunted house where the murder has taken place.

== Reception ==
In a review in The Observer, Maurice Richardson described it as "perhaps Miss Mitchell’s best, most ingenious crime story yet."

== Bibliography ==
- Klein, Kathleen Gregory. Great Women Mystery Writers: Classic to Contemporary. Greenwood Press, 1994.
- Miskimmin, Esme. 100 British Crime Writers. Springer Nature, 2020.
- Reilly, John M. Twentieth Century Crime & Mystery Writers. Springer, 2015.
