= We Couldn't Leave Dinah =

1941 book by Mary Treadgold

- First edition
- Author: Mary Treadgold
- Illustrator: Stuart Tresilian (first ed.)
- Language: English
- Genre: Children's war novel, pony book
- Publisher: Jonathan Cape
- Publication date: 1941
- Publication place: United Kingdom
- Media type: Print (hardcover)
- Pages: 272 pp (first edition)
- OCLC: 41974333
- LC Class: PZ7.T6893 Le; PZ7.T6893 We2
- Followed by: The Polly Harris

We Couldn't Leave Dinah is a children's novel by Mary Treadgold, first published by Jonathan Cape in 1941 with illustrations by Stuart Tresilian. It is a contemporary adventure story set on a fictional island in the English Channel during World War II and eventually during a German occupation. Treadgold won the 1941 Carnegie Medal recognising the year's outstanding children's book.

In the US, it was published within the calendar year as Left Till Called For, with illustrations by Richard Floethe (Doubleday, Doran, 1941). Penguin issued a Puffin Books edition under the original title in 1964, with illustrations including colour plates by Elisabeth Grant. A 1946 French edition used the original Tresilian illustrations.

== Plot summary ==
The novel is set during the summer holidays early in the Second World War. The Templetons are English residents on the fictional island of Clerinel in the English Channel. The children are all members of the local Pony Club. Caroline rides the spirited Dinah, Mick the more placid Punch, and their little brother the chubby Bellman.

Meanwhile, there are rumours that the Germans who have occupied the nearby Channel Islands may be planning to take over Clerinel too. The location and topography of the island are ideally suited as a platform for launching an invasion of the South Coast. Mr. Templeton discusses leaving with the children, prompting Caroline's horrified response: "We couldn't leave Dinah".

The Pony Club's chairman, Peter Beaumarchais, has surprisingly opted for a fancy-dress carnival as their Anniversary Day celebration in mid-September. Caroline decides to go as Elaine the Lily Maid of Astolat; Mick chooses to dress simply as a local fisherboy and borrows some clothes from Petit-Jean. During the celebration Caroline spots some unfamiliar riders in fancy dress. These riders turn out to be a party of German invaders taking advantage of the fancy dress to gain easy access to the Martello tower.

The English residents hurriedly evacuate, but in the confusion Caroline and Mick are left behind. Their home having been requisitioned by the German general, they camp in some caves that have been fitted out as stables. With the help of Peter they manage to survive and stay hidden while planning their escape.

After Mick stumbles across a hidden message and decodes it, they realise there are spies on the English side working on the island. Believing he can help discover some useful information, Mick volunteers to coach Nannerl, the German general's granddaughter, in riding. Nannerl joins the Pony Club, and when Caroline leaves the island she feels Dinah is safe with the German girl until they can return.

== Characters ==
The English

- Caroline Templeton, thirteen-year-old girl
- Mick Templeton, her fourteen-year-old brother
- Thomas Templeton, their seven-year-old brother
- Mr. Templeton, their father (their mother is at this time stranded in Africa by the war)
- Alison & Nicholas Lindsay, Pam Lawrence, Rosemary Ellis, Richard Penfold and others, Pony Club members
- Mr. and Mrs. Lawrence, Pam's parents
- Commander Seymour, naval officer

The French islanders

- Peter Beaumarchais, president of the Pony Club
- Monsieur Beaumarchais, his father
- Petit-Jean, the Templetons' stable-boy
- Meurice & Pierre le Mesurier, fishermen
- Jacques Dupuy, their cousin

The Germans

- General Schleicher, leader of the occupation force
- Nannerl Schleicher, his eight-year-old granddaughter
- Karl Muller, Nannerl's "Cousin Karl", a.k.a. "Blue Feather" who led the fancy dress riders
- Friedel & Heidi, the Schleichers' maids

== Sequel ==
Caroline and Mick Templeton appear again in The Polly Harris (1949), without ponies. Sent to summer school to improve their grades, they dread being cooped up in London, but they soon find Prettyman's Hard, a little community hidden away on the edge of the river in a very old part of the city, which is anything but dull. Mick and Caroline are thrilled when their new friends the Gotchkisses plan a trip to Australia on the Polly Harris. They also uncover a case of fraud.

== Origins ==
Although itself far more than a conventional pony book, We Couldn't Leave Dinah had its origin in Mary Treadgold's dismay at the many "quite frightful" examples of horse and pony books she saw as children's editor at Heinemann. "This was September 1940 and not being a knitter or caring for the sound of falling bombs, I occupied myself relatively painlessly in the air-raid shelter with trying to implement my own verdict, 'I could do better myself!'" It was her first book, and won the Carnegie Medal. The award has been called "premature", as the book does not contain her best writing, and she may have benefited from poor competition during the war, but the novel remained in print for over four decades.

== Allusions to other works ==
Having read Tennyson's Idylls of the King, Caroline chooses to go to the fancy-dress as the romantic heroine Elaine. Later Caroline compares their gloomy attitude unfavorably to the adventurous spirits of two sets of children in popular books of the time, the Arthur Ransome children (of the Swallows and Amazons series of books) and M. E. Atkinson's Lockett family (from August Adventure, Mystery Manor etc.): "each child brooded upon those fascinating, incredible spirits of the nursery bookshelf, each the irresistible magnet of adventure".

Awards
Preceded by Visitors from London	Carnegie Medal recipient 1941	Succeeded by The Little Grey Men
