= Death at the Opera =

1934 novel

- First edition
- Author: Gladys Mitchell
- Language: English
- Series: Mrs Bradley
- Genre: Mystery
- Publisher: Grayson
- Publication date: 1934
- Publication place: United Kingdom
- Media type: Print
- Preceded by: The Saltmarsh Murders
- Followed by: The Devil at Saxon Wall

Death at the Opera is a 1934 mystery detective novel by the British writer Gladys Mitchell. It was the fifth novel in her series featuring the psychoanalyst and amateur detective Mrs Bradley. It was published in the United States under the alternative title of Death in the Wet.

In 2000 it was adapted for an episode of the television series The Mrs Bradley Mysteries starring Diana Rigg.

It was favorably reviewed by the Mysteries Ahoy blog.

== Synopsis ==
An English boarding school stages a production of The Mikado. When one of the teachers, given a starring role in the production, is found dead on the opening night Mrs Bradley is called in to investigate.

== Bibliography ==
- Miskimmin, Esme. 100 British Crime Writers. Springer Nature, 2020.
- Reilly, John M. Twentieth Century Crime & Mystery Writers. Springer, 2015.
- Stewart, Victoria. Crime Writing in Interwar Britain: Fact and Fiction in the Golden Age. Cambridge University Press, 2017.
