= Before the Storm (Lowndes novel) =

1941 novel

- Author: Marie Belloc Lowndes
- Language: English
- Genre: Mystery thriller
- Publisher: Longman (US)
- Publication date: 1941
- Publication place: United Kingdom
- Media type: Print

Before the Storm is a 1941 mystery thriller novel by the British author Marie Belloc Lowndes. Known for her crime works, particularly The Lodger, this was one of her last novels and takes place in the months before the outbreak of the Second World War.

== Bibliography ==
- Klein, Kathleen Gregory. Great Women Mystery Writers: Classic to Contemporary. Greenwood Press, 1994.
- Vinson, James. Twentieth-Century Romance and Gothic Writers. Macmillan, 1982.
