= Say It with Flowers (novel) =

1960 novel by Gladys Mitchell

- First edition
- Author: Gladys Mitchell
- Cover artist: Kenneth Farnhill
- Language: English
- Series: Mrs Bradley
- Genre: Mystery
- Publisher: Michael Joseph
- Publication date: 1960
- Publication place: United Kingdom
- Media type: Print
- Preceded by: The Man Who Grew Tomatoes
- Followed by: The Nodding Canaries

Say It with Flowers is a 1960 mystery detective novel by the British writer Gladys Mitchell. It is the thirty third in the long-running series of books featuring Mitchell's best known character, the psychoanalyst and amateur detective Mrs Bradley.

== Synopsis ==
Two Bohemians set out to find Roman era remains in the British countryside. When the amateur archaeologists unearth a skeleton they proudly display it as evidence of their theories. However, Mrs Bradley is unconvinced and the tests she has made reveal the skeleton is much more recent, likely a murder victim of the past decade.

== Bibliography ==
- Reilly, John M. Twentieth Century Crime & Mystery Writers. Springer, 2015.
