= Shirlee Busbee =

American novelist

Shirlee Elaine Busbee
- Born: August 9, 1941 (age 85); San Jose, California, U.S.
- Occupation: Novelist
- Spouse: Howard Busbee
- Writing career
- Language: English
- Period: 1977–present
- Genre: Romance
- Website: shirlee-busbee.com

Shirlee Busbee (born August 9, 1941) is an American writer of romance novels since 1977. With over nine million copies of her books in print, she is the recipient of numerous awards for excellence in writing, including the Romantic Times Reviewers' Choice Award and Affaire de Coeur's Silver and Bronze Pen Awards.

== Biography ==
Shirlee Elaine was born in San Jose, California, the first daughter of a career naval officer. She grew up with two sisters and three brothers traveling the world. She attended high school in Kenitra, Morocco and when she returned to California, went to Burbank Business College in Santa Rosa, where she met her future husband Howard Busbee, she received a certificate in 1962. On June 22, 1963, she married Howard.

Later, she worked as a draftsman in Solano County, where she met her friend and mentor, the author Rosemary Rogers. She lives in Northern California, where they raise American Shetland Ponies and own Miniature Schnauzers.

== Bibliography ==
=== Single novels ===
- This Spanish Rose, 1986/Jul
- Love a Dark Rider, 1994/Jul
- Lovers Forever, 1996/May
- A Heart for the Taking, 1997/Sep
- Love Be Mine, 1998/Nov
- For Love Alone, 2000/May
- At Long Last, 2000/Dec
- Swear by the Moon, 2001/Dec

=== Louisiana series ===
1. Gypsy Lady, 1977/Dec
2. Lady Vixen, 1980/Mar
3. While Passion Sleeps, 1983/Mar
4. Deceive Not My Heart, 1984/Jun
5. The Tiger Lily, 1985/Jul
6. Midnight Masquerade, 1988/Aug
7. Whisper to Me of Love, 1991/Apr
8. Each Time We Love, 1993/May

=== Ballinger Family series ===
1. Return to Oak Valley, 2002/Dec
2. Coming Home, 2003/Sep

=== Becomes Her series ===
1. Scandal Becomes Her, 2007/Jul
2. Seduction Becomes Her, 2008/Jul
3. Surrender Becomes Her, 2009/Jul
4. Passion Becomes Her, 2010/Jul
5. Rapture Becomes Her, 2011/Jul
6. Desire Becomes Her, 2012/Jul
