= Mary Treadgold =

British writer (1910–2005)

- Born: 16 April 1910; Muswell Hill, Greater London, England, UK
- Died: 14 May 2005 (aged 95); Kensington, London, England
- Occupations: Novelist, literary editor, BBC producer
- Writing career
- Period: 1941–1982
- Genres: Children's novels, pony books
- Notable work: We Couldn't Leave Dinah
- Notable awards: Carnegie Medal; 1941

Mary Treadgold (16 April 1910 – 14 May 2005) was an English author of books for children and adults, a literary editor and a BBC producer. She won the Carnegie Medal for British children's books in 1941.

== Life and writing ==
Treadgold was born on 16 April 1910 at 51 Woodberry Crescent, Muswell Hill, north London. Her father John was a stockbroker and a Member of the London Stock Exchange, and the family was comfortably off. Treadgold attended Ginner-Mawer School of Dance and Drama (1916–22), Challoner's School (1921–1923), and St Paul's Girls' School, London (1923–1928), before going on to Bedford College, London from 1930 to 1936, where she graduated with an MA in English literature.

After leaving university, Treadgold entered publishing, working first for Raphael Tuck & Sons and later at Heinemann's as their first children's editor. In her position Treadgold frequently read stories about ponies and pony clubs. She was generally dismayed by their quality and decided to resign in order to write her own pony story. She began We Couldn't Leave Dinah while confined to an air raid shelter during the Battle of Britain between September and December 1940. At the end of 1940 she moved to work at the BBC as a literary editor and producer in various sections of the General Overseas Service, sharing an office with Eric Blair (George Orwell) and forming a strong friendship with Una Marson, the Jamaican writer, editor and feminist. Of the twenty years she spent at the BBC, eleven were as literary editor of Books to Read, before she eventually left to concentrate on her writing.

We Couldn't Leave Dinah is the story of the Templeton children and their friends who live on a fictional island in the English Channel and who are faced with leaving their ponies behind during their evacuation and the island's subsequent German occupation. It drew on Treadgold's childhood experiences of the Channel Islands. The book was published by Jonathan Cape in 1941 and Treadgold won the annual Carnegie Medal from the Library Association, recognising the year's best children's book by a British subject. It was published in America in 1942 as Left Till Called For. It is now out of print.

No Ponies (1946) is set in post-war France, while The Polly Harris (1948) is the sequel to We Couldn't Leave Dinah and is set in post-war London, where the Templeton children become involved in terrorist bombings and smuggling.

The Winter Princess (1962) concerns the visit of a young African princess to a grace and favour apartment at Hampton Court where she meets four English children. Marcus Crouch described it as "perhaps the most delightful book by a most talented writer" and as making "an effective contribution to the race question because there is no mention of it."

Treadgold wrote a trilogy based on a house called The Heron: The Heron Ride, Return to the Heron and Journey from the Heron. The first two volumes were written in the early 1960s, the last in the series was completed in 1981.

Treadgold lived in London for most of her life. She died of cancer on 14 May 2005 at St Teresa's Nursing Home in Kensington, aged 95. She never married.

== Selected works ==
- We Couldn't Leave Dinah (1941), illustrated by Elisabeth Grant
- No Ponies (1946)
- The Polly Harris (1949); in the US also as The Mystery of the Polly Harris
- The Running Child (1951)
- "The Telephone", The Third Ghost Book, ed. Lady Cynthia Asquith (James Barrie, 1955)
- The Winter Princess (1962)
- The Heron Ride (1962)
- Return to the Heron (1963)
- The Weather Boy (1964)
- Maid's Ribbons (1965)
- Elegant Patty (1967)
- The Humbugs (1968)
- Poor Patty (1968)
- This Summer, Last Summer (1968)
- The Rum Day of the Vanishing Pony (1970)
- Journey from the Heron (1981)
