= Hangman's Curfew =

1941 novel

- First edition
- Author: Gladys Mitchell
- Language: English
- Series: Mrs Bradley
- Genre: Mystery
- Publisher: Michael Joseph
- Publication date: 1941
- Publication place: United Kingdom
- Media type: Print
- Preceded by: Brazen Tongue
- Followed by: When Last I Died

Hangman's Curfew is a 1941 mystery detective novel by the British writer Gladys Mitchell. It is the twelfth in her long-running series featuring the psychoanalyst and amateur detective Mrs Bradley.

== Synopsis ==
While in Northumberland on a walking holiday a friend of Mrs Bradley encounters a young man who claims that his uncle is being poisoned. She calls in the renowned psychoanalyst who begins making investigations, but is disconcerted to find that the uncle is in apparent good health.

== Bibliography ==
- Klein, Kathleen Gregory. Great Women Mystery Writers: Classic to Contemporary. Greenwood Press, 1994.
- Miskimmin, Esme. 100 British Crime Writers. Springer Nature, 2020.
- Reilly, John M. Twentieth Century Crime & Mystery Writers. Springer, 2015.
