= Come Away, Death (novel) =

1937 novel

- 1939 edition
- Author: Gladys Mitchell
- Language: English
- Series: Mrs Bradley
- Genre: Mystery
- Publisher: Michael Joseph
- Publication date: 1937
- Publication place: United Kingdom
- Media type: Print
- Preceded by: Dead Men's Morris
- Followed by: St Peter's Finger

Come Away, Death is a 1937 mystery detective novel by the British writer Gladys Mitchell. It is the eighth in her long-running series featuring the psychoanalyst and amateur detective Mrs Bradley. Although the plot revolves around Greek Mythology, the title is taken from a line from Shakespeare's Twelfth Night. It was followed by a loose sequel Lament for Leto in 1971.

== Synopsis ==
Keen to rediscover the secret of the Eleusinian Mysteries, archaeologist Sir Rudri Hopkinson plans to recreate the traditional rituals in Greece and summon the ancient gods. A series of strange incidents mar the expedition, ultimately ending in murder.

== Bibliography ==
- Evans, Curtis. Masters of the "Humdrum" Mystery: Cecil John Charles Street, Freeman Wills Crofts, Alfred Walter Stewart and the British Detective Novel, 1920-1961. McFarland, 2014.
- Klein, Kathleen Gregory. Great Women Mystery Writers: Classic to Contemporary. Greenwood Press, 1994.
- Miskimmin, Esme. 100 British Crime Writers. Springer Nature, 2020.
- Reilly, John M. Twentieth Century Crime & Mystery Writers. Springer, 2015.
