= The Saltmarsh Murders =

1932 novel

- First edition
- Author: Gladys Mitchell
- Language: English
- Series: Mrs Bradley
- Genre: Mystery
- Publisher: Gollancz
- Publication date: 1932
- Publication place: United Kingdom
- Media type: Print
- Preceded by: The Longer Bodies
- Followed by: Death at the Opera

The Saltmarsh Murders is a 1932 mystery detective novel by the British writer Gladys Mitchell. It is the fourth in her long-running series featuring the psychoanalyst and amateur detective Mrs Bradley. It has been highly acclaimed as a part of the Golden Age of Detective Fiction.

== Synopsis ==
In the village of Saltmarsh the Vicar's maid is strangled not long after giving birth to an illegitimate child. Mrs Bradley, staying in the nearby manor house, leads the investigation. The killing opens the lid on a Pandora's box of vice in the small settlement.

== Bibliography ==
- Miskimmin, Esme. 100 British Crime Writers. Springer Nature, 2020.
- Reilly, John M. Twentieth Century Crime & Mystery Writers. Springer, 2015.
