= Brentford School for Girls =

Location
- 5 Boston Manor Road; Brentford, Greater London, TW8 0PG; England
- Coordinates: 51.4853°N 0.3064°W

Information
- Type: Academy
- Established: 1834; 192 years ago
- Local authority: Hounslow London Borough Council
- Trust: Brentford School for Girls
- Department for Education URN: 139095 Tables
- Ofsted: Reports
- Head teacher: Marais Leenders
- Gender: Girls
- Age range: 11–18
- Enrolment: 883 (2024)
- Capacity: 949
- Website: www.brentford.hounslow.sch.uk

Brentford School for Girls is a secondary school and sixth form with academy status for girls aged 11–18, in Brentford, Greater London, England.

== History ==
The school was established as the Brentford British School in 1834, and was initially mixed.

Lionel de Rothschild and Charlotte von Rothschild took an interest in the school after taking residence at nearby Gunnersbury Park in 1835. Baroness Charlotte commenced a series of charitable donations and schemes, that culminated with her financing of a new school building in 1857. The Baroness' contributions continued until her death in 1884, and by 1906 the school had been renamed the Rothschild School.

The Rothschild School building closed in 1930, to be replaced by a new building on the school's current site. Numbers at this new school grew to such an extent that in 1968, boys were moved to Isleworth and Syon School, and the Brentford school thereafter became for girls.

In 2012, the school converted to academy status. In its three Ofsted inspections since 2011 the school has been assessed as "Good". Marias Leenders is the current Headteacher.
