= Aurelio Baldor =

Cuban mathematician, educator and lawyer (1906–1978)

Aurelio Ángel Baldor de la Vega (October 22, 1906, Havana, Cuba – April 2, 1978, Miami) was a Cuban mathematician, educator and lawyer. Baldor is the author of a secondary school algebra textbook, titled Álgebra, used throughout the Spanish-speaking world and published for the first time in 1941. He is also the author of the following two books, a) Baldor's Arithmetic and b) Baldor's Geometry of the Plane and the Space and Trigonometry.

He was the youngest child of Daniel Baldor and Gertrudis de la Vega. He was the founder and director of the Baldor School in the exclusive Vedado section of Havana. In its heyday, the school had 3,500 students and used 23 buses to provide transportation to its students. In 1959, with the arrival of Fidel Castro's communist regime, Aurelio Baldor and his family began experiencing some problems. Raúl Castro had intended to arrest Baldor, but Camilo Cienfuegos—one of Fidel Castro's own top commanders—prevented the arrest, as he highly admired and respected Baldor for his accomplishments as an educator.

After the death of Camilo Cienfuegos approximately one month later in an airplane which disappeared over the sea, Baldor and his family left Cuba and were exiled in Mexico for a short time, and then they migrated to New Orleans, Louisiana. Afterward, they moved on to New York (Brooklyn) and New Jersey, where Baldor continued teaching at Saint Peter's College in Jersey City. He also taught daily classes in mathematics at the now defunct Stevens Academy, in Hoboken, New Jersey.

He spent much time writing mathematical theorems and exercises. Once a tall and imposing man weighing 100 kg (220 lbs), Baldor slowly began losing weight as his health declined. He died from pulmonary emphysema in Miami, FL, on April 2, 1978. His seven children, grandchildren and great-grandchildren still reside in Miami. Other family include Francisco Baldor, Maria Cristina Baldor and Aurelio Baldor's second cousin Teresita Baldor.

Baldor's algebra textbook Álgebra (With Graphics and 6,523 exercises and answers) published by Compañía Cultural Editora y Distribuidora de Textos Americanos, S. A. continues being used to this day in secondary schools throughout Latin America.
