= The Mrs Bradley Mysteries =

British television crime drama series (1998–2000)

- Genre: Period crime drama
- Created by: Gladys Mitchell (character)
- Directed by: James Hawes and Martin Hutchings
- Starring: Diana Rigg; Neil Dudgeon
- Theme music composer: Ray Henderson and Matthew Scott
- Opening theme: "You're the Cream in My Coffee"
- Country of origin: United Kingdom
- Original language: English
- No. of series: 1
- No. of episodes: 5

Production
- Executive producer: Mal Young
- Producer: Deborah Jones
- Running time: 60 mins 90 mins (special)

Original release
- Network: BBC One
- Release: 31 August 1998 – 6 February 2000

The Mrs Bradley Mysteries is a British drama series starring Diana Rigg as Adela Bradley, and Neil Dudgeon as her chauffeur George Moody. The series was produced by the BBC for its BBC One channel between 31 August 1998 and 6 February 2000, based on the character created by detective writer Gladys Mitchell. Five episodes were produced, including a pilot special. Styles from the 1920s are featured, including a Rolls-Royce limousine and art deco fashions and jewellery worn by the titular character.

== Episodes ==
=== Pilot: Speedy Death ===
After making a shocking appearance at her ex-husband's funeral, Mrs. Adela Bradley, accompanied by her loyal chauffeur George, visits an old friend whose daughter has just become engaged. When the groom-to-be turns up dead, Mrs. Bradley must navigate her goddaughter's tragic past to learn the truth.

==== Supporting cast ====
John Alderton as Alastair Bing; Emma Fielding as Eleanor Bing, aka 'Mouse'; Tristan Gemmill as Garde Bing; Lynda Baron as Mrs. MacNamara; Tom Butcher as Bertie Philipson; Eleanor Tremain as Dorothy Manners; Sue Devaney as Mabel Jones; Simeon Andrews as Family Doctor; Tyler Butterworth as Ferdinand Bradley; Emma Davies as Hermione Bradley; John Conroy as Henry Baxter; Andrew Hallett as Constable; Roger Grainger as Funeral Vicar; Alec Linstead as Wedding Vicar; Carmela Marner as Pamela Storbin.

(First broadcast on BBC1 Monday, August 31, 1998)

=== Episode 1: Death at the Opera ===
Mrs. Bradley pays a visit to her alma mater, an upmarket finishing school she appears to have a low opinion of. Whilst there, she befriends some of the more promising students, only for one of the teachers to turn up dead. With George's assistance, she learns more of the teachers' quirks and the dark secrets hidden by some of the students. The pair also meet Inspector Christmas, a charming and astute policeman who's a huge fan of Adela's.

==== Supporting cast ====
Peter Davison as Inspector Christmas; Roy Barraclough as Dr Simms; David Tennant as Max Valentine; James Hurn as Alfie; Amy Marston as Agnes Delamere; Annabelle Apsion as Mona Bunting; Elaine Claxton as Miss Ferris; Susan Wooldridge as Mrs Simms; Monique DeVilliers as Clementine; Carli Norris as Plum Fisher; Ken Oxtoby as Mr Jenner

(First broadcast on BBC1 Sunday, January 16, 2000)

=== Episode 2: The Rising of the Moon ===
At the request of Inspector Christmas, Mrs. Bradley investigates the murders of two members in a traveling circus troupe: a member of the knife-throwing act and the bullwhip artist.

==== Supporting cast ====
Peter Davison as Inspector Christmas; Meera Syal as Madame Marlene; Kenneth Colley as Archie; Francis Magee as Castries; Sheila Steafel as Celestine; Peter Gallagher as Little Bernard; Nikki McInnes as Lilly; Big Mick as Tom; Felicity Montagu as Ruby Larkin; Richard Baglow as Peter; James Baglow as Francis; Nick Woodeson as John Forrester; Janine Duvitski as Mrs. Cockerton.

(First broadcast on BBC1 Sunday, January 23, 2000)

=== Episode 3: Laurels Are Poison ===
Mrs. Bradley visits her oldest friend, who is unprepared for Adela's colorful behavior. When the cook is murdered, the household begins to unravel, and Mrs. Bradley must put her detective and literary skills to work again.

==== Supporting cast ====
Phyllida Law as Isabel; Joanna Roth as Lacey; Ronan Vibert as Douglas; Michele Dotrice as Amy Parkin; Valerie Gogan as Jessie; Michael Fox as Ronnie; Kenneth MacDonald as Alf; Stuart Bunce as Seth.

(First broadcast on BBC1 Sunday, January 30, 2000)

=== Episode 4: The Worsted Viper ===
Mrs. Bradley and George make a trip to Cornwall to surprise Inspector Christmas, who's being honored for his recent work. When a local girl turns up murdered, Adela is horrified to see connections to an old case of hers. When the killer targets someone close to George, it's a race against time to unravel the secrets of the worsted viper.

==== Supporting cast ====
Peter Davison as Inspector Christmas; Pooky Quesnel as Delilah Hicks; Isla Blair as Myrtle Quincey; Rebecca Callard as Cecily Moody; Jason O'Mara as Jake Hicks; Matthew Burgess as Constable Sharp; Charlotte Francis as Temperance Baines; John Bowe as Reverend Baines; Alex Palmer as Lester Hicks; Katy Lown as Polly; Eddie Marsan as Ronald Quincey.

(First broadcast on BBC1 Sunday, February 6, 2000)

== Broadcast ==
The series was shown in the United States by PBS broadcaster WGBH as part of its Mystery! anthology strand, and introduced by Diana Rigg. The full series was also aired in Australia in 2011 by the Seven Network's station 7Two.
